= José María Pino Suárez =

7th Vice President of Mexico from 1911 to 1913

His Excellency José Maria Pino Suárez
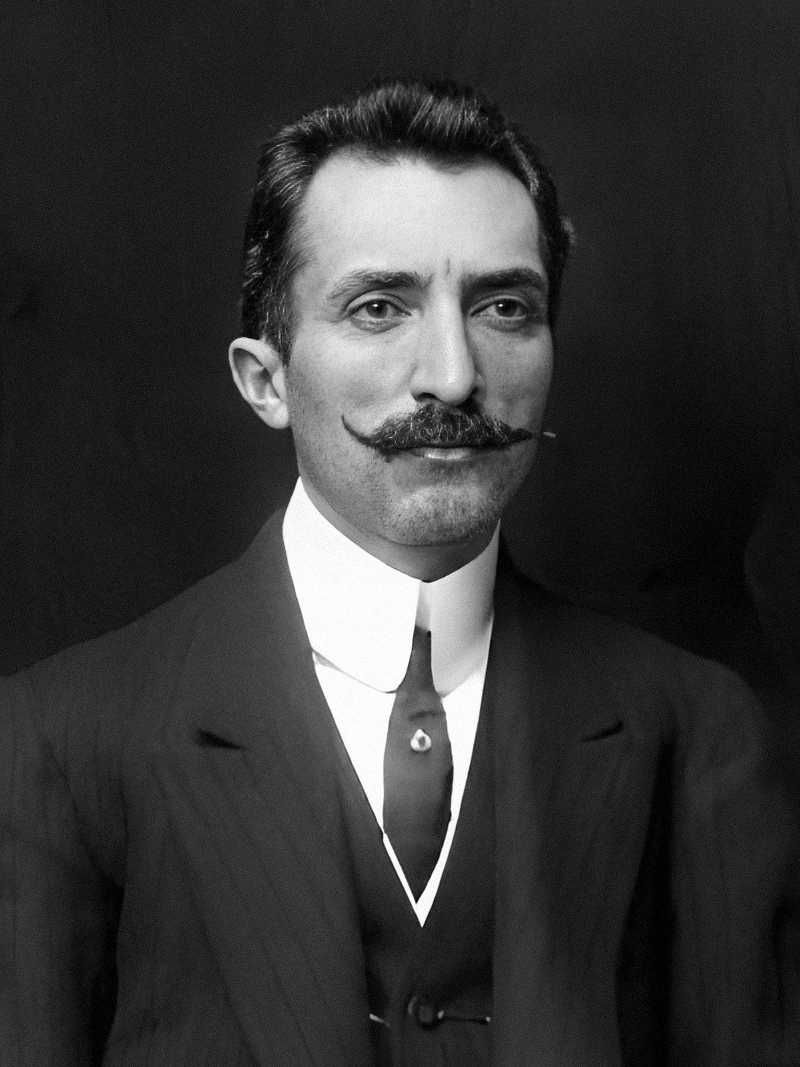
- Pino Suárez around 1911

7th Vice President of Mexico
- In office 6 November 1911 – 19 February 1913
- President: Francisco Madero
- Preceded by: Ramón Corral (Note: Corral had been Vice President under President Porfirio Díaz. When Díaz and Corral resigned, Francisco León de la Barra served as interim president for several months while Madero and Pino Suárez planned to run in the election that year. León de la Barra had no vice president, and the position remained vacant from May 25 to November 6, when Pino Suárez was sworn in as Corral's successor.)
- Succeeded by: office abolished (Note: Madero's immediate successor Pedro Lascuráin served as president for around 45 minutes and did not have time to fill the office of Vice President, and likely would not have as interim presidents usually did not. The next two presidents, Victoriano Huerta and Francisco S. Carvajal, also lacked vice presidents. Following Carvajal's resignation, the Contention of Aguascalientes appointed three men to the presidency, with none having vice presidents, and the last, Francisco Lagos Cházaro, resigning in 1915. Simultaneously, Venustiano Carranza, in competition with the forces behind the convention, was serving as Mexico's de facto head of state as First Chief of the Constitutional Army. From 1915 to 1917 there was technically no constitutional president, and thus, no vice president. In 1917 Carranza passed a new Constitution, which lacked provisions for the office of vice president, and won the presidential elections that year with no running mate. This constitution is still Mexico's law of the land, and although some interest has been generated in reestablishing the office of vice president, this has yet to occur. As such, Pino Suárez is the final Vice President of Mexico, unless the office is reinstated.)

Secretary of Education
- In office 26 February 1912 – 19 February 1913
- President: Francisco Madero
- Preceded by: Miguel Diaz Lombardo
- Succeeded by: Jorge Vera Estañol

President of the Senate
- In office 6 November 1911 – 26 February 1912
- President: Francisco Madero

Governor of Yucatán
- In office 8 October 1911 – 11 November 1911
- Preceded by: Jesus L Gonzalez
- Succeeded by: Nicolás Camára Vales

Governor of Yucatán (Interim)
- In office 6 June 1911 – 8 August 1911
- Preceded by: Luis del Carmen Curiel
- Succeeded by: Jesus L González

Secretary of Justice (Provisional)
- In office 5 October 1910 – 25 May 1911
- President: Francisco Madero; Provisional

Personal details
- Born: 8 September 1869 Tenosique, Tabasco, Mexico
- Died: 22 February 1913 (aged 43) Mexico City, Mexico
- Cause of death: Assassination (gunshot wounds)
- Resting place: Panteón de Dolores, Miguel Hidalgo borough, Mexico City
- Party: Progressive Constitutionalist Party
- Spouse: María Cámara Vales
- Children: 6
- Parent(s): José María Pino Salvatiel (father); Josefa Suárez Abreu (mother)
- Relatives: Pino Cámara Family; Pedro Sáinz de Baranda y Borreiro (great-grandfather); Joaquín Baranda (great-uncle); Ismael Moreno Pino (grandson)
- Education: Colegio de San Ildefonso; Instituto Literario de Yucatán
- Profession: Lawyer newspaper proprietor politician poet
- Awards: Belisario Domínguez Medal of Honor of the Mexican Senate

José María Pino Suárez (Spanish pronunciation: [xosemaˈɾia ˌpinoˈswaɾes]; 8 September 1869 – 22 February 1913) was a Mexican lawyer, statesman, politician, and journalist who served as the 7th and last Vice President of Mexico from 1911 until his assassination during the Ten Tragic Days coup in 1913. A close ally of President Francisco I. Madero and a prominent figure of the Mexican Revolution, he is considered a national hero for championing democratic reforms and advocating social justice. Between 1910 and 1913, he also served as President of the Senate, Secretary of Education, Governor of Yucatán, and Secretary of Justice in Madero's provisional government. He was the great-grandson of Pedro Sáinz de Baranda y Borreyro, the naval commander who founded the Mexican Navy and expelled the last Spanish forces from national territory during the Mexican War of Independence.

Born in Tenosique, Tabasco, into a distinguished political family from Yucatán, he was educated by the Jesuits in Mérida before earning his law degree in 1894. Later, he established a law firm in Mexico City in partnership with Joaquín Casasús and became involved in various businesses alongside his father-in-law, Raymundo Cámara.

In 1904, he founded El Peninsular, a newspaper that gave voice to a new generation of liberal intellectuals opposed to Olegario Molina, a powerful Porfirian cacique. El Peninsular quickly gained readers and advertisers, standing out for its use of modern printing technology, coverage of national and international news, and its editorial team that included prominent Yucatecan intellectuals. Pino Suárez authored a series of investigative journalism articles that exposed the exploitation of Maya and Yaqui indigenous people, who had been illegally reduced to conditions of slavery on some henequen haciendas. This provoked the anger of certain sectors of the Yucatecan oligarchy, known as the divine caste, who used their political and economic power to threaten the existence of the newspaper. The defense of freedom of expression against government censorship led Pino Suárez to enter the political arena.

As a supporter of Francisco I. Madero, he shared in Madero's struggle to democratize the country. As Madero's popularity grew, Porfirio Díaz, the dictator, decided to imprison him on charges of sedition. After escaping from prison, Madero issued the Plan de San Luis, which declared the 1910 federal elections fraudulent and demanded various political and social reforms, including the establishment of democratic institutions, prohibition of presidential reelection, agrarian reform, and an eight-hour workday, among others. This plan became a reference point for opponents of the Porfirian dictatorship and led to the Mexican Revolution. Pino Suárez organized the revolutionary cause in the southeastern region of Mexico and, threatened with imprisonment and forced into exile, joined Madero in San Antonio, Texas. There, Madero established a provisional government and appointed Pino Suárez as Secretary of Justice. After a significant military victory for the revolutionary cause, Pino Suárez was one of four peace commissioners tasked with negotiating the Treaty of Ciudad Juárez (1911), marking the end of the Porfirian dictatorship after three decades in power.

After the triumph of the Revolution, Pino Suárez was appointed interim Governor of Yucatán by the State Congress, but his appointment was met with violent protests by followers of Delio Moreno Cantón, a populist politician with close ties to the old regime who had strong support among the working classes. In a closely contested election, Pino Suárez managed to gain the support of the majority of the regional economic elite and was elected to his own term as governor by a narrow margin. Shortly thereafter, he requested a leave of absence from his position to assume the Vice Presidency, and the State Congress appointed Nicolás Cámara Vales, his brother-in-law, as his successor in the governorship.

The presidential elections of 1911 were characterized as peaceful, clean, and democratic, marking an important milestone in the country's history. In those elections, Francisco I. Madero was elected president and José María Pino Suárez as vice president, forming what is considered Mexico's first democratically elected government. In February 1912, Pino Suárez assumed a prominent role as Secretary of Education, and his main objective was to carry out a comprehensive educational reform. Aware of the low literacy rate in the country, he focused his efforts on making public education accessible beyond the elite, advocating for popular education. Additionally, he sought to promote an ideological transition in education, shifting from positivism to humanism. He faced opposition from los Científicos, the group that controlled the National School of Jurisprudence and resisted the educational reforms of the Madero government. This situation led to the founding of the Escuela Libre de Derecho, which was established in open opposition to Pino Suárez. Despite this, Pino Suárez authorized this institution to operate autonomously from the government.

Within the government, Pino Suárez led the renewal bloc, a liberal faction of the Maderist movement that advocated for public policies oriented towards social liberalism and the progressive reforms promised in the Plan de San Luis. Despite having a parliamentary majority, they faced a well-organized opposition that included former Porfirians. Despite the challenges, politicians from the renewal bloc played a significant role in the drafting of the Constitution of Mexico (1917), which stands out as the world's first constitution to include extensive social and economic guarantees and protections, such as provisions regarding labor, agrarian reform, and the social dimension of property rights.

Madero's reformist government was considered too progressive by some and not radical enough by others. It had to contend with several rebellions led by different revolutionary and counterrevolutionary factions until it was overthrown in a military coup in February 1913. Subsequently, both Madero and Pino Suárez were assassinated on the orders of General Victoriano Huerta, the dictator who replaced them. In 1969, María Cámara Vales, Pino Suárez's widow, received the Belisario Domínguez Medal of Honor from the Senate of Mexico, recognizing the sacrifice that the couple had made for the country.

== Youth and studies ==
=== Family origins ===
Born in Tenosique, Tabasco, "almost by accident – his family was among the most notable in Mérida." He was the eldest son of José María Pino Salvatiel, a businessman, and Josefa Suarez; both his parents had been born in Mérida. A few years after his birth, his mother died, an event that was devastating for the young boy. He had a younger brother, Néstor Pino Suárez who served as a colonel and was mortally wounded in battle in 1912, trying to end the Quintero insurrection in Sinaloa.

His great-grandfather was Pedro Sainz de Baranda (1787–1845), a Naval Officer, industrialist and liberal politician born in San Francisco de Campeche, who having trained in the Spanish Navy, fought in the Battle of Trafalgar. Afterwards, he was a deputy in the constituent assembly which drafted the liberal Spanish Constitution of 1812, before returning to Mexico to fight in the Mexican War of Independence and played an important role in founding the Mexican Navy. Under his command, Mexico captured the Fort of San Juan de Ulúa in Veracruz, the last remainder of Mexican territory still in Spanish hands, successfully thwarting a Spanish attempt to reconquer Mexico. Prior to his death in 1845, he served as Governor of Yucatán and is also credited with introducing the Industrial Revolution to Mexico, founding Aurora Yucateca, the first textile factory in the country to use steam power.

Pino's great-uncles were Joaquín Baranda and Pedro Baranda. Joaquín had served as Chief justice of the Supreme Court of Justice, Governor of Campeche, Senator, and, between 1882 and 1901, was a long-serving Cabinet Minister, being appointed as Secretary of Justice, Education and, briefly, Foreign Affairs under presidents Manuel González and Porfirio Díaz. He became one of the most powerful Cabinet Ministers of the porfiriato, but he resigned in 1901, after falling out with José Yves Limantour, the influential Secretary of the Treasury and head of the Cíentificos, a powerful group of technocrats; Limantour had demanded Baranda's resignation after the latter had, as Justice Secretary, successfully thwarted Limantour's presidential arguing that he was constitutionally ineligible to be president due to his French origins. During his time in government, Joaquín Baranda was responsible for founding the Public Prosecutor's Office (Procuraduría General de la República) and the Normal school (Escuela Normal de Profesores). Meanwhile, his brother, General Pedro Baranda fought for the liberal cause in the Reform Wars and the French Intervention, and participated in the constituent assembly that drafted the liberal Constitution of 1857. Later in his career, he promoted the creation of the states of Campeche and Morelos, serving as Governor of both states. In Campeche, the influence of the Baranda brothers was such that for many years, the State Capital was known as Campeche de Baranda:

“ [Pedro Baranda] came from the highest echelons of southeastern political royalty. [He] haled from a Campeche-based family long active in civil and military affairs. His father, Pedro Sáinz de Baranda, [...] had championed a socially conservative, gaditano independence; shortly thereafter, he founded the famous Aurora Yucateca cotton mill in Valladolid, a bold experiment in industrial revolution […] Pedro himself had fought […] to create the state of Campeche, then fought against the interventionists in Tabasco. Promoted to the rank of General by Juárez, he then served as first Governor of Morelos and later as the Senator from Campeche. The honorific "Campeche de Baranda" commemorates his role there, while an enormous statue of his father don Pedro the elder, sword tightly in hand, greets the modern day motorist along the city's malecón.

Another uncle of Pino Suárez was Joaquín Casasús, a lawyer, economist, diplomat, and banker who was a leading member of the influential Cíentificos group and made a substantial fortune representing American and British interests in Mexico. He at one time served as Mexican Ambassador to the United States and managed to obtain a favorable arbitration ruling for Mexico in the Chamizal dispute, a border conflict with the United States.

His first cousin, Luis Felipe Domínguez Suárez would later serve two terms as Governor of Tabasco.

=== Education ===
Shortly after Pino's birth, his mother died. His father, a busy businessman, entrusted his education to a Private Tutor. When Pino reached adolescence, it was decided that he should study in Mérida, where he lived in the house of Raúl Carrancá, a close friend of his father, who was then the Spanish Consul. His son, Raúl Carrancá y Trujillo, would later become an outstanding criminal defense lawyer. In Mérida, Pino was admitted to the prestigious Colegio de San Ildefonso, a Jesuit-run grammar school that had a curriculum based on the French Lycées. During those years, Pino became a close friend of Norberto Domínguez, then the headmaster, who would later become Archbishop of Yucatan. Pino graduated from San Ildefonso speaking fluent French and English. He obtained his law degree from Instituto Literario de Yucatán in 1894.

=== Marriage and descendants ===
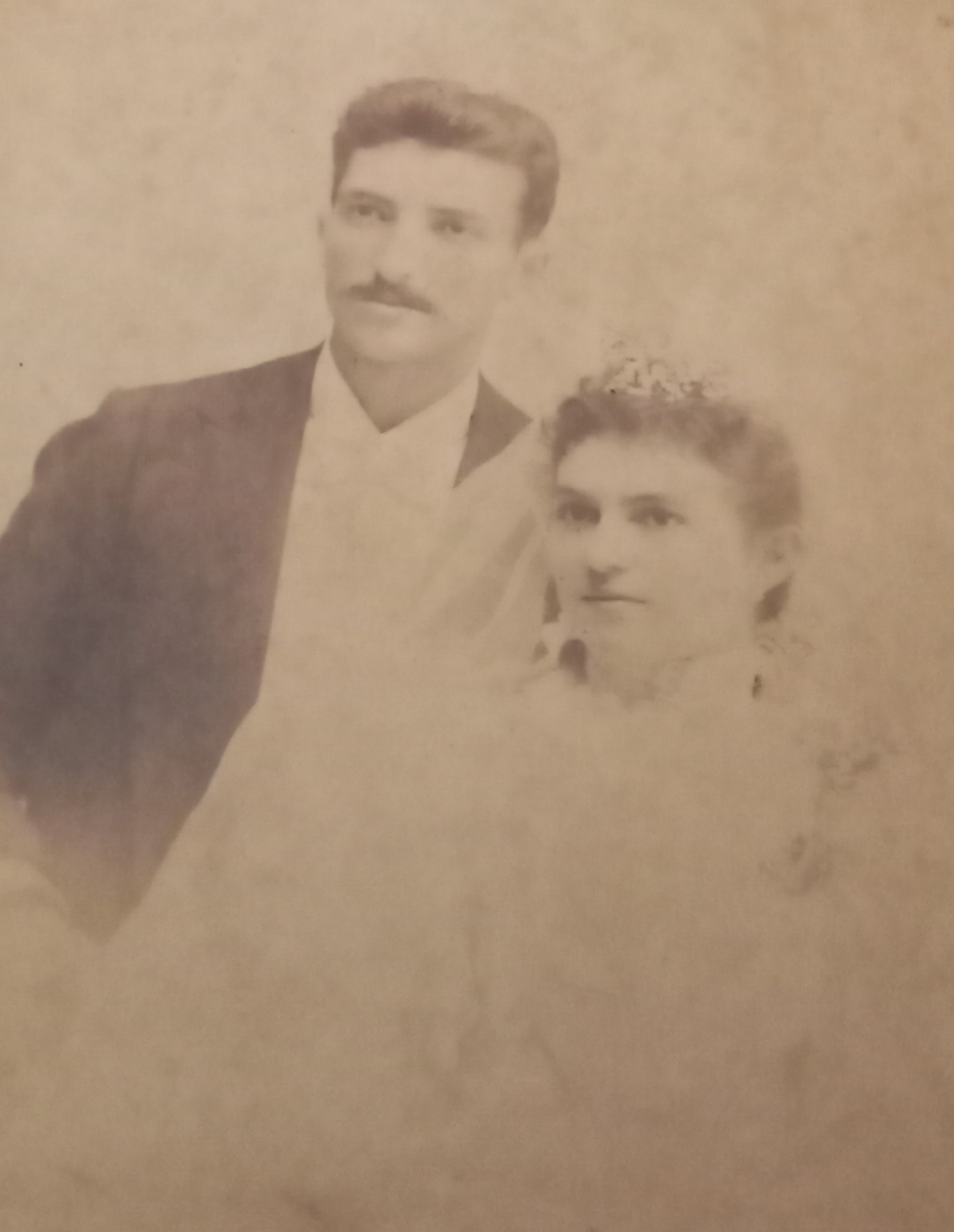
José María Pino Suárez and María Cámara Vales on their wedding day (1896).

In 1896, he married María Cámara Vales, the eldest daughter of Raymundo Cámara Luján, a business magnate and head of the House of Cámara, "a powerful clan of the high Yucatecan aristocracy." Her uncle was Agustín Vales Castillo, an industrialist and banker who served as the Mayor of Mérida between 1902 and 1907. Two of Marías brothers had political careers of their own: Nicolás Camára Vales served as Governor of Yucatán, while Alfredo Pino Cámara served as Governor of Quintana Roo.

The Pino Cámara couple had six children: Maria, Alfredo, José, Aída, Hortensia and Cordelia. When Pino Suárez died in February 1913, at the age of 43, María, the eldest of his daughters was a 14-year-old teenager while Cordelia, the youngest one, had not celebrated her first birthday.

His two sons, Alfredo and José, followed in their father's footsteps, excelling in the legal profession. Alfredo Pino Cámara, was an Associate justice of the Supreme court and is remembered for having acted as presiding judge in the criminal proceedings against Tina Modotti, the Italian actress and photographer accused of the First Degree Murder of Julio Antonio Mella, a political activist and one of the founders of the Communist Party of Cuba.

Several of his daughters married off into well-known Yucatecan business families. María, her eldest daughter, married Fernando Ponce Alonzo in her first marriage. Ponce Alonzo was the grandson of José María Ponce Solís, the founder of Cervecería Yucateca, an important brewery which was sold by the Ponce family to Grupo Modelo in the 1980s. In her second marriage, she married José González Sada, an industrialist who was the first cousin both of president Francisco I. Madero and Eugenio Garza Sada, chairman and CEO of the Cuauhtémoc Moctezuma Brewery and founder of Tecnológico de Monterrey. Similarly, Cordelia married Patricio Escalante Guerra, the grandson of Eusebio Escalante Bates, the wealthy industrialist responsible for developing the henequen industry in Yucatán; meanwhile, his great uncle was Carlos Peón Machado, a liberal politician who served as Governor of Yucatán; between 1894 and 1897.

His grandson, Ismael Moreno Pino, served as deputy foreign secretary and Ambassador of Mexico to Germany, The Netherlands, Chile, the OAS in Washington, D.C., and the United Nations in New York City and Geneva, Switzerland. He was one of the key negotiators of the Treaty of Tlatelolco which led to the denuclearization of Latin America.

== Early career ==
=== Early years: lawyer and businessman ===
Newly wed, the Pino Cámara couple moved to Mexico City where Pino founded a law firm with his uncle, Joaquín Casasús, a distinguished jurist who had extensive connections with los Cientificos, the circle of technocratic advisors of President Díaz.

Around 1899, he returned to Mérida where he undertook commercial activities in partnership with his father-in-law, Raymundo Cámara Luján, a wealthy businessman with close ties to the Yucatecan oligarchy (known as the Divine Caste). At that time, the export house headed by Cámara Luján and José María Ponce Solís, exported 16% of the total bales of henequen fiber that was exported to the US and European markets, which had an insatiable demand for the Yucatecan monoculture. Unlike other businessmen, Cámara Luján focused on the export of henequen and not on its production, finding that this business was more profitable. Similarly, unlike other Yucatecan capitalists, he had diversified his business interests to include railways, banking and brewing. In association with Eusebio Escalante Bates, he was owner of Compañía Agrícola del Cuyo y Anexas, S.A, a company which owned a private estate of 2,627 km^{2} in the northwestern part of Yucatán (roughly the size of Luxembourg or Rhode Island) which was used to exploit various raw materials such as chicle, sugar cane, tobacco, cocoa, cotton, banana, vanilla and various forest resources.48 The dyewood and chicle were destined for export to the US and European markets.

By the end of the 19th century, the henequen boom had transformed Mérida into the city with the most millionaires per capita in the world; between 1870 and 1920, henequen comprised 20% of Mexico's total exports, making it the second largest product in Mexico. most important Mexican exportable after precious metals. Much of this wealth had been concentrated in the hands of a small number of Yucatecan families of European descent (criollos). The rivalry between various business groups intensified in the first decade of the 20th century. On the one hand were Eusebio Escalante, José María Ponce Solís, Carlos Peón and Cámara Luján himself, who represented a group of capitalists "made up of the traditional landowning families [...] whose prestige came from the viceregal era and who 'demonstrated a mysterious ability to adapt to the changing economic order'." On the other hand, there was Olegario Molina, whose fortune was newly minted but who intended to make use of the political and economic power that he monopolized as Governor of Yucatán and Secretary of Commerce and Industry to create a lucrative monopoly over the Henequen industry. In 1902, he signed a secret pact with Cyrus McCormick, the American businessman who headed International Harvester, to depress the prices of Henequen and force his competition into bankruptcy.

In 1899, the couple returned to Mérida where Pino Suárez undertook business activities in partnership with his father-in-law, Raymundo Cámara Luján. After the financial panic of 1907, the Escalante export house, one of the major henequen trading houses collapsed. Eusebio Escalante Bates had been a close business ally of Cámara Luján and his bankruptcy surprised the entire society of Mérida as well as financial circles in Mexico City, New York City and Paris. Many wealthy entrepreneurs and individuals lost significant sums of capital while the rival group of businessmen, headed by Olegario Molina profited: "rarely in history has one business benefited so much from the misfortune of another. The fall of the Escalante House ensured Molina's dominance over the key sectors of the regional economy." Faced with this situation, several landowners from traditional families, including the Cámara family, distanced themselves from Molina and the federal government headed by Porfirio Díaz. Faced with this situation, several traditional businessmen, including Cámara Luján, distanced themselves from Molina and the government of Porfirio Díaz, who supported him. These events surely influenced the young lawyer.

=== Man-of-Letters ===
In his spare time, Pino was also an accomplished poet, having published two volumes: Melancolias (1896) and Procelarias (1903). He also wrote the prologue to Memorias de un alférez (Memoires of an Ensign), written by Eligio Ancona in 1904, his close friend.

Shortly before he died, he wrote to his friend, Serapio Rendón, asking him to rescue a third volume that he was preparing that would be titled Constellations; Unfortunately, this last volume of poems was never published:

In the drawers of my desk, I keep some manuscripts that have nothing to do with politics, since they are literary outlines written in a rush. Try to get them from the Undersecretary, who knows the passcode. If you get them, please give them to my wife. I don't want them to become lost or to be seen by profane eyes. You will find the little volume called Constellations written on blue paper at the bottom of the drawer on the right, under several letters of a private nature.

In 1912, when Marcelino Menéndez Pelayo died, Pino Suárez received a letter from Alejandro Pidal y Mon, director of the Royal Spanish Academy, proposing to fill the vacant chair. Pino Suárez, then Vice President of the Republic, rejected the distinction citing his excessive workload. The chair was finally occupied by Jacinto Benavente.

=== Founder of El Peninsular ===
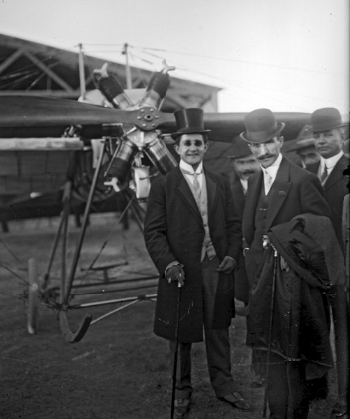
Pino Suárez visits the Aerial Exhibition, accompanied by Gerald Brandon, a journalist.

Since 1904 Pino Suárez had liquidated his partnership with his father-in-law and had decided to reinvest his capital in the foundation of El Peninsular, a newspaper from which he would criticize the monopoly headed by Olegario Molina.

The newspaper's editor-in-chief was Ignacio Ancona Horruytiner, a close friend of his and the nephew of Eligio Ancona, the 19th century liberal statesman. Pino Suárez and Ancona "were representatives of the liberal youth and with El Peninsular they gave voice to a critical sector of the Yucatecan social structure; a criticism coming from the same local political and business elite that had been sidelined with the rise of Olegario Molina. The newspaper headed by Pino and Ancona gave a voice to a generation educated by the "liberal" institutions of Yucatan, trained in the tradition of historical liberalism but which had been born in the period of Porfirian peace, a group which, regardless of their affiliation, was not allowed social, economic and political ascent during the first decade of the 20th century."

Pino Suárez gathered some of the most brilliant minds in the Yucatecan intelligentsia to work at the newspaper, including Serapio Rendón, who would later serve as a maderista Congressman before being brutally assassinated by the Huerta régime. Another journalist and future politician who worked for the newspaper was Alberto Ancona Albertos, a Pino protégé who would later become a drafter of the 1917 Mexican constitution, a three-term Senator and Governor of Yucatán in the 1920s. Other distinguished journalists who worked for El Peninsular included Serapio Baqueiro Barrera and Ricardo Mimenza Castillo.

At its launch, the newspaper was very successful:

"El Peninsular was born as a modern newspaper, capable of continuously incorporating into its workshops the most innovative instruments in terms of typefaces, vignettes, cliches, linotypes, rotary presses or composition tables, as well as its telegraphic service, which allowed it to have national and international news earlier than its competitors. It had a constantly increasing circulation due to its coverage of the Yucatan Peninsula and some states of the Gulf of Mexico. Apparently, it came to a market already covered by an ample supply of publications. However, its dynamism managed to capture the attention of the Mexico City press, particularly El Mundo and El Imparcial. As a newcomer, El Peninsular quickly and successfully established itself in the taste of the public and managed to dictate the journalistic agenda. If as an editorial project it was intended to be a model of hard news journalism, the fact of having established newsrooms in Campeche and Quintana Roo, placed it as an attempt to achieve regional integration through the press.

The newspaper, however, soon had to face off attacks from Molina and his supporters:

Curiously enough, this evening paper was noted for its national and international news service, such as its review of the Russo-Japanese War. During its first year of circulation the paper gained many subscribers and advertisers. However, the denunciations of the system of exploitation of the peasants in some henequen haciendas that appeared after February 1905 provoked the anger of the landowners, who pressured companies to remove advertisements and readers to cancel their subscription to the point of threatening the newspaper's financial stability. In his efforts to maintain the newspaper and defend freedom of speech against such pressures, Pino Suárez participated in August of that year in the founding of the "Asociación de la Prensa Yucateca" (Yucatan Press Association), of which he served as vice-chairman. It seems to have been then, defending his newspaper, that he caught his first glimpse of his political vocation."

Pino Suárez "expressed his open and clear repudiation of the bad treatment received by the serfs of the large plantations", chiefly the Maya and Yaqui indigenous peoples, as well as indentured Asians (chiefly Chinese and Korean immigrants) forced to work as slaves on henequen haciendas. The conditions faced by these labourers is aptly described by Professor Timothy J. Henderson in the following excerpt:

To ensure the latter enticement – cheap labor – the Díaz government outlawed labor unions and gave employees carte blanche to behave as callously as they wished. Repression of labor during the Porfiriato […] was notorious. One of the most famous accounts, journalist John Kenneth Turner's aptly titled Barbarous Mexico, contains harrowing descriptions of Maya and Yaqui Indians forced to work as slaves on hemp plantations under the brutal sun of Yucatán, starting well before daylight and ending well after sunset, their day's only meal a couple of tortillas, a cup of beans, and a bowl of rancid fish broth […] American capitalists found the lure of so much cheap labor well-nigh irresistible. Ex-president Ulysses S. Grant, toward the end of his life, took to preaching boundless opportunities for American capital in Mexico, mostly because, in addition to many valuable natural resources, Mexico could furnish workers who were ‘industrious, frugal and willing to work for a pittance, if afforded an opportunity’."

Felipe Carrillo Puerto, the future Governor of Yucatán, would later relate that in opposing the enslavement of the plantation laborers, Pino Suárez had first "fanned the revolutionary flame." Beginning in March 1905, Pino Suárez "began to publish a series of articles in which he attempted to analyze in depth the problem of labor relations on the henequen haciendas. This series, entitled Servitude in the fields of Yucatán, consisted of six articles" and argued "that the laborers were not "free" as a result of various practices that originated in colonial times and that kept the indigenous people in a state of degradation."

Although slavery had been prohibited by the Federal Constitution of 1824, the serfs continued to live in conditions akin to slavery. They were prohibited from leaving the farms where they worked because they were subject to debt mechanisms, those who protested were whipped and imprisoned by their employers. Pino Suárez pointed out that the use of whipping was a "degrading practice" and proposed establishing a minimum wage for day laborers and guaranteeing their mobility and ability to seek employment elsewhere and negotiate their employment conditions. Having trained as a lawyer, Pino Suárez pointed out that serfdom in Yucatán, in addition to being unfair, violated the Federal Constitution of 1857 that prohibited slavery and guaranteed the rights of transit (article 11), education (article 11) and labor (articles 3 and 4). He also accused "the Molinista regime of having disregarded its obligation to integrate of the indigenous people into public life and promoting the installation of schools on the haciendas which could provide compulsory secular education."

Pino Suárez's articles have been criticized, either because he disseminated an "idealized image of the Yucatecan indigenous peoples" or, according to contemporary Molinista newspapers, because by placing the rights of the indigenous peoples above the interests of the white population (criollo), he showed that he did not "love Yucatan." In the context of the Caste War of Yucatán, the ethnic conflict between the maya people and the criollos that had just ended in 1901, this criticism was particularly damaging in the eyes of predominantly white newspaper readers in Mérida, a city that had historically been inhabited almost exclusively by people of European descent. Although Pino Suárez was the son of meridano parents and had been raised, educated and married in Mérida, the Molinista newspapers did not miss any opportunity to remind their readers that he had been born in Tabasco and was, therefore, alien to Yucatán. Dominated by a powerful criollo oligarchy, known as "the Divine Caste", the Yucatán Peninsula had long considered itself autonomous from the rest of Mexico and had a long history of separatism.

The newspaper also criticized the role of Olegario Molina in his two facets as a leading politician and businessman: "State officials were so wary of criticism of any kind that they shut down [...] El Peninsular, in October, for having the temerity to argue that Molina did not deserve a second term." Molina reacted to the criticism, forcing the oligarchy to withdraw its support for the newspaper: "although Pino Suárez did not go to jail, the withdrawal of subscribers and advertisers promoted by Manuel Sierra Méndez and Rafael Peón was a hard blow that forced him to sell El Peninsular, which remained in the hands of two of his brother-in-laws; Nicolás and Raymundo Cámara Vales."

After this event, the Pino Cámara family withdrew from public life, going to live for two years to the Polyuc Hacienda, a remote sugar plantation

== Political career ==
=== Maderismo and the 1909 local elections ===
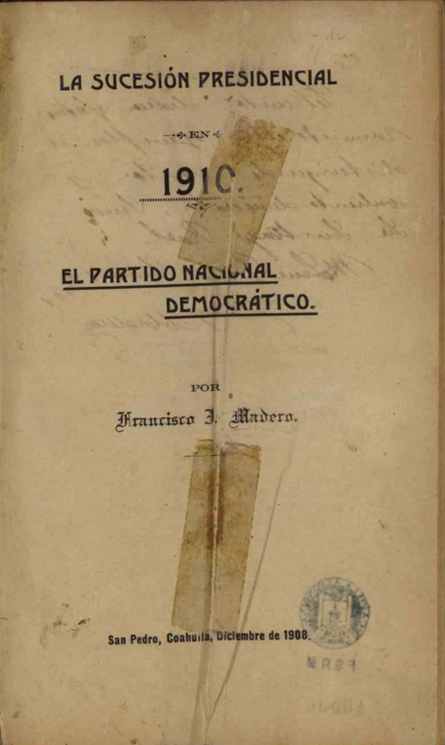
The Presidential Succession in 1910. – a book which would change the course of Mexican history.

In December 1908, Francisco I. Madero, published The Presidential Succession in 1910, which argued in favor of a transition from the military dictatorship of Porfirio Díaz. who had governed the country for thirty years, toward a liberal democracy. His supporters became known as Maderistas or Antireleccionistas, due to their opposition to Mexican presidents seeking reelection, a prohibition which remain in effect to this date. Madero, who had been born in into one of the wealthiest families of industrialists in the country, had been educated in élite schools in France and the United States before returning to Mexico with liberal and progressive ideals.

Pino Suárez had retired from public life since his newspaper had been censured in 1908, narrowly avoiding being imprisoned by the regime due to the impeccable connections of his political family. During his exile at Polyuc, he received a copy of the book and enthusiastically traveled to Progreso to meet Madero who was campaigning in Yucatán:

"In June 1909, Francisco I. Madero began his first political tour in Veracruz, seeking to dispute the presidency from Porfirio Díaz [...] he decided to continue towards Yucatan, but when he arrived at Progreso, only six people were waiting for him. Amongst these were two important figures: Delio Moreno Cantón a gubernatorial candidate for the Independent Electoral Center and Pino [...] Madero's disappointment at the low turnout was temporary, not only because as soon as he arrived in Mérida a large crowd acclaimed him, but because of his encounter with Pino, who from then on would become a true friend. Mysteriously, or perhaps logically, the spiritist [Madero] had found a kindred soul in the poet [Pino ]."

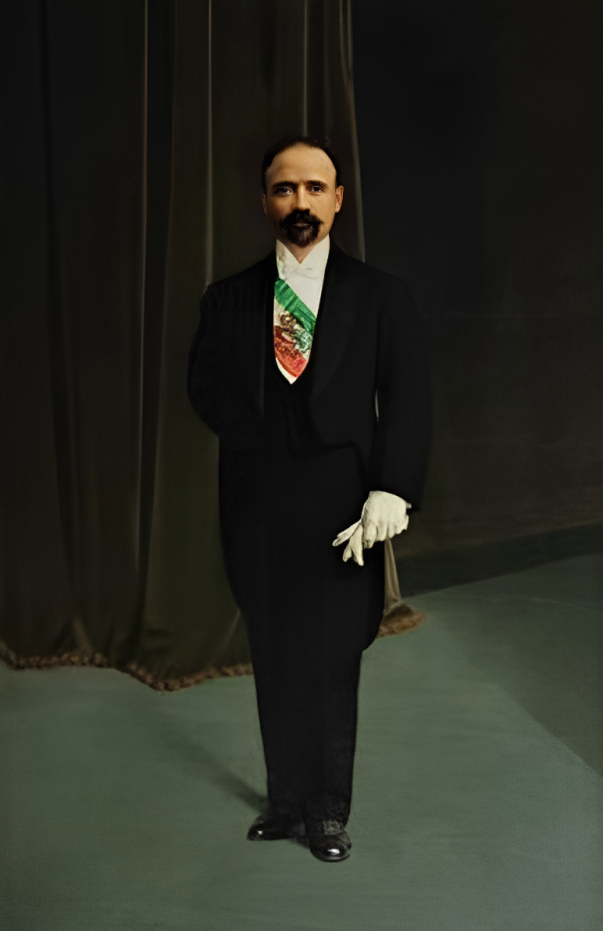
Francisco I. Madero, 37th President of Mexico between 1911 and 1913.

Supporting the Maderista cause, Pino founded and presided over the Anti-Reelectionist Club in Mérida, which initially supported Delio Moreno as a candidate for governor in the 1909 elections. Madero knew that the oppositionist candidacy would not have the opportunity to overthrow the ruling party (Molinistas), which at that time was headed by Governor Enrique Muñoz Aristegui, a mere figurehead for Olegario Molina. However, he believed that Moreno's candidacy could establish the necessary foundations to ensure the triumph of anti-reelectionism in future elections.

Pino eventually withdrew his support for Moreno Cantón upon learning that he had sent a commission headed by José Vales Castillo to the capital of the Republic to confer with President Díaz and propose a list of candidates for the governorship so that the dictator could choose as he saw fit: the list included Luis del Carmen Curiel, Alfonso Cámara y Cámara, as well as Moreno himself, all of whom were "active porfiristas, although they later would declare, they had always been anti-reelectionists at heart." In this way, the opposition to Governor Muñoz Aristegui was divided between the followers of Delio Moreno (Morenistas) who negotiated with the military dictatorship to obtain power and the followers of José María Pino (Pinistas) who refused to do so.

Through an evident electoral fraud, the victory was granted to Muñoz Aristegui, the official candidate. The reelected state government almost immediately started a political persecution against the losing candidates that forced them to temporarily flee the state.

The Muñoz Arístegui administration repressed, exiled, and imprisoned many of its political opponents. The morenista opposition was mobilized, leading to the Rebelión de Valladolid. This in turn provoked an even more violent reaction from the local government against the rebels. Faced with this wave of repression, the Morenistas went underground. Meanwhile, Pino was also forced to leave the state, settling in the neighboring state of Tabasco.

Given the situation of violence and repression in Yucatan, President Porfirio Díaz decided to send a military general with experience in matters of war to ensure control of the situation. On 11 March 1911, Governor Enrique Muñoz Arístegui was relieved of power by General Luis del Carmen Curiel, whose candidacy was supported by the Morenistas. Those in the opposition that had negotiated with the military dictatorship had gained access to the levers of power while those who had refused to do so remained in the political wilderness.

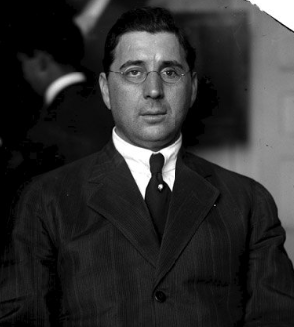
Gustavo Madero, the president's brother, was the grey eminence of the Maderista movement. Pino established "a strong friendship" with him. Going forward, Gustavo would "unconditionally support Pino in the Maderista movement."

=== The 1910 Revolution ===
At the beginning of June 1910, Madero undertook what would be his fifth and last tour as a candidate for the presidency in the 1910 Mexican general election. While he was canvassing in Monterrey, the government decided to arrest him, an action that was "clumsy, counterproductive and tardy. Madero had already visited 22 states and founded no less than a hundred political clubs." A political prisoner, Madero was transferred to the penitentiary at San Luis Potosí.

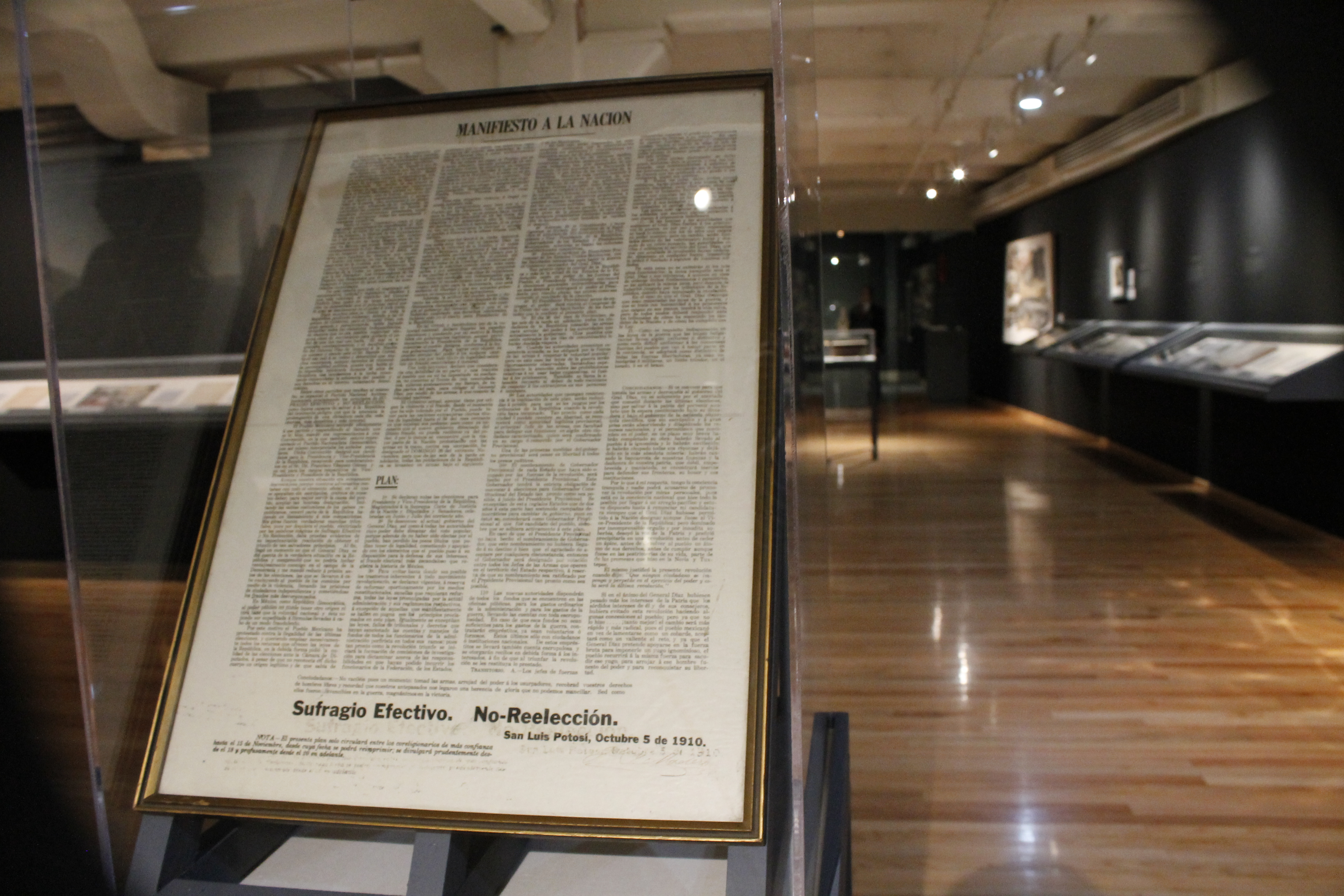
Plan of San Luis Potosí (1910)

With the only opposition candidate in prison, the presidential elections were held in the first days of July 1910, fraudulently allowing the dictator to win his seventh reelection as President of the Republic. In October, Madero managed to escape from prison and fled into exile in San Antonio, Texas. From exile, Madero issued the Plan of San Luis Potosí in which he proclaimed that the results of the 1910 election had been fraudulent: "out of the clauses [of his plan], the main points were the immediate assumption of the presidency by Madero under a provisional government, his lack of recognition of the Díaz government, the restitution of land to dispossessed peoples and communities and the freedom of political prisoners" and a call to citizens "take up arms, throw usurpers out of power, recover your rights as free men". The date of the Revolution had been set for 20 November 1910. In his provisional government, Madero appointed Pino as Secretary of Justice.

When the Mexican Revolution broke out in November 1910, Pino was in exile in Tabasco, fleeing the brutal repression of Muñoz Arigestguí. From Tabasco, he tried to take up arms and prepare an invasion of the Yucatecan Peninsula. According to his military plans, he would lead the invasion from Campeche, for which he enlisted the support of Urbano Espinosa and Calixto Maldonado, though both men were apprehended upon arrival in Campeche and the government was able to collect all the orders and communications that Pino sent to all his supporters in Campeche and Yucatan, thus frustrating his attempt at revolution.

Like Madero before him, Pino was forced to leave the country, bound for exile, after learning from María Cámara Vales, his wife, that Porfirio Díaz had instructed his immediate arrest:

News reports coming in from Mexico City were alarming, these included the exile of Madero to the United States; meanwhile, rumors of drastic measures against the anti-reelectionists also arrived from Yucatan. Faced with these events, Pino sent his family to the home of a sister of Doña María who lived in San Juan Bautista [...] having just arrived there, a friendly government official transmitted the confidential instructions he had just received from the capital of the Republic to arrest her husband and send him to Mexico. But Doña María was no longer a weak and fearful woman she might have once been, pain had tempered her character and her anxiety permanently strengthened her resolution, she immediately decided to leave her children in the care of her sister and board the first available ship with the sole purpose of defending her life companion. As a dramatic coincidence, she happened to share the trip with the military officials that had been sent out by the federal government to arrest Pino; the most tremendous anguish took hold of her spirit at the thought that they might reach their destination at the same time as her, but undaunted, she manages to conceive a plan; the boat they had boarded set sail at night and spent the day moored in the various riverside towns on their itinerary, loading and unloading cargo; On the first such stop, she onboards the ship, manages to get hold of a horse, which she dispatches carrying the message which will save her husband. The ship continued its route and upon reaching Montecristo, the head of the military escort learns to his chagrin that Pino cannot be found; María instantly knows that her effort had not been in vain, for, receiving her message, her husband had managed to leave the Chablé estate he was staying, heading to Guatemala and from there on the United States to meet with Madero. She returned to the state capital along with the disappointed picket of soldiers… maintaining the austerity of her demeanor, she nevertheless had a wet and singular shine in her eyes: Pino was safe.

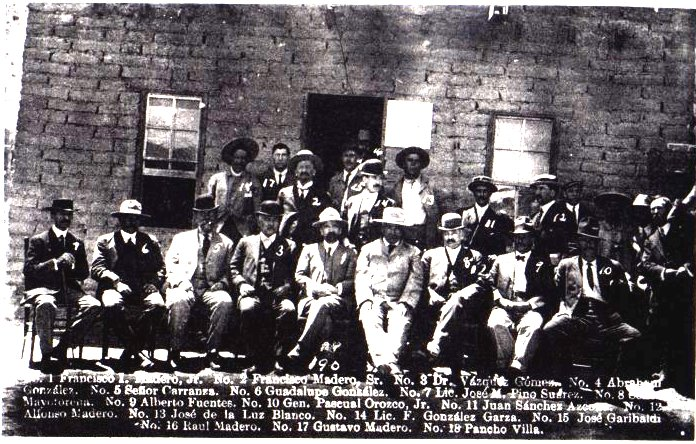
Leaders of the 1910 Revolution are pictured after their victory at the Battle of Ciudad Juárez in May 1911. Pino Suárez is pictured seated in the far left.

Persecuted by express order of the President of the Republic, Pino had to cross the border to Guatemala from "where he undertook his pilgrimage through the mountains to the English colony of British Honduras [modern day Belize], where he tried to get in touch again with his political supporters in search for supplies to send to the revolutionary expedition, he had instructed to invade the coasts of Yucatan and Campeche." However, the triumph of the Revolution in the north of the country would render the military campaign that Pino was preparing in the south of the Republic, with the assistance of general Luis Felipe Domínguez Suárez, his cousin, completely unnecessary.

Exiled in Texas, Pino seized the opportunity to become closer to the Maderista leadership, particularly with Gustavo Madero, the "grey eminence" of the Maderista movement with whom he established "a strong friendship" and who would, going forward, "unconditionally support Pino in the Maderista movement."

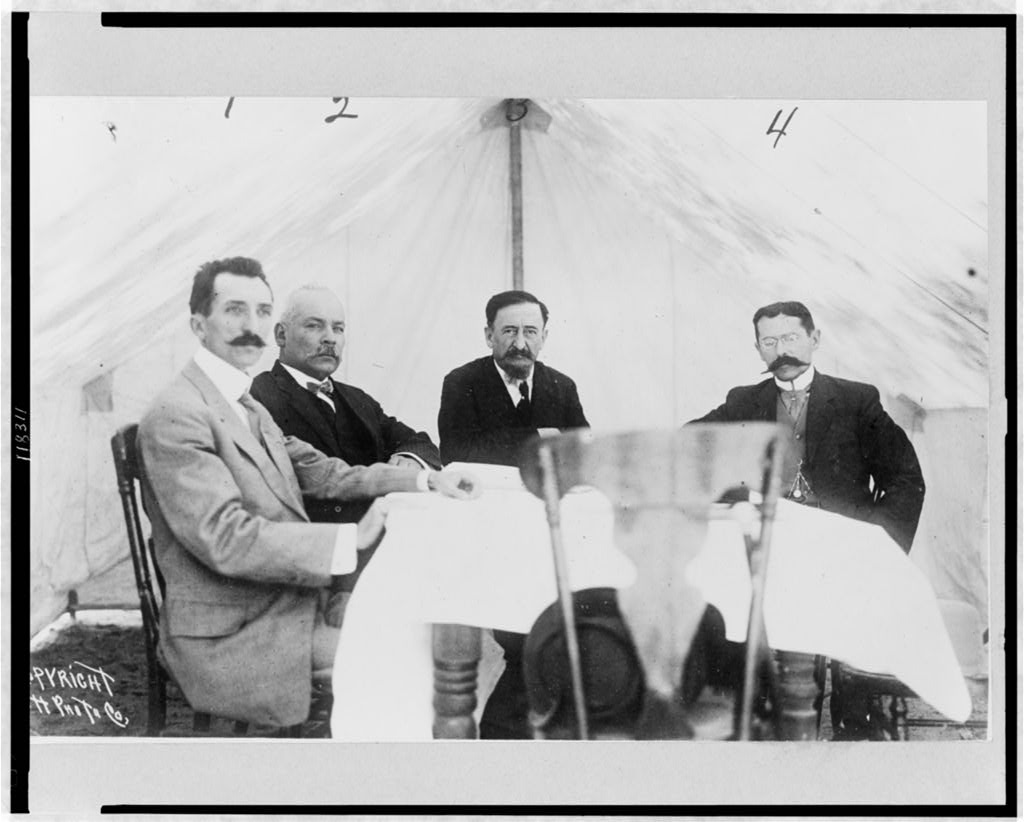
The Peace Commissioners (from left to right): José María Pino Suárez, Dr. Francisco Vázquez Gomez, Francisco Madero Hernández, and Francisco S. Carvajal seated around a table, during the signing of the Treaty of Ciudad Juarez (1911)

After his return to Mexico, Pino Suárez participated in the Battle of Ciudad Juárez, a key city in the north of Mexico that fell to the hands of the revolutionaries on 10 May 1911, an important military victory for their cause. Faced with the loss of this important border city, President Díaz's advisers, headed by José Yves Limantour, Secretary of the Treasury, became convinced that the dictator must resign to avoid a civil war and a possible military intervention by the United States. The government decided to negotiate with the rebels and appointed Francisco S. Carvajal, a prominent jurist, as its representative.

Along with Francisco Vázquez Gómez and Francisco Madero Hernández (Madero's father), Pino Suárez was appointed Maderista Peace Commissioner, responsible for negotiating with the federal government the terms of the Treaty of Ciudad Juárez, which would be signed on 21 May 1911. Momentously, the Treaties would mean the overthrow of the Porfirio Díaz regime after more than thirty years in power. However, they would also be harshly criticized since they ensured the dismissal of the Rebel army, thereby placing a future Madero government at the mercy of a Porfirista Federal Army that was hostile to their cause and which would eventually overthrow the Madero and Pino administration in February 1913. Venustiano Carranza, one of Madero's main advisers had advised against signing the Treaties of Ciudad Juárez, saying that "a revolution that compromises is a revolution that is lost."

To preserve the constitutional order, the Treaties of Ciudad Juárez ensured that upon the resignation of President Díaz and Vice President Ramón Corral, Francisco León de la Barra, then the Foreign Secretary, would assume executive power as interim president until such time as 1911 Mexican general elections were held.

=== Governor of Yucatán ===
In mid-1911, after the triumph of the Maderista revolution, General Curiel submitted his resignation to the State Congress, which accepted it and appointed Pino interim governor of Yucatan. As interim governor of the state, Pino's fundamental responsibility was to call special state elections to elect a constitutional governor in the face of the vacancy caused by the resignation of Muñoz Aristegui. In order not to influence the elections in which he would be a candidate, Pino withdrew from the governorship in August 1911; the state congress left the executive power in the hands of Jesús L. González who assumed the interim governorship.

Pino's appointment provoked strong protests and violent reactions among the supporters of Delio Moreno Canton who soon undertook "more energetic and violent actions...citizens were frequently awakened by screams, gunshots and the explosion of bombs, watching in amazement as houses burned of the government officials or the henequen fields of the “Pinista" landowners. In some towns it was even necessary to organize night surveillance and public lighting services to prevent attacks. During the day, the Morenistas organized rallies and marches that defiantly paraded through the streets, symbolically storming the municipal palace and the police station."

As interim governor of the state, Pino's fundamental responsibility was to call special state elections to elect a constitutional governor in the face of the vacancy caused by the resignation of Muñoz Aristegui. In order not to influence the elections in which he would be a candidate, Pino withdrew from the governorship in August 1911; the state congress left the executive power in the hands of Jesús L. González who assumed the interim governorship. In the election, Pino contended for the governorship against Moreno Cantón.

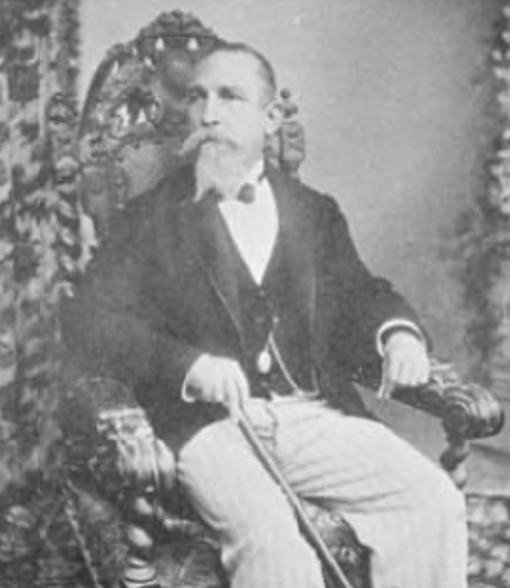
Pino Suárez was the ideological successor of Carlos Peón, a former Governor of Yucatan (1894–97), who believed in classical liberalism and who had been inspired by the French Revolution, being described as a "millionaire landowner [who] loved to present himself as a kind of Yucatecan Count Mirabeau".

Moreno Cantón was the political successor of his uncle, Francisco Cantón Rosado, a populist former Governor who had been close to the clergy. The Morenistas were demagogic and anti-elitist and their electoral base was mostly made up of serfs, working classes and artisans.

Pino Suárez, on the other hand, was the ideological successor of Carlos Peón, a former Governor, who believed in classical liberalism and who had been inspired by the French Revolution, being described as a "millionaire landowner [who] loved to present himself as a kind of Yucatecan Count Mirabeau". Thus, "pinismo gathered all the urban and rural clientele of the old peoncismo, led by landowners and businessmen and had the adherence of part of the intellectual sectors of Mérida". Among the followers of Pino, were Humberto Carlos Peón Suárez, son of Carlos Peón Machado, who in 1911 was elected alderman of the Mérida City Council, with Fernando Solís León elected as Maderista Mayor.

Although Pino Suárez had entered politics to oppose slavery in the plantations and out of conviction in Madero's democratic ideals, he never sought to ingratiate himself with the popular classes as Moreno Cantón had done, showing clear traces of political opportunism. For a revolutionary politician, Pino Suárez's family background was a liability that made it difficult for him to connect with the working classes and serfs with the same ease as Moreno Cantón; Pino Suárez's family had had close ties to the liberal elite that had ruled the country since the Reform War while his in-laws descended from the conservative landed aristocracy of New Spain.

Pino's political moderation and his closeness to the ruling classes have been harshly criticized as not being in line with revolutionary values, pointing out that he:

“Maintained the previous power structure, carrying out agreements with the most powerful families of the regional oligarchy, [...] publicly condemning the "subversive" Morenista propaganda which he considered responsible for the imminent outbreak of a second Caste War… These actions which Pino undertook were not quite "revolutionary" but they did win over the vast majority of the families of the state's economic elite to the Maderista cause. Those who were Molinistas became Maderistas, as did former "liberal" supporters of former Governor Carlos Peón, politically inactive since the political crisis of 1897. Indeed, one of Pino Suárez's most prominent protectors was Augusto Peón, one of the wealthiest landowners, [who]…directly supported the Maderista leader, hauling-in his peasants to vote for him. The Cámara, Medina, Vales, Espejo, Castellanos, Escalante, Manzanilla and Peniche families [all important landowners] became supporters of Pinismo. The defection of the powerful Peniche family, from Espita, which had been a faithful supporter of the Molina regime, is an example of the attitude assumed by most of the wealthy groups in the state."

The former supporters of Olegario Molina quickly decided to support Pino Suárez. In this sense, he successfully managed to get the Molinista oligarchy in Yucatán to change sides and support him, something that Madero would not achieve in the capital with the Porfirian oligarchy. The support of the large landowners was decisive in securing Pino's victory as governor since "the majority of the haciendas...continued to play the traditional role of electoral fiefdom of the landowners, as the flow of the votes of the peasant would reflect the political orientation of the landowners."

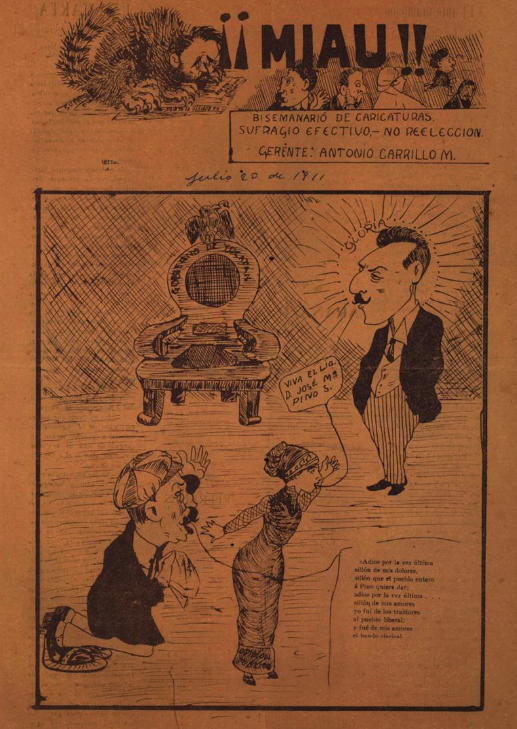
1911 caricature of Pino Suárez, with the seat of Governor of Yucatán open to him.

“It must be remembered, by the way, that at that time the large rural owners who had formed part of the old regime and supported the traditional (oligarchic) system, maintained their power; they were bound to the leaders of regional Maderismo, a movement which maintained more moderate positions – one could even describe them as conservative – than it did in other states. In fact, Pino Suárez's wife, María Cámara Vales, was the daughter of a landowning family with ample economic resources, which had maintained a close relationship with the old regime: her parents were Raymundo Cámara Luján and Carmen Vales Castillo. Meanwhile, one of María's brothers (Nicolás) would be governor of the state only a year later.”

In the election, those urban districts with large working class constituents voted for Moreno, while the countryside, dominated by the landowners, voted for Pino. Those regions which voted for Moreno would be the same ones would later be "dominated by the Socialist Party of Yucatan from 1920 onwards. If we add to this the fact that the majority of the socialists were initially followers of Moreno, leaders such as Felipe Carrillo Puerto, we can glimpse the close connection that existed between the populist Yucatecan Catholic tradition and the genesis of regional socialism" Meanwhile, the liberals, who followed Pino, were almost all opposed to socialism and did not have the support of the clergy.

In his brief tenure as Governor, Pino set out to liberally reform the Penal Code, which had previously been designed, under the old regime, to restrict fundamental rights. On 15 November 1911, shortly after assuming the governorship, Pino Suárez requested indefinite leave to assume the position of vice president for which he had been elected,

In Yucatán, meanwhile, the state congress appointed Nicolás Cámara Vales, brother-in-law of Pino Suárez, as governor, against whom Delio Moreno rebelled in the same year of 1911, starting an unsuccessful movement from the town of Opichén. Forced to leave the state, Moreno Canton joined the revolt led by Pascual Orozco in the north of the country. Later, he would support the military coup led by General Victoriano Huerta against the Maderista government.

=== 1911 Presidential elections ===
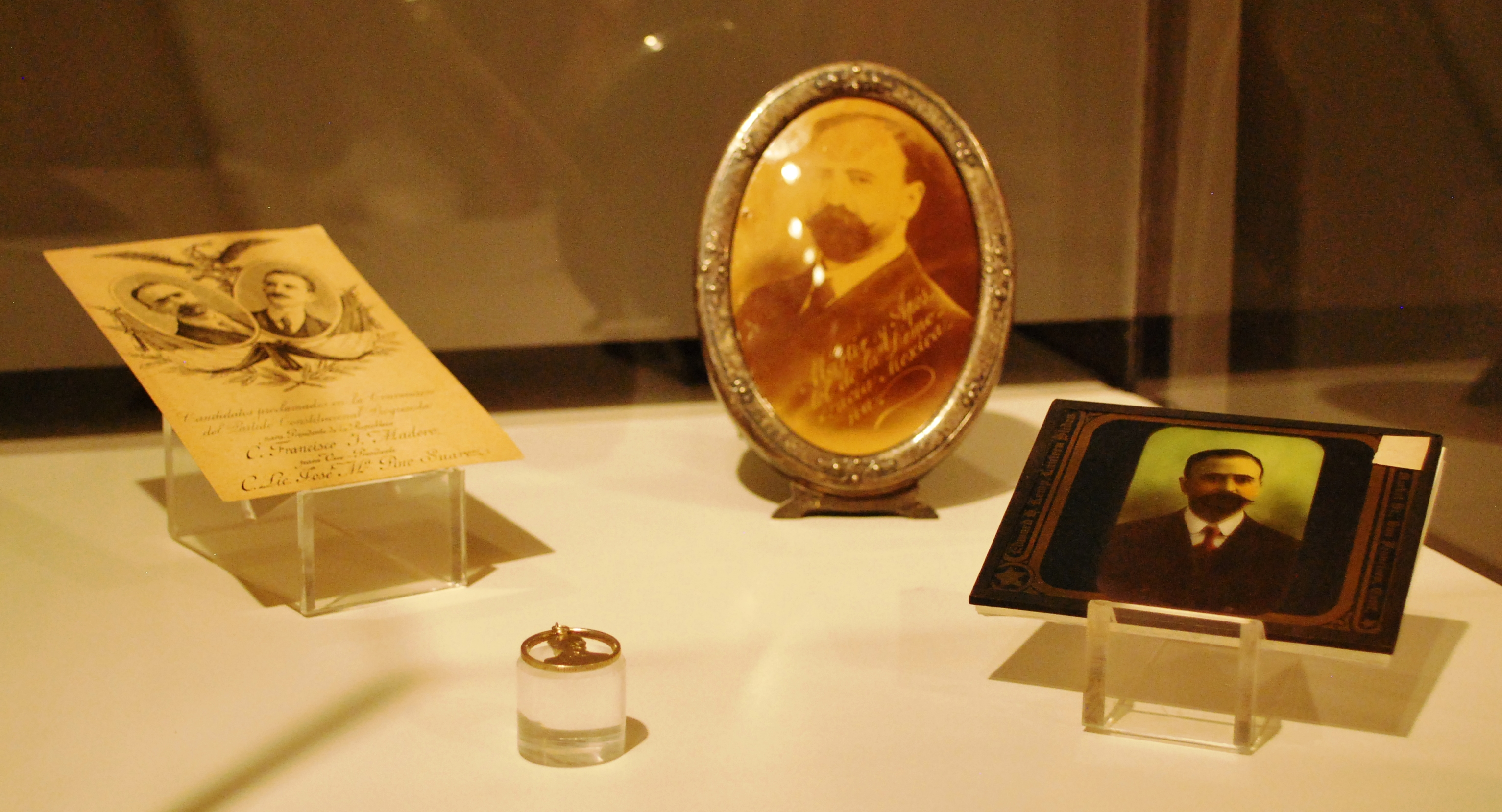
Items from the Madero-Pino Suárez campaign.

On 9 July 1911, Madero launched a manifesto creating the Progressive Constitutionalist Party (PCP) that replaced the National Anti-Reelectionist Party (PNA) since, having defeated President Díaz and modified the Constitution to prohibit Mexican presidents from seeking a second term, it no longer made sense to fight for anti-reelection. On 27 August, the delegates of the PCP met at the Teatro Hidalgo to decide who would occupy the candidacy for the presidency, deciding unanimously in favor of Madero. Next, on 2 September, the election of the candidate for the vice presidency of the Republic was carried out, with Pino's competing against Francisco Vázquez Gómez, Alfredo Robles Domínguez and Fernando Iglesias Calderón. Madero had declared himself in favor of Pino's election.

The vote was won by Pino with 876 votes against Francisco Vázquez Gómez's 469. However, there was immediate disagreement on the part of "some of the Vázquez supporters… [in] agreement with the result of the vote…[it was] proposed that a new compromise candidate be launched, who could be Federico González Garza, a proposal that It was rejected by the Assembly."

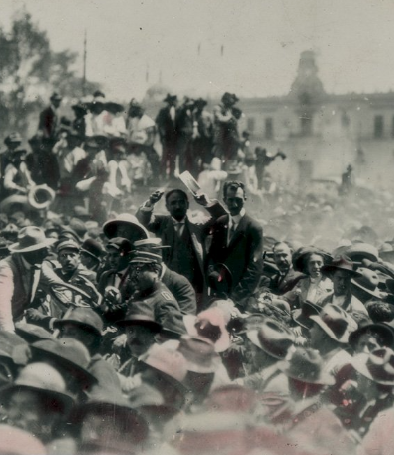
Madero and Pino Suárez arrived in Mexico City in July 1911, being cheered on by hundreds of thousands of supporters. At dawn, an earthquake in Michoacán registered a 7.8 magnitude and was felt in the Capital. After that, a popular rhyme circulated throughout the city: "the day Madero arrived even the earth trembled."

Francisco Vázquez Gómez did not accept the party's decision and decided to launch his own independent candidacy for the vice presidency. Meanwhile, the candidate of the Catholic party was Francisco León de la Barra, then interim president of the Republic. On 26 September, Madero and Pino arrived in Mexico City in the middle of the presidential campaign and "a crowd filled the platforms of the San Lázaro station to receive them." The primary elections were held on 1 October 1911, and the secondary elections on the 15th. Madero "won the presidency of the Republic by quite a margin. The real fight was between the vice presidential candidates.." After close competition, Pino triumphed with 63.90% of the popular vote. On 2 November 1911, in accordance with the Constitution of 1854, the Congress of the Union met as an electoral college to certify the popular elections; the triumph of Madero and Pino was declared. For the vice presidency of the Republic, Pino obtained 10,254 votes against the 5,564 obtained by León de la Barra and 3,374 obtained by Vázquez Gómez. Three days later, the proclamation was published that recognized the electoral triumph of Madero and Pino, who were to govern for a five-year period between 1911 and 1916.

Candidate	Votes	%
José María Pino Suárez	10,245	63.90
Francisco León de la Barra	5,564	34.70
Fernando Iglesias Calderón	173	1.08
Other candidates	51	0.32
Total	16,033	100.00
Source: González Casanova

=== Vice-President of Mexico and Secretary of Education ===
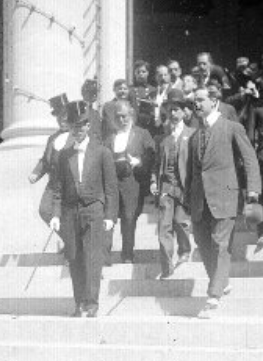
Vice-president Pino Suárez leaves Congress after swearing the oath of office in November 1911

On 18 November, Pino arrived in Mexico City by train. On the morning of 23 November, in the plenary session of the Chamber of Deputies and before its president, Manuel Levy, he swore the oath of office. The newspapers of the time reported that Pino "was moved to such a degree that he changed some of the terms of the oath." After the act, he was escorted by two mounted gendarmerie regiments to the National Palace where President Madero, accompanied by his Ministers, received the vice-president to whom he said the following words:

"You have just sworn to protect and preserve the Constitution and I know, because I know you well, that your oath is sincere and you will comply with it. The triumph of your candidacy is a guarantee for the future, because it demonstrates the intelligence, and patriotism of the Mexican people who, with the manifest intention of helping me in the arduous task imposed on me have put by my side, to collaborate with me, and, if necessary to replace me, a man of your energy, which you will use to defend the interests of the people. In Ciudad Juárez, you said at a certain moment: 'How is it possible that we abandon a man who has rendered such eminent services to the Republic at this difficult moment? It is possible that he will sink and go to an abyss, but it is our duty to accompany him, because such determination is only inspired by the purest love of the country!' As luck would have it, instead of accompanying me to the abyss, you accompany me to the highest position our Nation can offer.”

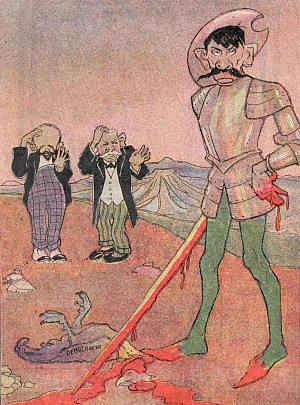
Caricature of Zapata and Madero.

A few days after Pino assumed office, Emiliano Zapata, a radical revolutionary, published the Plan of Ayala, planning to topple the Madero's government and accusing him of having made "of the ideal of democratic elections a bloody mockery of the people and imposing, against the will of the same said people, José María Pino Suárez in the Vice Presidency of the Republic."

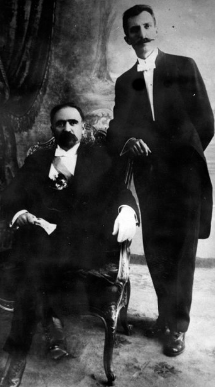
Portrait of President Francisco I. Madero and Vice-president José María Pino Suárez

Madero had publicly pronounced himself in favor of naming Pino Suárez concurrently Vice President of the Republic and Secretary of the Interior. However, in Madero's first government, Pino Suárez did not occupy any ministerial portfolio, which led the historian José C. Valdés to affirm that at that time his "political influence was limited."

Madero's first government was beset by many problems: "The cabinet was formed with a conservative majority and a revolutionary minority. This situation generated serious problems in the administration, since all attempts at reform were hampered by conservative ministers supported by some members of the bourgeoisie, such as Madero's own father, and by the reactionary sector of the press, whose attacks were terribly virulent."

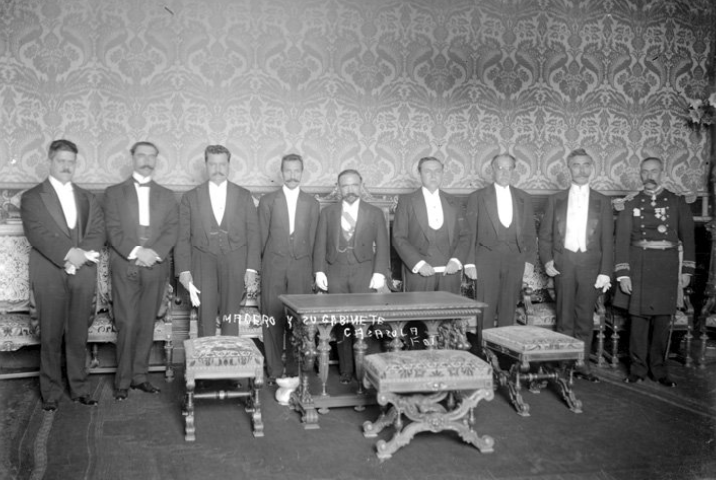
Madero's second government lasted between 1912 and 1913. After the February 1912 reshuffle, Pino Suárez became Secretary of Education and his influence in the administration grew significantly, even being described as "dominant"

On 26 February 1912, President Madero inaugurated his second government, and Pino's political influence grew significantly as a result. Among the significant changes in the cabinet reshuffle, Abraham González Casavantes resigned from the Ministry of the Interior to take over as Governor of Chihuahua, being replaced in office by Jesús Flores Magón. Meanwhile, Pino was asked to lead the Ministry of Education and Fine Arts, replacing Miguel Díaz Lombardo, who would be appointed Ambassador to France.

Pino's appointment as Secretary of Education was important as education was one of the key pillars of the Maderista revolution: Madero desired to remove the last vestiges of the old regime's ideology from national education. Madero "began to show its sympathies for popular education and not only for the dissemination of culture to the circles of the intellectual elite as had been done hitherto."

On 9 April, Manuel Calero y Sierra resigned from the Foreign Ministry to become Ambassador in the United States, being replaced in office by Pedro Lascuráin. Calero's posting in Washington was brief: in December he was forced to resign due to an embarrassing scandal: the Ambassador was advising US companies to evade new taxes imposed by the Madero administration. After resigning, he accused that "the influence of Vice-President Pino Suárez has become dominant in the administration."

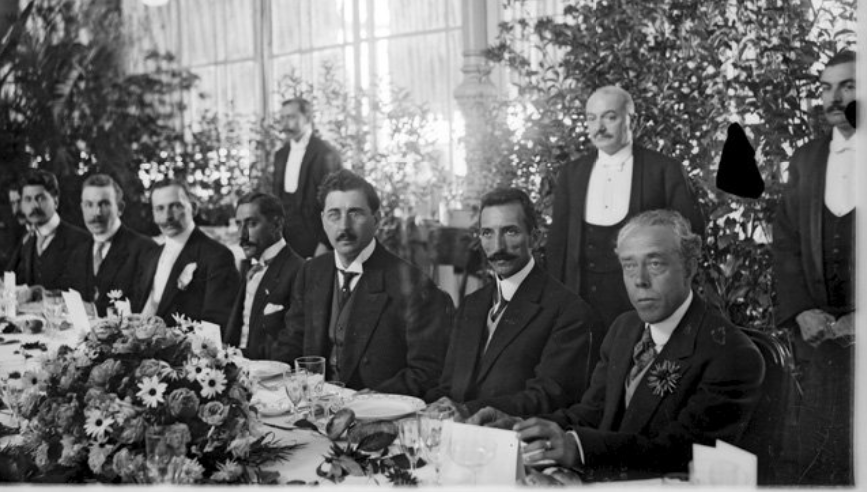
Pino Suárez dining with politicians of the Bloque Renovador. To his right is Gustavo Madero who headed the Renovador movement in Congress.

Madero's second government soon faced several uprisings in the context of the Mexican Revolution: the Bernardo Reyes rebellion, the Orozquista revolution, the growth of Zapatismo in Morelos, and finally the Félix Díaz uprising in Veracruz. All of these uprising were quashed by the government.

Within the cabinet, Pino Suárez headed the liberal wing of the Maderista party (known as bloque renovador) that sought to return to the liberal and democratic values that Madero had favored before assuming power and for which it had been necessary to overthrow the dictator:

"Characters of all political affiliations paraded through Madero's cabinet, each with more or less determined ideologies; the cabinet strived to amalgamate the highest representatives of Mexican society, economy and politics, an objective which was difficult to achieve if not altogether contradictory. Maderismo, independent of Madero but loyal to Madero, although sometimes having to act against Madero, stuck for an idea of exclusivism which the government at times accepted and at times rejected: in some Ministries it acted in a conciliatory manner; in others, it was tenacious and intolerant to a civil service which remained loyal to the old regime. Pino Suárez headed the Renovador movement, a group of Ministers who wanted the government to be exclusive to revolutionaries and which strived to return the government to base its support on the people who had elected it."

In the legislative elections held in February 1912, the Renovador movement, headed in Congress by Gustavo Madero, obtained a slim legislative majority. However, the opposition against the government was better organized, effectively "exaggerating the badness of the situation in the country, hindering the action of the Executive branch and launching harsh attacks against the government... with their activities they were undermining the prestige of Madero, whom they branded as inept and naïve."

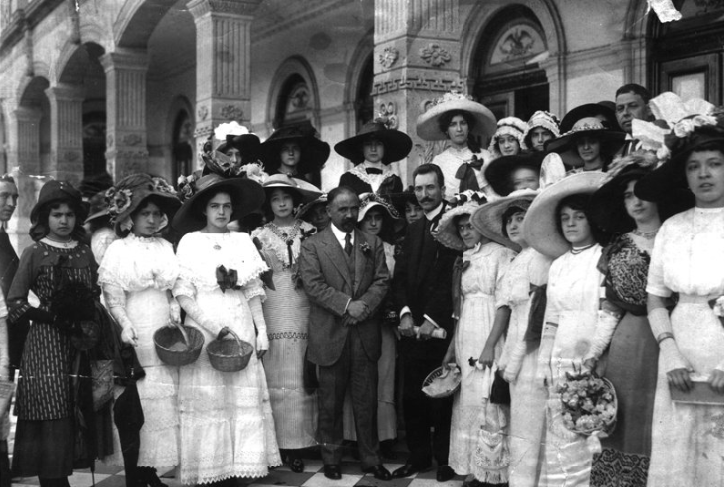
President Madero and Vice-president Pino Suárez receiving at suffragettes the Chapultepec Castle, then the Presidential Residence.

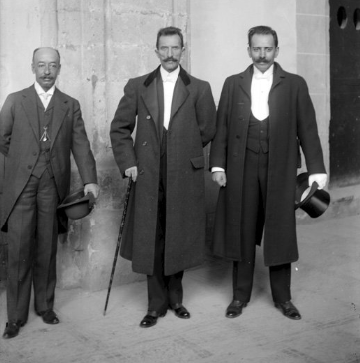
J.M. Pino Suárez (center) is photographed at the Ministry of Education with Miguel Díaz Lombardo, the outgoing Secretary of Education, (left) and Alberto J. Pani, the Undersecretary (right)

However, the most virulent attacks were always reserved for Pino who was immensely unpopular with the opposition in Congress. Manuel Márquez Sterling, the Cuban Ambassador to Mexico at the time, described it:

"If the attacks on [Madero] were violent…the opposition to Pino Suárez was even more so. Daily, he was radicalized and the opposition attributed to his person defects which he did not possess [...] And as if fate made of the vice presidency in all forms of government a target of insatiable anger, Pino Suárez could match the headaches he suffered to those of his late predecessor [Vice President Ramón Corral]. Stuck between Madero [...] and his adversaries, on both sides of the political aisle, who were out to crucify him [...] he waited patiently for the discomforts and blows to tilt [Madero's] vacillating policy to his side and that of his party. After a delicious banquet offered by Madero to the Diplomatic corps, Pino Suárez, smoking a delicious cuban cigar from Vuelta Abajo and with a glass of Chartreuse between his fingers, explained to me, in an intimate tone, his criteria, and I remember, as if I was just hearing them now, his words, full of faith. "We find ourselves – he said – in a very critical situation; and only a change of methods will be able to avoid total catastrophe; the change is already planned and the government will manage to move away from the precipice. An energetic hand, a determined, concrete, invariable political leadership, is what the extremely altered state of the country requires. To go towards Don Porfirio's accomplices is to put one's throat under the executioner's axe. And that is exactly where we are today. I do not recommend carrying out persecutions, abuses, or evil. I maintain my allegiance to the ideal of the Plan of San Luis Potosí, which is a tribute to legality, freedom and civilization. But the policy of rapprochement with the oligarch, who hates us, will only throw us into the abyss. At the moment we are not exactly a Cíentifico [technocratic] government, but we are not a populist government either. And that is the cause of the riots and the origin of our dejection. We are caught between two fires. We are not anyone's adversaries; but the whole world is our adversary. The president already sees things clearly in this matter on which the life of the government and perhaps our own life depends. As long as we maintain the support of Congress and the people, we do not need the fat cats."

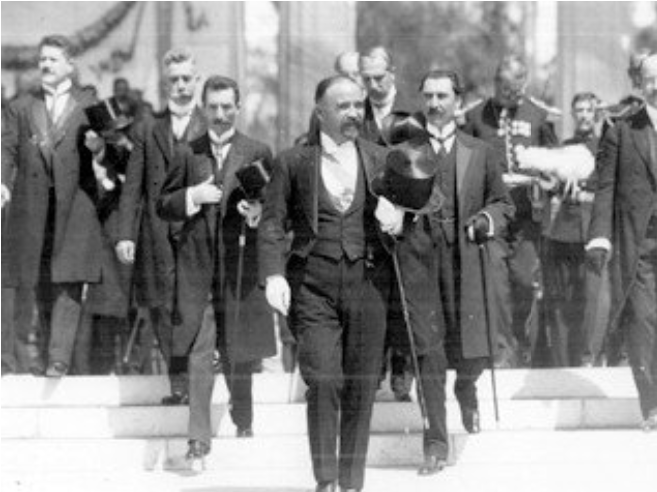
Madero and Pino Suárez in the last public event which they attended shortly before their assassination.

At the head of the Ministry of Education, Pino decided that he would favor "elementary and popular education" and, in accordance with the wishes of President Madero, he wanted to eliminate the last vestiges of positivism, an ideology that had been favored by the Cíentificos, a group of technocrats who had advised Porfirio Díaz. In the context of the Separation of church and state, the former ministers of Díaz had favored a secular education with a positivist ideology as opposed to naturalism, the ideology that had been favored by Catholic Church, historically predominant in the country's education. The Cíentificos, however, "due to the triumph of the revolutionary movement of 1910…had lost almost all of their political positions; the National School of Jurisprudence was one of the few important ones – as a source of supply for political “cadres" – that remained in their hands, and they decided to fight a head-to-head battle before losing it"

To end the control that the former regime had over the National School of Jurisprudence, Pino appointed Luis Cabrera as its director, an appointment that was greeted dismissively by the law students. Differences between the Ministry and law students led to the founding of the Escuela Libre de Derecho as a private university. Once the Maderista regime was overthrown in 1913, several professors from this new institution were ministers in the de facto government headed by General Victoriano Huerta, and many students celebrated the change of regime.

In January 1913, only months before the coup d'état, "the Congressmen belonging to the Renovador party opted for conferring with the President in order to make him aware of the danger that surrounded his government and to recommend that he restructure his cabinet, naming revolutionaries with a proven track record of loyalty to the government. Headed by José Inés Novelo [formerly Pino's private secretary], the Congressmen met with the President on January 25th, 1913, but Madero rejected their proposals and ended the meeting abruptly."

=== The Ten Tragic Days: Military Coup d'État ===
By February 1913, Gustavo Madero had already been appointed Ambassador to Japan, although he had not yet left for Tokyo. His separation from the government was "a good guarantee, hidden in a valise diplomatique, of his discrepancies [with the President]." For similar reasons, Pino, "in his heart of hearts, longed to resign and it was a point that he often discussed in hermetic privacy." Luis Cabrera, always close to Pino Suárez, "foreseeing the earthquake which would sink the government" decided to go abroad, to Europe.

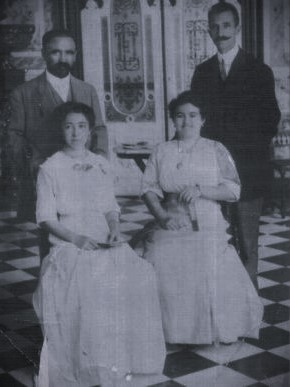
The Madero and Pino-Cámara families photographed at the Chapultepec Castle, then the presidential residence.

Pino was perhaps the first member of Madero's cabinet to question the loyalty of General Victoriano Huerta, who still kept the outward appearance of serving the Madero government:

"One afternoon, shortly before, Huerta announced himself at Pino Suárez's house. The butler ushered him into the living room; and the Vice-President believed that Huerta's objective was to arrest him. He was greatly astonished when Huerta, hugging him, said: 'Mr. Pino Suárez: my enemies affirm that I am going to carry out a coup d'état. Now, here I am to reiterate my adherence to the government'."

On 9 February, when the coup that would cost them their lives broke out, Pino Suárez immediately informed Federico González Garza, Governor of the Federal District, of the military uprising, who in turn informed Emiliano López Figueroa, Chief-Inspector of the Federal Police. Later, Pino Suárez and González Garza headed towards the National Palace, the official seat of the executive branch, which was already being besieged by the rebels.

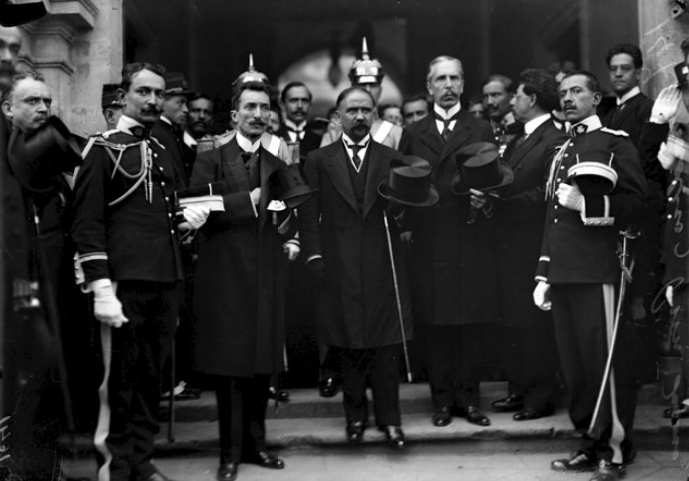
Madero and Pino Suárez portrayed with the Porfirista Army which eventually would betray them. To Madero's left is Pedro Lascurain, the Foreign Secretary.

That same day, after inspecting the battle that had broken out in National Palace, Pino Suárez and González Garza went to the Chapultepec Castle, the presidential residence, to inform President Madero of the events that were developing in the city center. The National Palace had been successfully protected by General Lauro Villar, who remained loyal to the government. González Garza organized a company of cadets and gendarmes to protect the President and vice-president as they made their way from Chapultepec Castle to the National Palace, in a route that is remembered in Mexican history as la marcha de la lealtad (the march of loyalty). Modern-day Mexican presidents have continued to celebrate this historic event, retracing the steps of Madero's march. As they made their way through the city center, the military column, led by the President, riding on horseback, was fired upon by a sniper. The President and his entourage had to stop, seeking shelter at a daguerre photograph shop where they were joined by Gustavo Madero and, some time later, by General Victoriano Huerta. There, Madero was informed that General Villar had been wounded during combat and, at the request of Ángel García Peña, Secretary of Defense, it was decided to appoint General Huerta to replace him as the military commander in charge of ending the insurrection.

After the failure of the rebels to take the National Palace, the rebels had to retreat to La Ciudadela, a fortress and armaments depot in the historic center of Mexico City. Victoriano Huerta, who had secretly reached an agreement with the rebels to assume the interim presidency once President Madero fell, pretended to remain loyal to the government. Nevertheless, his ammunition was fired in such a way as to cause minimum damage to La Ciudadela, ensuring that the fortress did not fall in government hands, and causing maximum damage to other buildings, particularly occupied by foreign residents, to convince the foreign diplomatic missions of the inefficiency of the Madero Government. As Pino before him, Gustavo Madero question that General Huerta, who had previously been recognized throughout his career for his talent in employing artillery, would now display such ineptitude. On 17 February, Gustavo Madero decided to arrest General Huerta and presented him to his brother, accusing him of treason. President Madero, in a mistake that would cost him his life, decided to free General Huerta, giving him a 24-hour deadline to capture La Ciudadela.

Prior to this, Madero had already travelled to Cuernavaca to enlist the support of the army headed by Felipe Ángeles, a capable and respected general who had remained loyal to the government and who was successfully quenching the Zapata rebellion in the State of Morelos. In case Huerta failed to meet the President's deadline, he would be replaced by Ángeles.

A contemporary caricature shows General Victoriano Huerta as the assassin of Madero and Pino, their two skulls hanging from his neck.

The following day, 18 February, while the Cabinet was meeting in the National Palace, rebel troops led by Colonel Teodoro Jiménez Riveroll broke into the session and tried to arrest the President, vice-president and the entire Cabinet. The secret service protected the President, and one of its officers, Captain Gustavo Garmendia, managed to kill Colonel Jiménez Riveroll, frustrating that attempt to overthrow the Madero government. A small delegation headed by President Madero and Vice President Pino Suárez intended to go to the courtyard of the National Palace to enlist the support of loyal troops. The military personnel stationed there, however, stood by while General Aureliano Blanquet arrested their commander in chief. Madero and Pino Suárez, now prisoners of the rebel forces, were taken to the offices of the quartermaster of the National Palace. There, they were imprisoned together with Felipe Ángeles. As these events were developing in the National Palace, Huerta had invited Gustavo Madero to a luncheon at Gambrinus, an elegant restaurant in the city center, ostensibly to smooth their misunderstandings and give him a full report of the military advances. There, Gustavo was arrested, brutally tortured by the rebel army and, subsequently assassinated.

Pedro Lascuráin, the Foreign Secretary, acted as an intermediary between the Madero government and the rebels led by General Huerta. Lascuráin conveyed Huerta's offer to Madero and Pino Suárez: if both men resigned from their respective positions, he would grant them safe conduct to travel to the port of Veracruz, from where he would allow them to embark to the foreign country of their choice. Madero and Pino Suárez agreed to present their respective resignations, but they established several conditions, among them, they demanded that Lascuráin not submit the double resignation to Congress until Madero, together with his brother Gustavo (they still did not know of his tragic end), Pino Suárez and Ángeles, had embarked with their respective families on a warship that had been provided by the government of Cuba. When drafting the resignation documents, Pino Suárez "haughtily stated that he was not satisfied with the reason given as the cause of the resignations and wanted it to be recorded that they were forced to do so by the force of arms," it was only after hectic negotiations with the vice-president, that it was decided that the resignation should contain the phrase "compelled by circumstances."

What have I done that they should want to kill me? Politics has only provided me with anguish, pain, and disappointment. Believe me when I say that I have only been motivated by a desire to do good. But the fashionable way to conduct politics is through intrigue, falseness, and profit. Mr. Madero and I have not carried out politics in this fashion. We respected the lives and the convictions of our fellow citizens, we complied with the law, and we exalted democracy which we found in ruins. Is it just that they arouse such a blind enemy and lead to the scaffold two honest men who did not hate, did not intrigue, did not deceive and did not profit?

— José María Pino Suárez

Disobeying the orders of the President who had instructed him to keep the resignations until such time as he knew the men were safely aboard the Cuban Warship, Lascuráin immediately traveled to the Chamber of Deputies, where he presented the resignations to the Speaker. The Speaker convened an extraordinary session, so that the Federal Deputies could vote on accepting the resignations. General Huerta took the precaution of surrounding the Congress building with armed troops. A majority of the Chamber voted to accept both resignations in the belief that this would save the lives of Madero and Pino. In the Presidential Line of Succession, the Foreign Secretary would become president if the vice-president was unable to succeed the President. Therefore, Lascuráin was sworn in as interim President. Lascuráin served for forty-five minutes, sufficient time to name Victoriano Huerta as Minister of the Interior and to present his own resignation. After Lascuráin's resignation was accepted by the Chamber, Huert was asked to take his place. As Interior Minister, he was the next in line to the presidency.

Despite several efforts made by various members of the diplomatic corps accredited in Mexico and the families of both men, the new de facto government headed by Victoriano Huerta never allowed them to go into exile.

=== Assassination ===
On the night of 22 February, Madero and Pino Suárez were taken from the National Palace, where they were being held captive, to be transferred in two vehicles to Lecumberri Prison. Ostensibly, this would be a safe site to detain the two men while the government decided their fate.

When they arrived at Lecumberri, the cars passed the main entrance, turning towards the farthest end of the compound. There, Francisco Cárdenas, a corporal in the Rurales, ordered Madero to get out of the car and, given his refusal to comply, shot him in the head, killing him instantly. Following this act, Lieutenant Rafael Pimienta shot Pino Suárez, whose body registered a total of thirteen bullet shots.

The assassination was carried out by express order of General Huerta and his cabinet. The Huerta government explained, however, that a group of supporters had attempted to rescue the former president and vice-president and that both men had been shot while trying to escape. Francisco León de la Barra, the Foreign Secretary, sent a diplomatic cable with this version of events, which "circulated through all the foreign ministries of the world [...] describing, in a tone worthy a novel, this sensational version of the events... In Mexico, where the Ley Fuga [killing someone who escapes] has been applied too many times [as an excuse for assassinating your enemies] [...] nobody, supporter or opponent of the government, believed the official fable."

In the United States, "public opinion was so shaken that it was impossible for President William Howard Taft to recognize the Huerta government." His successor, Woodrow Wilson, had sympathized with Madero and would support the constitutionalist forces of Venustiano Carranza who would succeed in overthrowing the Huerta dictatorship in August 1914. Huerta's military dictatorship had de facto recognition from some European governments, including Great Britain. as well as China and Japan. On the other hand, the United States and Latin American countries (with the exception of Guatemala) avoided granting recognition. Eventually, Woodrow Wilson, was able to convince the British government to change their attitude towards Huerta.

María Cámara Vales, Pino's widow, wanted to go to identify her husband's body, but was convinced by family and friends that she would not "suffer the torture of seeing him." But it was Alfredo Pino Cámara, his eldest son, then only a fourteen-year-old teenager, who "examined with horror the swollen features of his father and the strip of cardboard, bound by a bandage, that held the dismembered skull together."

== Legacy ==
In 1969, shortly before her death, Maria Cámara Vales, his widow, was awarded the prestigious Belisario Domínguez Medal of Honor by the Mexican Senate, an accolade granted to individuals who have significantly contributed to the country's civic values and national progress. This recognition, one of the highest civilian honors in Mexico, underscored the enduring legacy of both Maria Cámara and José María Pino Suárez as a symbol of courage and resilience during one of the nation's most tumultuous periods.

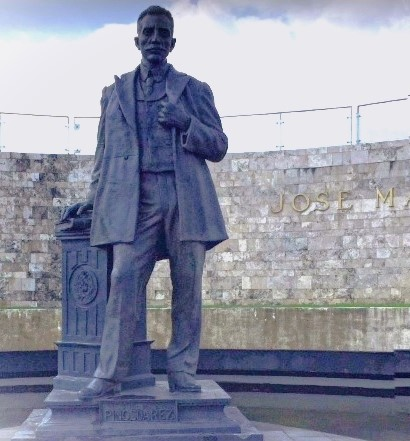
Monument to José María Pino Suárez in Villahermosa, Tabasco

In 1986, President Miguel de la Madrid ordered the remains of José María Pino Suárez be interred with full military honors at the Rotunda of Illustrious Persons, a site that honors those who are considered to have exalted the civic and national values of Mexico. Four years earlier, in 1982, De la Madrid had already expressed admiration for Pino Suárez in his work Political Thought, writing:

Pino Suárez is "The Loyal Gentleman," (Caballero de la Lealtad) exemplifying loyalty to Mexico and the Revolution—a quality that remains fully relevant as an indispensable virtue for public servants. Loyalty to the Revolution, loyalty to the interests of the people.

In 1915, the Congress of the State of Tabasco ordered that Pino's birthplace was to be renamed as Tenosique de Pino Suárez. In Villahermosa, the state capital of Tabasco, a statue was erected in his honor. Later, his name was written in golden letters in the assembly hall of the Congress of Tabasco.

In Mexico City and Villahermosa, public libraries bear his name. Similarly, in Mérida, the Yucatán State Archives (Hemeroteca del Estado José María Pino Suárez) is also named in his honor. Throughout Mexico, numerous public schools pay tribute to him; in Mexico City, alone, there are five.

Throughout the country, several cities have streets named in his honor near the city center. Pancho Villa decided that his memory should be honored in the historic center of Mexico City: on the morning of 8 December 1914, he declared that one of the main thoroughfares leading out of the Zócalo would be named for Pino Suárez; to this date, it remains as Pino Suárez Avenue (Avenida Pino Suárez), it is one of the most popular and historically significant streets in the city and was pedestrianised in 2009. The Supreme Court of Justice building is located in this street and is commonly known as Pino Suárez 2. A long-running television program which covers the judicial branch (canal judicial) is also called Pino Suárez Dos.

Metro Pino Suárez, one of the most important stations of the Mexico City Metro also bears his name.

Over the years, postage stamps and currency has been issued bearing his likeness. In 2010, on the 100th anniversary of the Mexican Revolution, the Central Bank of Mexico (Banco de México) ordered the minting of a five peso coin ($5.00) which bore the portrait of José María Pino Suárez. Similar coins were minted bearing the likeness of Francisco I. Madero, Álvaro Obregón, Venustiano Carranza, Pancho Villa, Emiliano Zapata and other important revolutionary leaders. In 2023, reports indicated that Pino Suárez coins were being sold for as much as 22,000 Mexican pesos—equivalent to over a thousand U.S. dollars.

In 1923, Plutarco Elías Calles, approved the project to build a monument to Madero and Pino Suárez in the Zócalo, the main square in central Mexico City. However, the plan was abandoned after it was criticized on aesthetic grounds. Instead, in 1938, the Monument to the Revolution (Monumento a La Revolución) was built and is now the site of the National Museum of the Revolution (Museo Nacional de la Revolución).

In 2013, to commemorate the 100th anniversary of his assassination, another statue was built on the site where Pino Suárez had been slained.

In 2020, to mark the 107th anniversary of the assassination of Francisco I. Madero and José María Pino Suárez, President Andrés Manuel López Obrador inaugurated a museum dedicated to their memory within the National Palace (Palacio Nacional). This museum was established at the very site where Madero, Pino Suárez, and General Felipe Ángeles were imprisoned following the 1913 coup, serving as a solemn reminder of their sacrifice and their fight for democracy in Mexico.

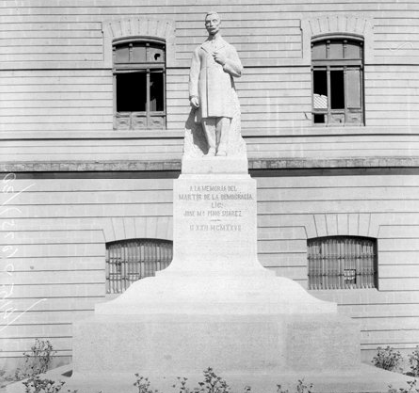
This Statue was erected in the site where José María Pino Suárez was assassinated. Pino Suárez is praised as the Martyr of Democracy.

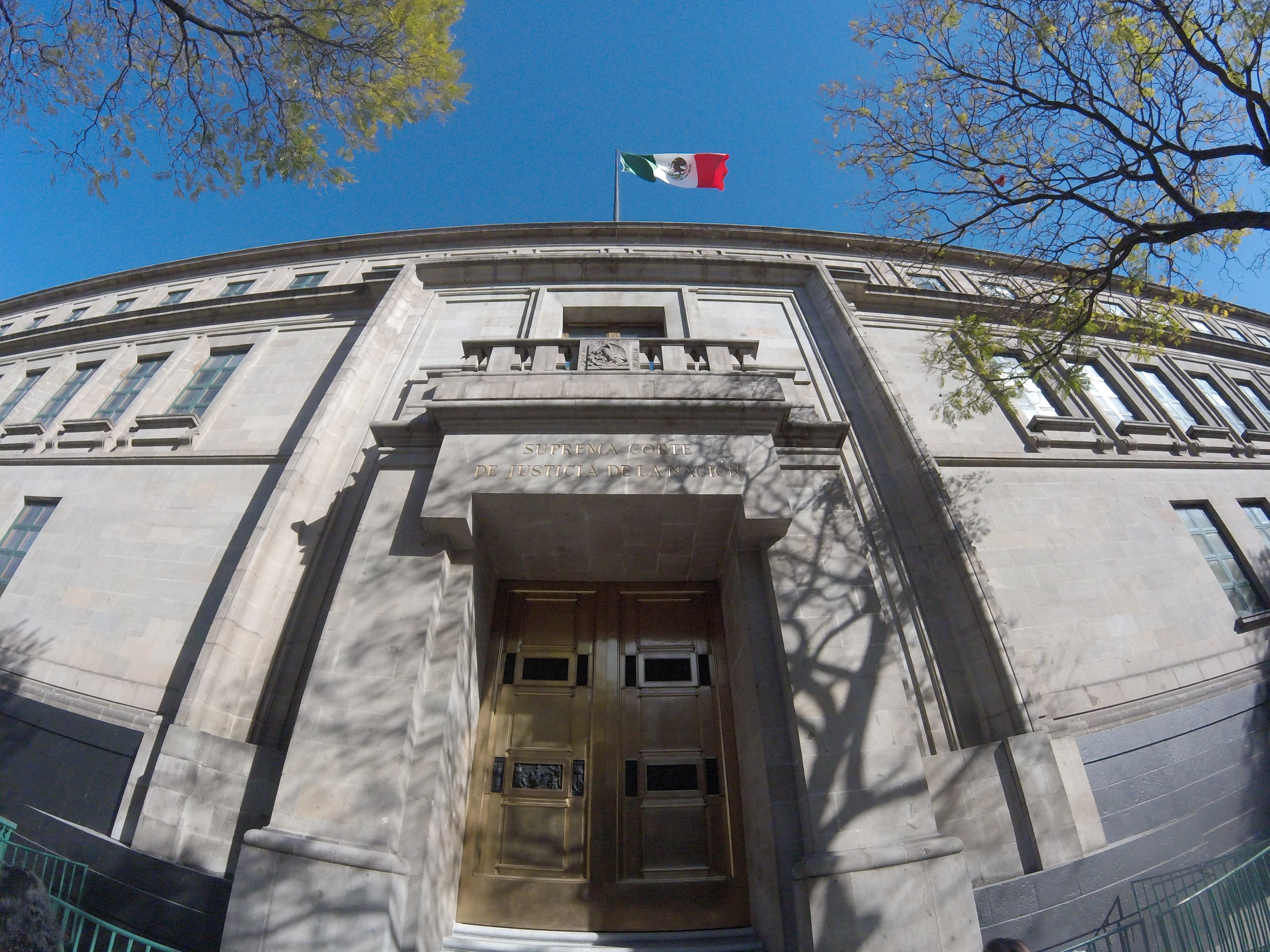
The Supreme Court of Justice building is located in Avenida Pino Suárez 2.

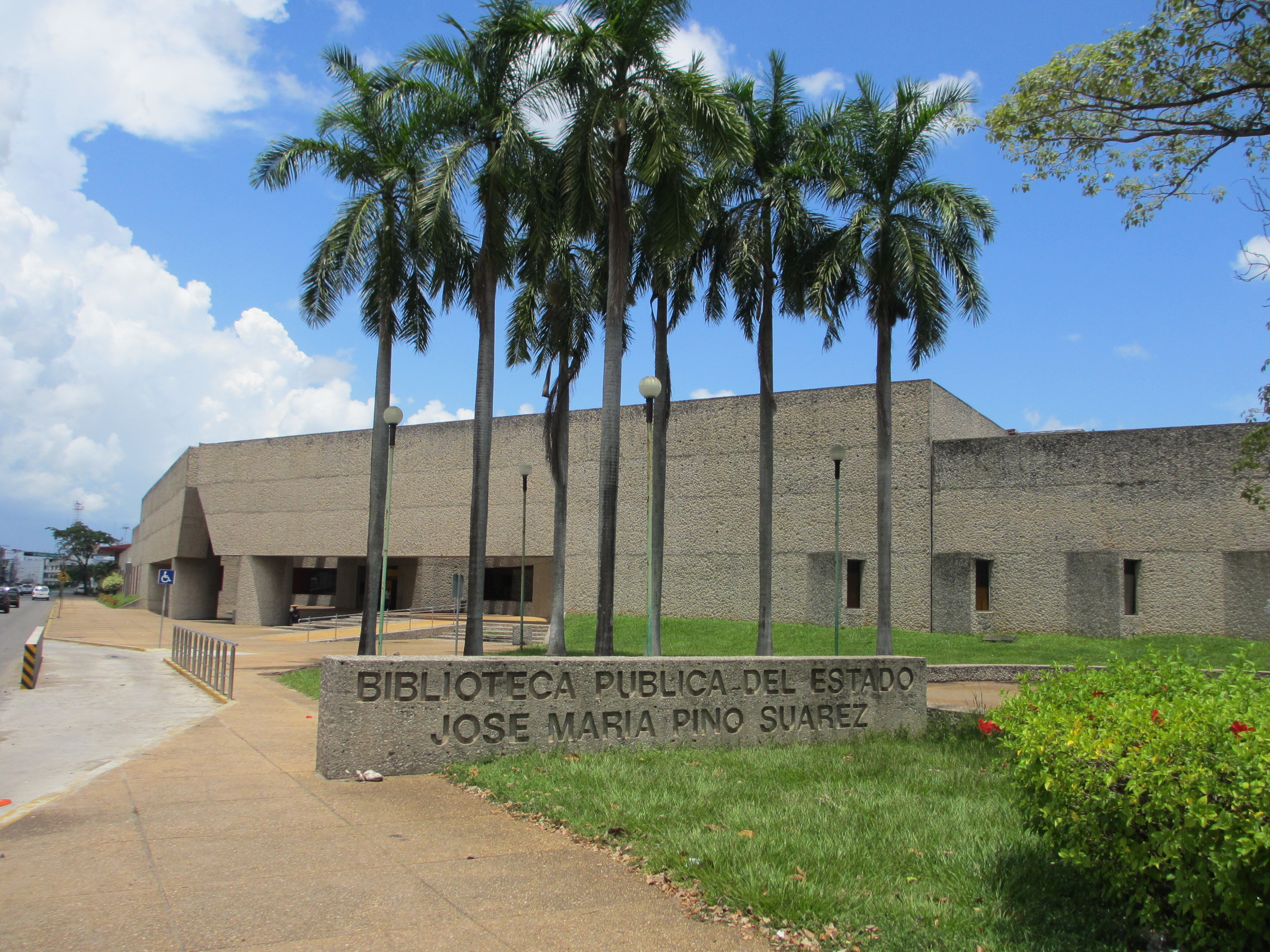
Pino Suárez Public library in Villahermosa, Tabasco.

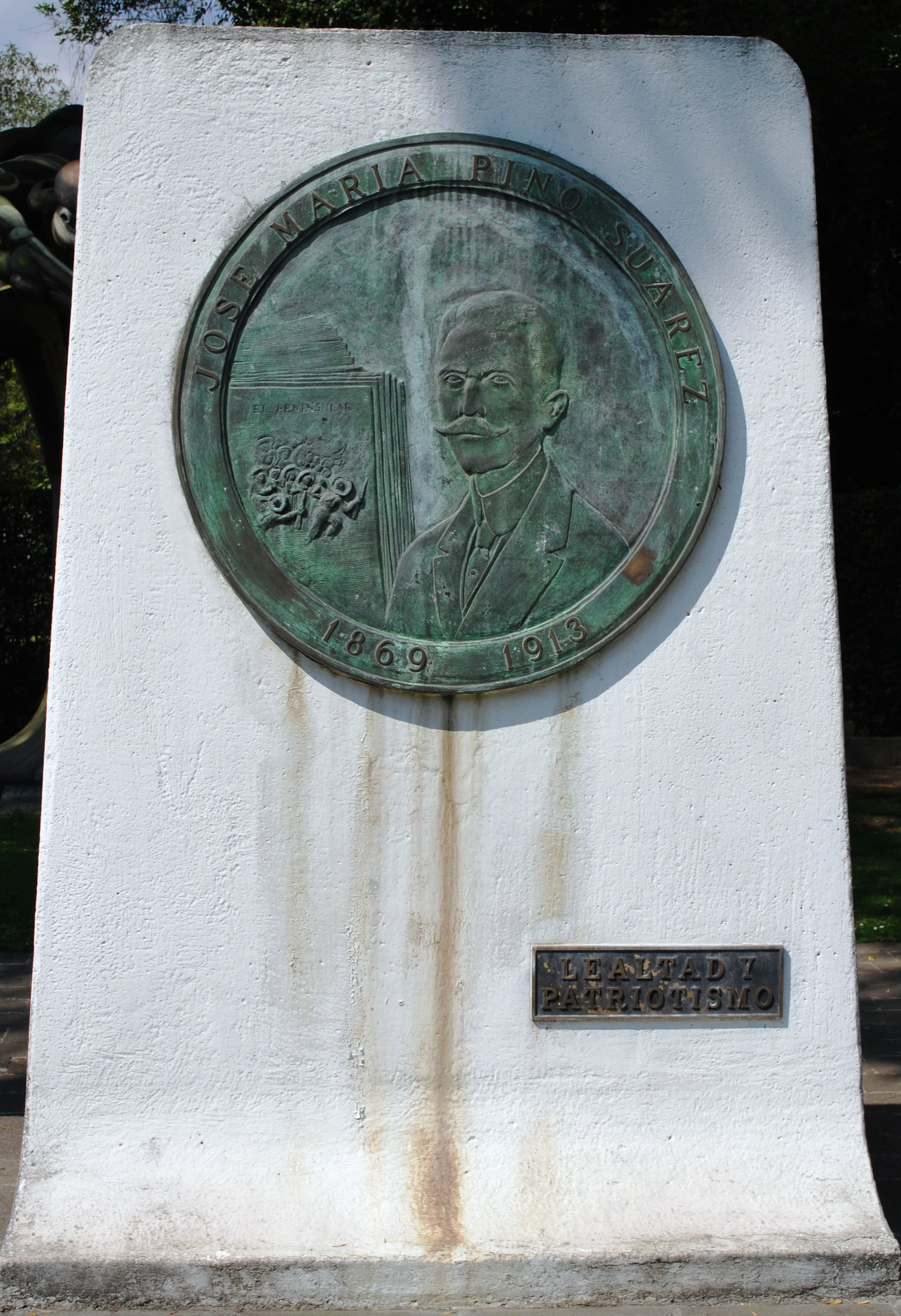
His tomb at the Rotonda de las Personas Ilustres.

== See also ==
- Liberalism in Mexico
- Mexican Revolution
- List of Vice Presidents of Mexico
- Ten Tragic Days

Political offices
Preceded by Ramón Corral	Vice President of Mexico; 1911–1913	Succeeded by Office abolished
