= Eligio =

Eligio is an Italian, Portuguese and Spanish given name. Notable people with the name include:

== Given names ==
- Eligio Ancona (1835–1893), Mexican politician
- Eligio Ayala (1879–1930), former president of Paraguay
- Eligio Caracciolo (1654–1700), Italian Roman Catholic prelate
- Eligio Cedeño (born 1964), Venezuelan banker
- Eligio Cervantes (born 1974), Mexican athlete
- Eligio Echagüe (1938–2009), Paraguayan footballer
- Eligio González Farías (born 1977), Mexican politician
- Eligio de la Garza II (1927–2017), American politician
- Eligio Insfrán (born 1935), Paraguayan footballer
- Eligio Lofranco (born 1943), Filipino lawyer
- Eligio Martínez (born 1955), Bolivian footballer
- Eligio Esquivel Méndez (1908–1964), Mexican politician and engineer
- Eligio Sardiñas Montalvo (1910–1988), Cuban boxer
- Eligio Perucca (1890–1965), Italian physics instructor and researcher
- Eligio Pichardo (1929–1984), painter from the Dominican Republic
- Eligio de la Puente (1724–1781), Spanish Floridian
- Eligio Valentino (1925–2012), Italian sprint canoer
- Eligio Vecchi (1910–1968), Italian footballer

== Middle names ==
- Luis Eligio Tapia (born 1950), American artist

== Churches ==
- Sant'Eligio dei Chiavettieri, a church in Naples, Italy
- Sant'Eligio Maggiore, a church in Naples, Italy
- Sant'Eligio degli Orefici, a church in Rome, Italy
