= Lioy =

Lioy is a surname. Notable people with the surname include:

- Paolo Lioy (1834–1911), Italian naturalist, redshirt patriot and politician
- Paul J. Lioy (1947–2015), United States environmental health scientist

== See also ==
- Loy
