= Caulfield Byrne Caulfield =

Irish Anglican priest

Caulfield Byrne Caulfield (14 January 1733 – 23 November 1803 was an Irish Anglican priest in the second half of the 18th century and the first three years of the 19th.

Byrne was educated at Trinity College, Dublin. He held livings at Derryloran; Rossory, Monaghan and Donaghmore. Caulfield was Archdeacon of Clogher from 1788 until his death.
