= Lofranco =

Lofranco is a surname. Notable people with the surname include:

- Eligio Lofranco (born 1943), Filipino lawyer
- Franco Lofranco (born 1969), Canadian soccer player
- Spencer Lofranco (1992–2025), Canadian actor
