= Loy (disambiguation) =

Loy is both a given name and a surname.

Loy may also refer to:

- Loy (gastropod), a genus of sea slugs within the superfamily Onchidoridoidea
- USS Loy (DE-160), a destroyer escort of the United States Navy
- Loy (spade), a type of spade once used for manual ploughing in Ireland

== See also ==
- De Loys's ape, an unconfirmed primate species now widely considered a misidentification or a hoax
- St Loy's Cove, a small bay in Cornwall, UK
