= Loye =

Loye is a surname. Notable people with this name include:

- Aleksandr Loye (born 1983), Russian actor
- David Elliot Loye (1925–2022), American author and psychologist
- Charles Auguste Loye, real name of George Montbard (1841–1905), French artist
- James Loye (born 1979), British actor
- Kate Loye (born 1993), New Zealand football player
- Loye H. Miller (1874–1970), American paleontologist
- Mal Loye (born 1972), English cricket player
- Paul Loye (1861–1890), French physician

== See also ==
- La Loye, France
- La Vieille-Loye, France
- Loye-sur-Arnon, France
- Louye, a commune in France
- Loy (disambiguation)
