= Derryloran =

Civil parish in County Tyrone, Northern Ireland

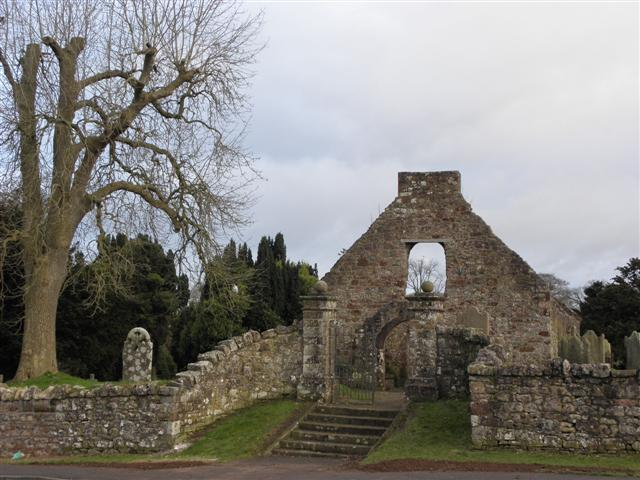
- Derryloran Old Church
- County: County Tyrone
- Country: Northern Ireland
- Sovereign state: United Kingdom
- Postcode district: BT
- Dialling code: 028

Derryloran is a civil parish mainly in County Tyrone, Northern Ireland, with some areas in County Londonderry. It is situated in the historic baronies of Dungannon Upper in County Tyrone and Loughinsholin in County Londonderry. It is also a townland (also known as Kirkstown) of 174 acres.

== Civil parish of Derryloran ==
The civil parish includes the town of Cookstown.

== Townlands ==
The civil parish contains the following townlands:

- Annahavil
- Ardcumber
- Ardvarnish
- Auglish
- Ballyforlea
- Ballygroogan
- Ballyloughan
- Ballymenagh
- Ballynasollus
- Ballyreagh
- Ballysudden
- Claggan
- Clare
- Cloghog
- Cluntydoon
- Cookstown
- Coolkeeghan
- Coolnafranky
- Coolnahavil
- Coolreaghs
- Craigs
- Cranfield
- Derrycrummy
- Derryloran (also known as Kirkstown)
- Doorless
- Drumard
- Drumcraw
- Drumearn
- Drumgarrell
- Drummond
- Drumrot
- Dunman
- Feegarran
- Gallanagh
- Glebe
- Gortalowry
- Gortin
- Gortreagh
- Kilcronagh
- Killybearn
- Killycurragh
- Killymam
- Killymoon Demesne
- Kirkstown (also known as Derryloran)
- Knockacunny
- Loughry
- Loughry Demesne
- Loy
- Maloon
- Monrush
- Moveagh
- New Buildings
- Rockhead
- Scotchtown
- Strifehill
- Sullenboy
- Tamlaghtmore
- Terressan
- Toberlane
- Tullagh
- Tullyboy
- Tullycall
- Tullygare
- Tullywiggan

== See also ==
- List of townlands in County Tyrone
- List of civil parishes of County Tyrone
