= Tullywiggan =

Village in County Tyrone, Northern Ireland

Coordinates: 54.620°N 6.737°W

Tullywiggan: Irish: Tulach an Bhogain
- Location within Northern Ireland
- District: Cookstown
- County: Tyrone
- Country: Northern Ireland
- Sovereign state: United Kingdom
- Postcode district: BT80
- Dialling code: 028
- Police: Northern Ireland
- Fire: Northern Ireland
- Ambulance: Northern Ireland
- UK Parliament: Mid-Ulster

Tullywiggan (possibly from Irish Tulach an Bhogain 'hillock of the quagmire') is a small village outside Cookstown, County Tyrone, Northern Ireland. It lies within the civil parish of Derryloran, the historic barony of Dungannon Upper, and is situated within Cookstown District Council.

Excavations have shown signs of a New Stone Age and early Bronze Age settlement.

== See also ==
- List of villages in Northern Ireland
- List of towns in Northern Ireland
