= Raúl Carrancá y Trujillo =

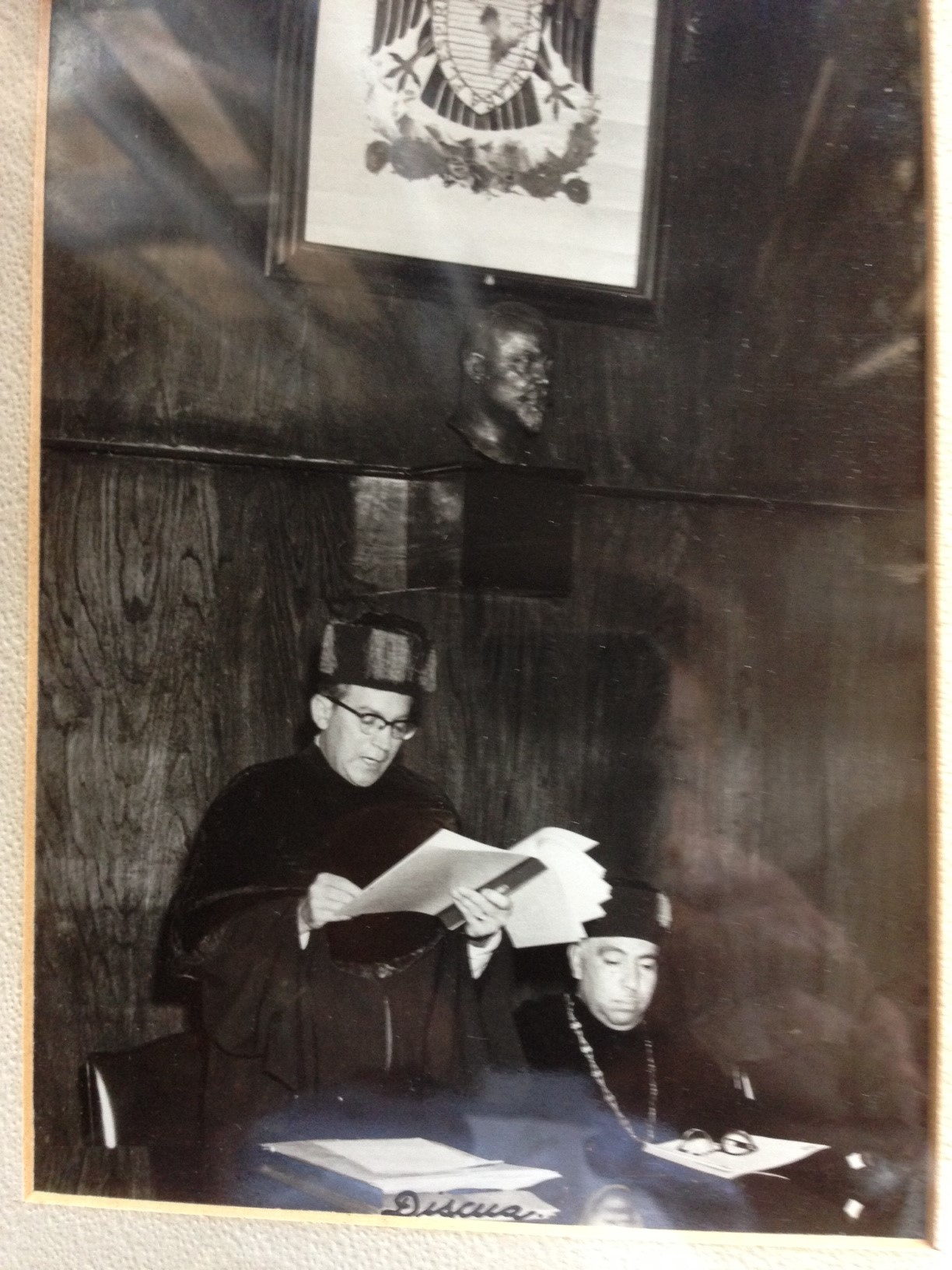

Raúl Carrancá y Trujillo (1897-1968) was a Mexican Chief Justice and legal academic.

== Biography ==
He held a Doctor of Law from both the Complutense University of Madrid and the National Autonomous University of Mexico (NAUM). He was born in the city of Campeche in 1897. His childhood was spent in the city of MéridaIn 1918 he was part of a group of students who received scholarships Mérida's career to study law at the University of Madrid, an institution where he received his doctorate in 1925.

On his return to Mexico he moved to Mexico City, where he began his academic career as professor of the Faculty of Law at the NAUM, mainly as a professor in the area of Criminal Law and the Faculty of Economics. Some of the academic positions he held at UNAM were: first director of the Faculty of Political and Social Sciences, director of the Institute of Legal Research (after Institute of Comparative Law) and NAUM'S General Secretary. In the area of administration of justice was criminal Judge, Criminal Court Magistrate and President of H. Superior Court of Justice of the Federal District and Federal Territories. Among the cases he was responsible especially emphasized being celebrated Thurs criminal proceedings conducted Ramón Mercader, alias Jacques Monard, as the murderer of Leon Trotsky. Meanwhile, as Chief Justice, noted for having launched by 1944 the "judicial tenure" in the civil courts. He was fellow and vice president of the Mexican Academy of Criminal Science and Counsel for the presidency. In addition, the French government named him Chevalier of the Legion of Honor. He died in 1968.

== The Case of Ramón Mercader ==
On August 20, 1940, Carrancá was assigned to the case of the criminal Ramón Mercader, alias Jacques Monard, accused of the crime of Leon Trotsky. At his trial, Mercader claimed to be a “disillusioned Trotskyist”. However, the police and international media suspect that the assassination was ordered by Stalin. Carrancá decides to use the tools of psychoanalysis to question Mercader's unconscious and discover his “true” motives. Thus, during his incarceration, Mercader underwent an intensive program that included psychoanalysis and more traditional psychological tests. For six months, doctors met with him six hours a day, six days a week, spending a total of 942 hours with him. According to Leon Trotsky's biographer, “no psychological study of a political assassin of comparable magnitude has ever been made”.

The doctors associated with the trial concluded that Mercader had developed a very active Oedipus complex in his childhood, which led him to feel a violent hatred for his father and for father figures in general - a murderous impulse ultimately directed against Leon Trotsky. In the end, it was on the grounds of an “active Oedipus complex” that Mercader was convicted. By this stage, Carrancá had been withdrawn from the trial for several months.

== Works ==
He authored a number of works in the legal and literary, among which are:

1925: Political developments in Latin America, Foreword by Rafael Altamira, Madrid, Ediciones Reus.

1928: The salary, Mexico, Federal District Government.

1932: Ordinances Guild of New Spain, Mexico, overshoot of Crucible. The substance of the Spanish Constitution, Mexico, overshoot of Crucible. Perez (novel), Mexico, Editorial Chart.

1933: The legitimate defense of honor (in collaboration with several), Mexico, Union of Lawyers of Mexico City Press. Prints of the people, Mexico.

1933-1966: Criminal work, Mexico, Criminalia.

1934: Suspended sentences and fines, Mexico, overshoot of Annals of Jurisprudence.

1935: The Criminal Amend au Mexique des Lois (Extrait d'oeuvres et d'essais), (in collaboration with José Angel Ceniceros, Alfonso Teja Zabre, Luis Garrido and Francisco Gonzalez de la Vega), Mexico, Ministry of Foreign Affairs.

1937-2012: Mexican Criminal Law, General Part, [First Edition, July 1937, Second Edition, December 1941, Third Edition, June 1950, Fourth Edition, April 1955, Fifth Edition, December 1958, Sixth Edition, April 1962; Seventh Edition, February 1965, Eighth Edition, April 1967. From the ninth edition, February 1970, coauthored with Raul Rivas Carrancá and, Tenth Edition, February 1971, Eleventh Edition, January 1976, Twelfth Edition, June 1977, Thirteenth Edition, April 1980 Fourteenth Edition, April 1982, Fifteenth Edition, 1986, Sixteenth edition, 1988, Seventeenth Edition, 1991, Eighteenth Edition, 1995, Nineteenth Edition, 1997, Twentieth Edition, 1999, Twenty-first edition, 2001, Twenty-second edition, 2003, Twenty-Third Edition, 2007, revised, updated, added indexes and doctrinally and legal texts], Porrúa, Mexico.

1938: The Literary Institute of Yucatán, Mexico, Yucatán Center Editions. Storia del Diritto Penale messicano, trans. Tancredi Prof. Gatti, Citta di Castello, edit. Typesetting Societá "Leonardo da Vinci." Comrades! (Novel), Mexico, Editorial Botas.

1941: Americanism and democracy, Mexico, Editorial Botas.

1943: The unification of Mexican criminal law, Mexico, Journal Criminalia. Response to Dr. Luis Jimenez Asúa in income to the Mexican Academy of Criminal Science, Mexico, Journal Criminalia.

1944: The causes that exclude incrimination, Mexico, Mexican and foreign law. Parapet (Prosas inconsequential), Mexico. Criminal Justice Theory Mexican, Mexico, Editorial Department of the Federal District.

1948: Outline of our America, Mexico, Ateneo editions of Science and Arts of Mexico.

1950: Social role of the lawyer, Mexico, National Autonomous University of Mexico (Conferences career guidance). Critical overview of our America, Mexico, University Press.

1951: University highlights of Mexico, Mexico, University Press.

1955: Principles of Criminal Sociology and Criminal Law, Mexico, University Press.

1961: Dogmatic interpretation of the definition of crime in Mexican criminal law, Mexico, Journal Criminalia. Methods and techniques used in the preparation of the criminal judgment, Mexico, Journal Criminalia. The administration of justice, Mexico, Journal Criminalia.

1962: Criminal Code Annotated, [First edition, 1962, Second Edition, 1966. From the third edition, 1971, coauthored with Raul Carrancá and Rivas Fourth edition, 1972, Fifth edition, 1974, Sixth Edition, 1976, Seventh Edition, 1978, Eighth Edition, 1980, Ninth Edition, 1981, Tenth Edition,1983, Eleventh Edition, 1985, Twelfth Edition, 1986, Thirteenth Edition, 1987, Fourteenth Edition, 1989, Fifteenth Edition, 1990, Sixteenth edition, 1991, Seventeenth Edition, 1993, Eighteenth Edition, 1995, Nineteenth Edition, 1995, Twentieth Edition, 1997, Twenty-first edition, 1998, Twenty-second edition, 1999, Twenty-Third Edition, 2000, Twenty-fourth edition, 2001, Twenty-fifth edition, 2003, Twenty-sixth edition, 2007, corrected, enlarged and updated, with commentaries and concordances, common law and federal Mexican and foreign comparative law and general analytical index] Porrúa, Mexico.

1963: A new penal code and urgency in view of the Federal Penal Code, Mexico.

1964-1965: Odysseus, Mexico.

1966: Don Juan Prim, Spanish liberal, Mexico, Ministry of Education (Journal of popular reading).

1968: Meridians of the world, Mexico.

Was also translator of: Anton Chekhov, A crime, Madrid, America Press. A. Housaye, Miss Friné, Madrid, America Press.

w, Criminal Lawyers of Mexico, Criminal Law
