= Loy =

Loy or Loys is a Dutch (Burgundian) given name and a surname, derived from both the German medieval given name Loy and the abbreviated form of the French medieval given name Eloy (or Éloi), themselves from the Latin Eligius (see Eligio). Notable people with the name include:

== Given name ==
- Saint Eligius (c. 588-660), sometimes anglicized as Saint Loy, Frankish goldsmith, courtier, and bishop
- Loy Allen Bowlin (1909–1995), outsider artist
- Loy Allen Jr. (born 1966), former NASCAR driver
- Loy Hanning, Major League Baseball pitcher in 1939 and 1942
- Loy W. Henderson (1892–1986), United States Foreign Service Officer
- Loy Hering (c. 1484–1564), German Renaissance sculptor
- Loy McAfee (1868–1941), American surgeon, bibliographer, and editor
- Loy Mendonsa, Indian film singer
- Loy Petersen (born 1945), retired American professional basketball player
- Loy Vaught (born 1968), retired American basketball player
- Loÿs Delteil (1869–1927), French engraver and lithographer, publisher, dealer, and art historian

== Surname ==
- Angie Loy (born 1982), American field hockey forward
- Brendan Loy, American blogger
- Cathy Jo Loy, American politician
- Christof Loy (born 1962), German opera director
- David Loy (born 1947), American Buddhist philosopher
- Egon Loy (1931–2026), German football goalkeeper
- Frank E. Loy, American diplomat and former United States Under Secretary of State for Global Affairs
- James Loy (born 1942), United States Coast Guard admiral, former TSA administrator, former Deputy Secretary of the U.S. Department of Homeland Security
- Joseph F. Loy (1824–1875), American politician
- Julien Loy (born 1976), French triathlete
- Matthias Loy (1828–1915), American Lutheran theologian
- Mina Loy (1882–1966), British artist, poet, playwright, novelist, futurist, actor, Christian Scientist, designer of lamps and bohemian
- Myrna Loy stage name of American actress Myrna Adele Williams (1903–1993)
- Nanni Loy (1925–1995), Italian film, theatre and TV director
- Rachel Loy, American solo artist
- Rory Loy (born 1988), Scottish footballer
- Tristan Loy (born 1973), French long distance and marathon speed skater and inline speed skater
- William A. Loy (1895-1982), American politician

== See also ==
- the title character of "Helen O'Loy", a 1938 science fiction story by Lester del Rey
- Loys (disambiguation), also Loyse
- Loye, a surname
