= Joaquín Demetrio Casasús =

Mexican politician and economist (1858–1916)

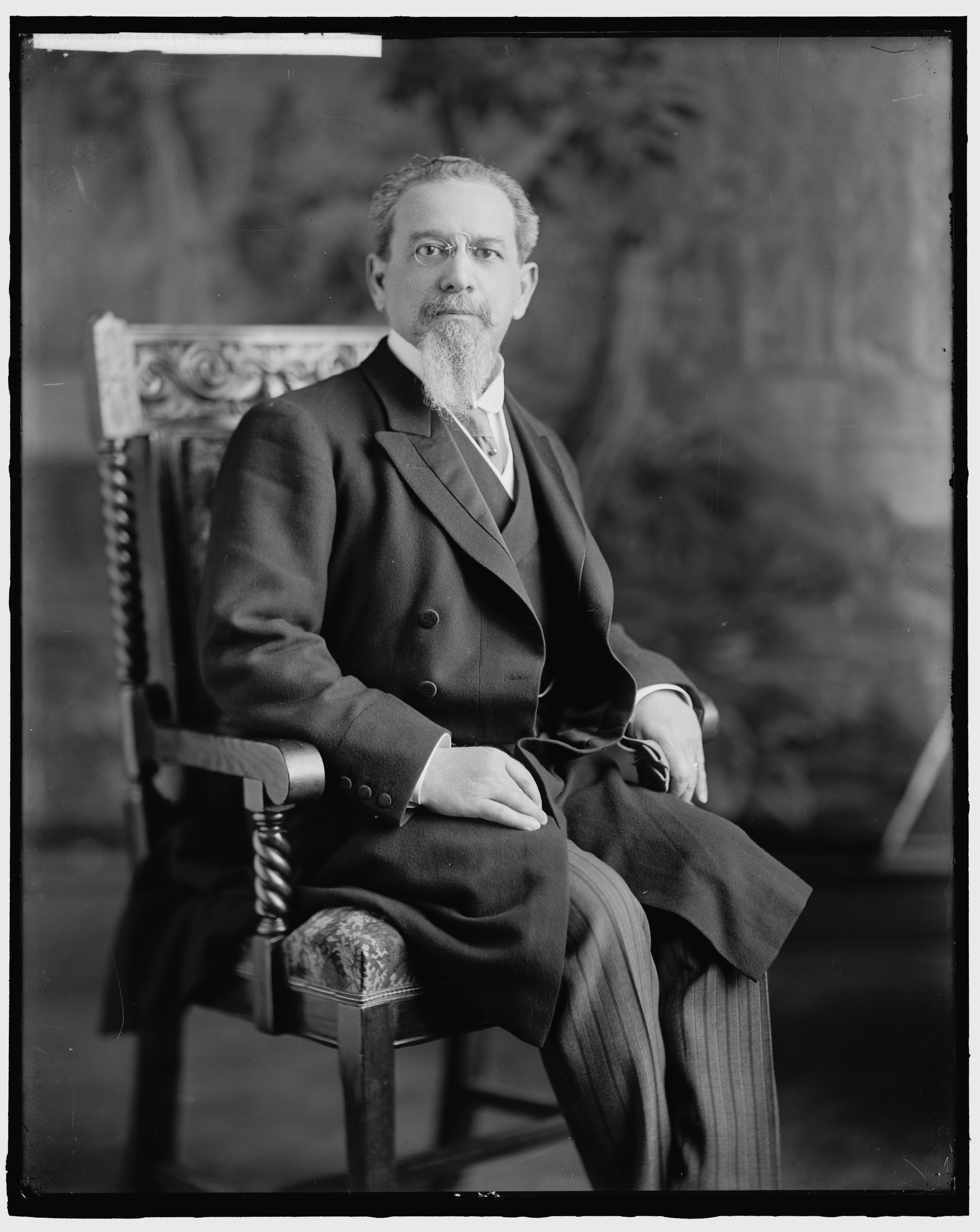

Secretary of Foreign Affairs
- In office 1911–1911
- Preceded by: Francisco León de la Barra
- Succeeded by: Bartolomé Carvajal y Rosas

Personal details
- Born: 1858
- Died: 1916 (aged 57–58)
- Profession: Diplomat

Joaquín Demetrio Casasús (23 December 1858 – 25 February 1916) was a Mexican economist, lawyer, banker, politician, diplomat and writer. He served on two occasions as Ambassador of Mexico to the United States.

During the Porfiriato, he was a prominent member of the Cíentificos, a group of technocrat advisors to President Porfirio Díaz. A noted jurist, he participated in the commissions to draft the Commercial Code (1889), the Banking Law (1897) and the Monetary Law (1905); however, his most notable work as a lawyer was obtaining the ruling favorable to Mexico in the arbitration with the United States in the Chamizal dispute. During his career, he represented Mexico in several international banking congresses. He was also a member of the Academia Mexicana de la Lengua, joining in 1904, and serving president from 1912 until his death. In 1914, during the Mexican Revolution, his mansion in Paseo de la Reforma was occupied by the troops of General Lucio Blanco; Casasús died in exile in New York City in 1916.

== Studies and academia ==
He studied law at the Escuela Nacional de Jurisprudencia of Mexico. After graduating he was made Secretary of State of Tabasco. At the same time, he was a professor of law and economics at the National Autonomous University of Mexico.

During his lifetime he participated in the writing of the Mexican Code of Commerce of 1889 and the Law of Creditary Institutions and Monetary Laws.

== Career ==
In 1892 he represented Mexico at the International Monetary Conference held in Brussels (Belgium). In addition, he was a Federal Deputy and in 1902, he was elected president of the Mexican Congress. In 1911, he was designated by President Porfirio Díaz as president of the Arbitration Commission regarding the U.S- Mexican Chamizal dispute. Along with fellow Federal Deputy, Manuel R. Uruchurtu, he managed to win the definite ruling of King Victor Emanuel II of Italy, in favor of Mexico and against the United States, thus establishing that the Río Bravo was Mexican and not part of the border.

During his life he wrote a great deal of books specially in topics of law and monetary economics and politics.

== Personal life ==
Joaquín Demetrio Casasús was married to Catalina Altamirano, daughter of Ignacio Manuel Altamirano, and the couple had a son, Mario Casasús Altamirano.

== Publications ==
- La reforma monetaria en Mexico: Informes presentados á la Comisión Monetaria (1905)
- The Pan-American conferences and their significance (1906)
- Mexico (1911)
- Cayo Valerio Catulo: su vida y sus obras (1904) with Victoriano Salado Alvarez
- Gaius Valerius Catullus (1906)
- Las reformas a la Ley de Instituciones de crédito (1908)
