= Sant'Eligio dei Chiavettieri =

Church in Naples, Italy

Coordinates: 40.849520°N 14.263450°E

Sant'Eligio dei Chiavettieri (once known as Santa Maria ad Ercole) is a Roman Catholic church in Naples, Italy, located at the intersection of via Cesare Sersale and vicoletto Chiavettieri al Pendino.

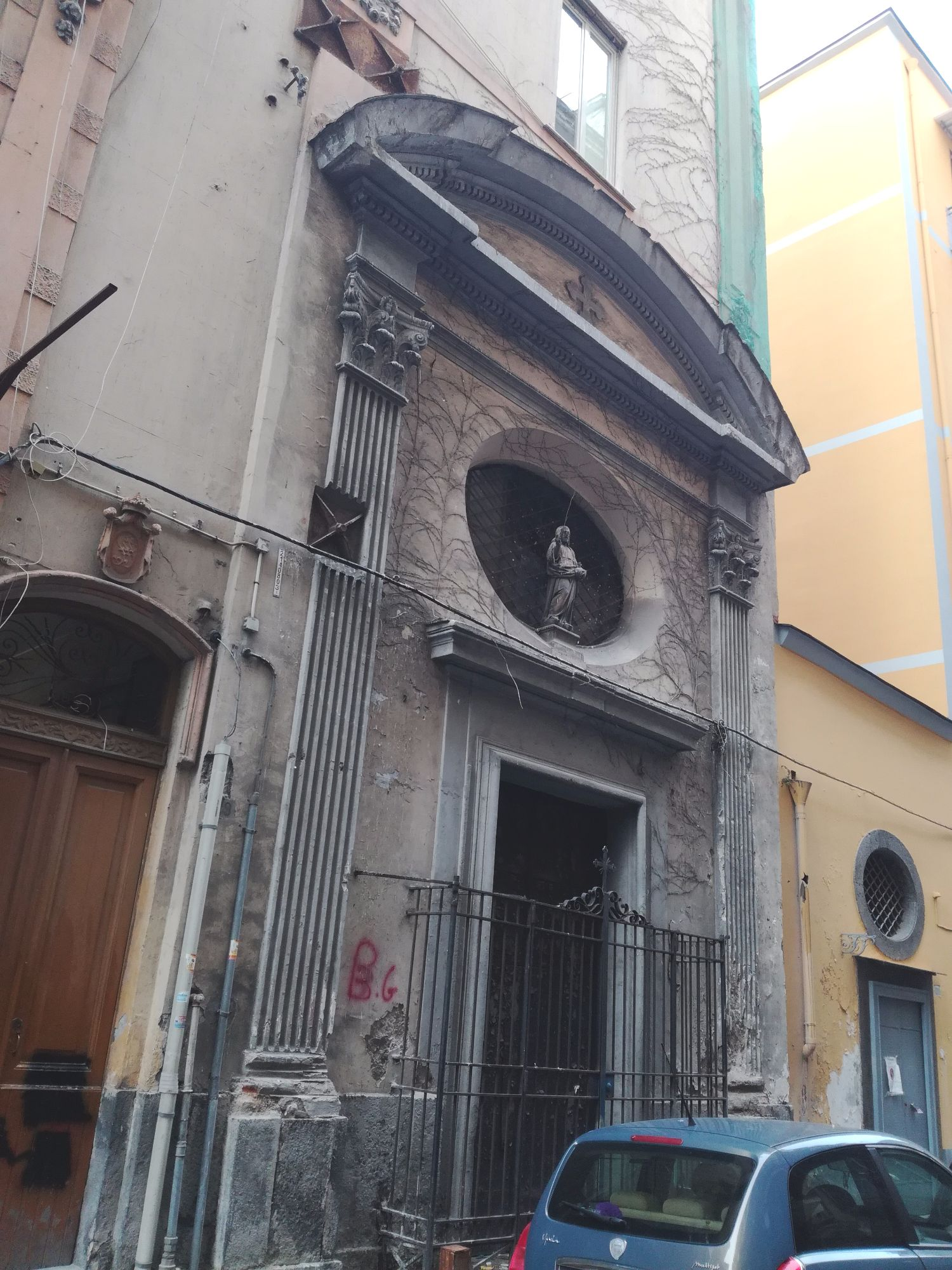
Facade.

== History ==
The church arose during the Swabian rule of Naples. The origin of the tag of Hercules is uncertain. Some suggests that the site once held a temple of Hercules while others claim a d'Ercole family of this street patronized the founding of the church. In the 15th century, the church was ceded to the guild of swordsmen (spadari) and then the confraternity of the locksmiths (chiavettieri o fabbricanti di chiavi), who rededicated the church to Sant'Eligio. In 1624, it became the home of the Congregation of Salvatore e di Santa Maria Materdei, who redecorated it in baroque style. The facade has a 19th-century statue of the Redeemer. It once held an altarpiece attributed to Pietro and Polito del Donzello.
