= Eligio Ancona =

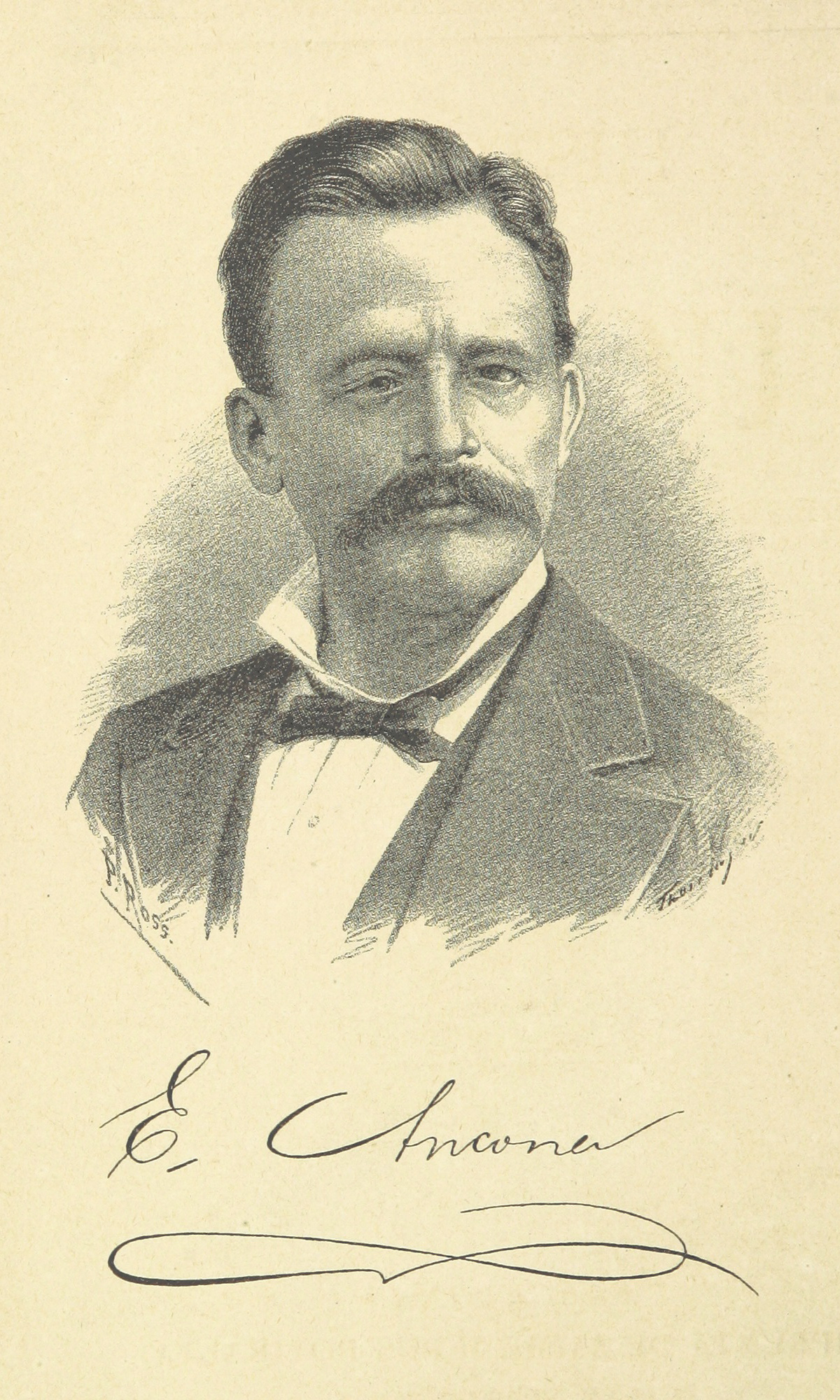
Eligio Ancona

Eligio María Ancona Castillo (November 30, 1836 – April 3, 1893) was a teacher, lawyer, novelist, historian, playwright, journalist, and Mexican politician who was born in Mérida, Yucatán. He was named "benemérito" of the state of Yucatán, a title given to distinguished people who have made significant achievements in their fields.

Ancona was the governor of Yucatán first as interim in 1868, and after, between 1875 and 1876. Later he was the secretary for the Supreme Court of Justice of the Nation (La Suprema Corte de Justicia de la Nación). He also published a notable compendium of the history of Yucatán in 1889.

Ancona died in Mexico City in 1893. He made many contributions to literature and politics and was honored when his remains were interred on April 13, 1903 at the Rotunda of Illustrious Persons. Eligio Ancona was father to Antonio Ancona Albertos, who was the governor of Yucatán and the representative constituent of Mexico in 1916 and 1917. Ancona was also the father of mathematician and journalist Joaquín Ancona Albertos.

== Early years and studies ==
Eligio Ancona received his bachelor's degree in Mérida in the Clerical Seminary of San Ildefonso. He continued his studies in the Literary University of the State, and he was licensed as a lawyer in 1862.

== Political career ==
Eligio Ancona was a councilor on the city council of Mérida, but when the Second Mexican Empire took control, he disagreed with the new regimen so much that he declared himself republican and abandoned his post. He criticized the regimen of Maximilian I by writing and directing the newspaper, The Pill (La Píldora), which was quickly censored by the government. In 1866, he made a second attempt at critical journalism by directing Yucatán. Again, his work was censored, and this time he was apprehended and sent to the island of Cozumel.

In 1865 he joined the liberal groups that supported Benito Juárez, the governor. In order to restore a republic form of government to the Yucatán peninsula, Juárez named Ancona the secretary general of the government and interim governor of Yucatán in 1868. Once Ancona had accomplished his goal of restoring the country, he was approved as constitutional governor of the state of Yucatán in 1875. However, since he did not officially endorse the revolution of Tuxtepec nor the behavior of Profirio Diaz, he decided to abandon his post. Nevertheless, Ancona was later named magistrate of the Tribunal of the Yucatán Circuit. For his experience as a legal expert, Ancona was designated magistrate of the Supreme Court of Justice in 1891. In the twilight of his life he was deputed to the federal congress in representation of Yucatán. He was also a member of the Society of Geography and Statistics.

== Debate ==
There exists some debate over the exact date of Ancona's birth. There are two possibilities for his birthday: the first is recorded as December 1, 1836 by Francisco Sosa in "The Contemporaries" (1884) and by Gustavo Martínez Alomía in Historians of Yucatán (1906). The second, November 30, 1835, was mentioned by the cited source, as well as by diverse authors like Manuel Mestre Ghigliazza, member of the Mexican Academy of History, in his book Biographies of Today in History (1945). The controversy was seemingly elucidated in 1936, when the baptismal record of Eligio Jesús Acona Castillo was found in the parochial archives of the cathedral of Yucatán with Ancona's birthday listed as November 30, 1835.

== Bibliography ==
- Ancona, Eligio (1870) Los mártires del Anáhuac, Barcelona, ed. Planeta DeAgostini (2004), ISBN 970-726-215-X
- Barrera Osorio, Abelardo. (1981). Próceres yucatecos. Mérida, Comisión editorial de Yucatán.
- Castro Leal, Antonio (1965) La novela del México colonial, México, ed. Aguilar Mexicana de ediciones.
- Esquivel Pren, José (1975) Historia de la literatura en Yucatán, México, Ediciones de la Universidad de Yucatán.
- Hamnett, Brian. "Maximilian (1832–1867)." Encyclopedia of Latin American History and Culture. Ed. Jay Kinsbruner and Erick D. Langer. Vol. 4. 2nd ed. Detroit: Charles Scribner's Sons, 2008. pp 419–420. Accessed through Gale Virtual Reference Library.
- Peniche Vallado, Leopoldo. (1996). José Antonio Cisneros: Poeta, dramaturgo y servidor público. Otros ensayos acerca de escritores representativos de las letras yucatecas. Mérida, Ediciones de la UADY.
- Richmond, Douglas W. and Muse Project (2015). Conflict and Carnage in Yucatán : Liberals, the Second Empire, and Maya Revolutionaries, 1855–1876. Tuscaloosa: U. of Alabama P. ISBN 978-0-8173-1870-3 – via EBSCOHOST.
- Stevens, D.F. "Juárez, Benito (1806–1872)." Encyclopedia of Latin American History and Culture. Ed. Jay Kinsbruner and Erick D. Langer. Vol. 4. 2nd ed. Detroit: Charles Scribner's Sons, 2008. pp 51–54. Accessed through Gale Virtual Learning Resource Library.
