= Eligio Lofranco =

Filipino lawyer (born 1943)

Eligio B. Lofranco, known as Dong/Lieux, (born December 1, 1943, in Loon, Bohol) was a Filipino polymath, a public prosecutor in Quezon City, and later a Division Chief. Born as the 3rd of the 13 children in Loon, Bohol to a wealthy family, he was a poet, writer, labor leader, bowler, painter, and fisherman.

== Biography ==
=== Early life and education ===
Lieux was born on December 1, 1943, in Loon, Bohol to Sergio Lofranco, a local guerrilla dentist, and Susana Bananola, a former public servant. He completed his primary education at Calape Elementary School and secondary education at Bohol Provincial Institute, where he became a salutatorian. He attended the University of the Bohol in Tagbilaran, Bohol where he took 18 Units for his MBA and earned his Associate in Arts in 1965 (Cum Laude) major in English, a Bachelor of Science in Education major in History in 1967, and a Bachelor of Laws degree in 1972.

=== Career ===
From 1965 to 1975, Lieux worked as a high school teacher and secretary of Bohol Chamber of Commerce at the same university. He then became a Right Of Way agent in 1976 for National Power Corporation. From 1980 to 1991, he became a Supervising Row Agent, a Row Assistant B, a Senior Corporate and Trial Attorney, and a Senior Employee Relations Specialist. From 1985 to 1990, he was a Special Attorney to the Office of The Solicitor General. In 1992 he became a public prosecutor and was recognized for his good service and citizenship for 3 decades. He was also a professor at FEU-FERN and taught Legal and Judicial Ethics, Criminal Law and Civil & Criminal Procedure. He retired from service in 2008 and now works as a private practitioner in his Law Office (Lofranco Law Office). In April 2010, he came back to serve the government as a Chief of Staff of a Commissioner in NAPOLCOM.
