= Pablo Castellanos Cámara =

American-Mexican pianist

- Born: 1917; Los Angeles, California
- Died: 1981 (aged 63–64); Mexico City, Mexico
- Education: Conservatoire de Paris; École Normale de Musique de Paris; Berlin University of the Arts
- Occupations: pianist; conductor; music teacher
- Spouse: Elena Schneider
- Children: 2
- Parent(s): Hortensia Cámara Vales (mother); Pablo Castellanos León (father)

Pablo Castellanos Cámara (1917–1981) was a virtuoso pianist, conductor, and music teacher who held dual American and Mexican nationality.

Castellanos came from a distinguished lineage of musicians (both parents were concert pianists) and public figures. After receiving a solid musical education in the United States, France, and Germany, studying with renowned musicians such as Alfred Cortot and Edwin Fischer, Castellanos settled in Mexico. He performed concerts throughout the country and taught at educational institutions such as the National Conservatory of Music and UNAM, shaping a new generation of prominent pianists. In addition to his career as a concert pianist, Castellanos was prolific in writing, dedicating much of his life to research and publishing works on the history of music, with his notable work being Horizons of Pre-Columbian Music (1980).

== Biography ==
=== Family Origins ===
He was born in Los Angeles, California in 1917 while his family, originally from Mérida, Yucatán, were exiled due to the Mexican Revolution, a social uprising that threatened the traditional, landowning upper classes. He was the only son of Pablo Castellanos León and Hortensia Cámara Vales, both his parents were virtuoso pianists.

His paternal grandfather was Pablo Castellanos Rejón, a lawyer and politician who had served as governor of Yucatán during the Caste Wars. Meanwhile, his maternal grandfather was Raymundo Cámara Luján, a business magnate and head of the Cámara clan, a "powerful family of the high Yucatecan aristocracy."

Several members of his close family had distinguished political careers. José María Pino Suárez, his uncle, served as vice-president of Mexico and was a key figure of the Mexican Revolution before being assassinated in February 1913 during the Ten Tragic Days. Shortly after these events, fearing persecution from the Huerta military dictatorship, the Castellanos Cámara family exiled themselves in the United States and France. Meanwhile, two of his uncles, Alfredo and Nicolás Cámara Vales, also served as governor of Quintana Roo and Yucatán, respectively. Agustín Vales Castillo, his great-uncle, was a business magnate who served as mayor of Mérida in the early 20th century. Similarly, Alfredo Pino Cámara, his first cousin, was an associate justice of the Supreme Court of Justice of the Nation. His cousin, Ismael Moreno Pino, was the undersecretary of foreign affairs and ambassador, posted in Berlin, The Hague, Washington, D.C., Geneva and New York City, among others.

Fernando Cámara Barbachano, another cousin, was a distinguished social anthropologist and museum director.

=== Education ===
Castellanos began his musical studies in Los Angeles under Pablo Castellanos León, his father, and Alexis Kall, the eminent Russian pianist. Afterward, following his father's footsteps, he continued his musical education in Europe, studying at the Conservatoire de Paris and at the École Normale de Musique de Paris under Alfred Cortot on the recommendation of Manuel M. Ponce. In 1931, aged fourteen, he graduated with a diplôme d'Aptitude a l'Enseginement du Piano. He finished his studies at the Berlin Conservatory where he studied under Edwin Fischer and Max Seiffert.

=== Career ===
After his studies in Europe, he settled in Mexico. Although he had never lived there before, it was a country where his name was well known due to his parents. He offered concerts in the country's most important artistic forums and premiered several works by Mexican authors.

He was a professor of piano and history of music in Mexico at the National Conservatory of Music and at the National School of Music at the National University of Mexico (UNAM). He trained prominent pianists such as Carlos Barajas, Paolo Mello and Lucero Enríquez.

He was the author of a large number of writings (some published, others unpublished), mainly on the history of music dedicating a large part of his life to this endeavor. One of these works was Horizons of Pre-Columbian Music (In Spanish: "horizontes de la música precortesiana") published by Fondo de Cultura Económica in 1980. He also made a compilation of writing on the work of Manuel M. Ponce, revised by Paolo Mello and published by UNAM.

Castellanos became a full member of the Mexican Culture Seminar (Seminario de Cultura Mexicana), which "is made up of eminent people in the areas of science, humanities and culture who share their knowledge through conferences, workshops, concerts, and exhibitions" on October 5, 1967.

In 1998, the daughters of Castellanos donated their father's private library to the National School of Music at UNAM, which includes his books, sheet music, microfiche, record collection (78 and 33 revolutions), tapes, and his square piano.

=== Private life ===
In April 1942, he married Elena Schneider. The couple had two daughters: Paulina and Martha.

== Works ==
- Horizons of Pre-Columbian Music (In Spanish: "horizontes de la música precortesiana") published by Fondo de Cultura Económica in 1980.
