= Raymundo Cámara Luján =

Mexican business magnate

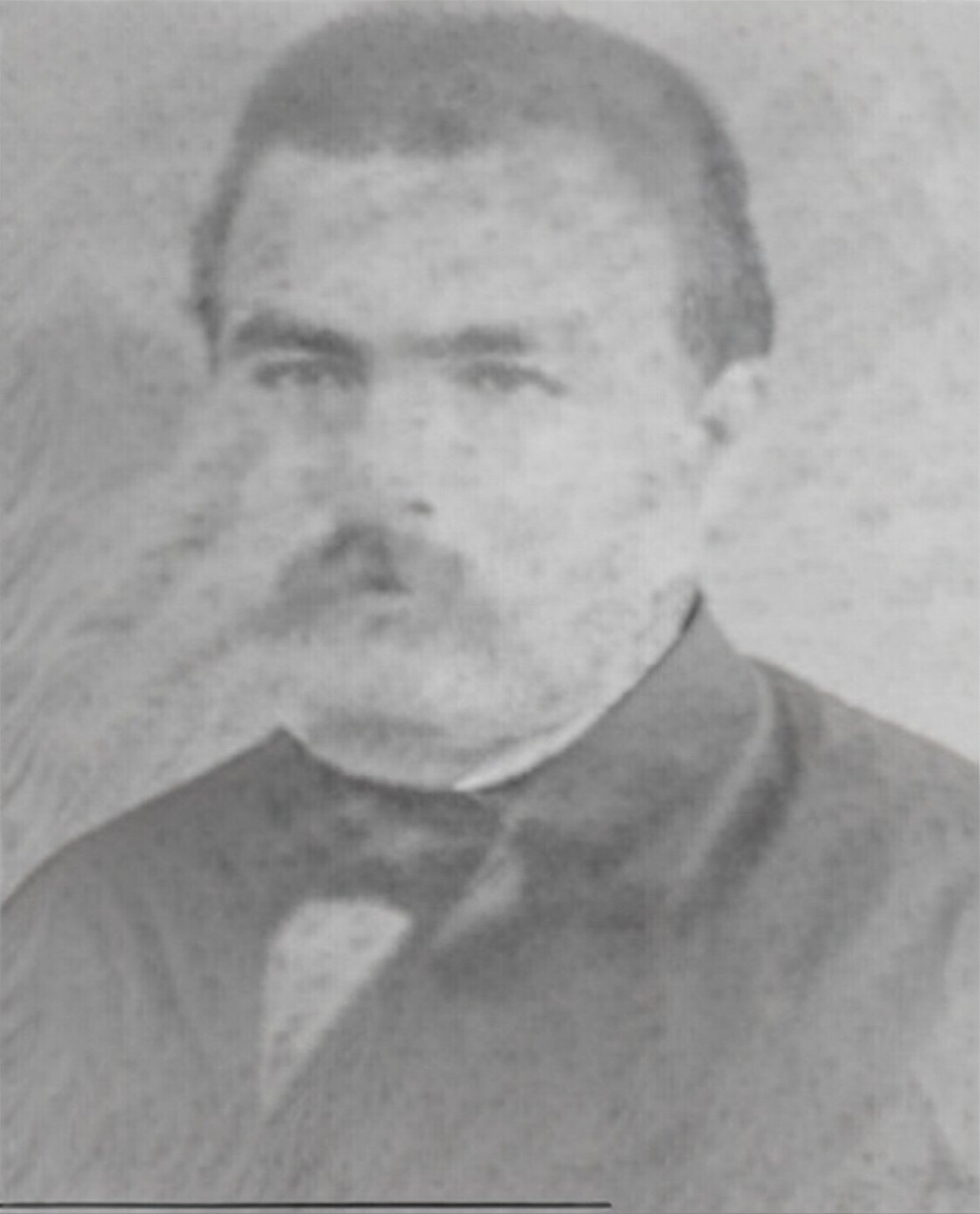
- Born: May 14, 1850; Mérida, Yucatán, Mexico
- Died: April 15, 1919 (aged 68); Mérida, Yucatán, Mexico
- Occupations: Industrialist; banker; landowner
- Spouse: María del Carmen Vales Castillo
- Children: 12, including Nicolás, Alfredo and María

Raymundo Cámara Luján (May 14, 1850 – April 15, 1919) was a prominent Mexican entrepreneur, banker, landowner, and philanthropist who played a significant role in the economic expansion that the Yucatán Peninsula experienced in the late 19th and early 20th centuries.

Cámara owned numerous haciendas and excelled in agricultural activities, particularly in the production of henequen and sugarcane. In partnership with José María Ponce Solís, he founded an exporting company that became one of the main henequen traders, and he also ventured into the financial sector by providing loans to henequen producers and entrepreneurs from other industries. His business interests spanned various sectors, including railways, banking, breweries, and the exploitation of various raw materials such as chewing gum, tobacco, cocoa, cotton, bananas, vanilla, and forest resources.

Cámara was renowned for his progressive labor practices, exemplified by implementing reforms like establishing a minimum wage, an 8-hour workday, worker mobility, rural schools, and the right to unionize. Motivated by his Catholic beliefs and driven by pragmatism, he sought to treat his workers with respect while also boosting productivity and profitability. Despite facing criticism over the perceived costliness of the reforms, Cámara's efforts proved successful, significantly improving the lives of numerous workers in Yucatán. Notably, his children Nicolás and Alfredo Cámara Vales achieved prominent political careers as Governors of Yucatán and Quintana Roo, respectively, while his son-in-law, José María Pino Suárez, served as Vice President of Mexico.

== Early years ==
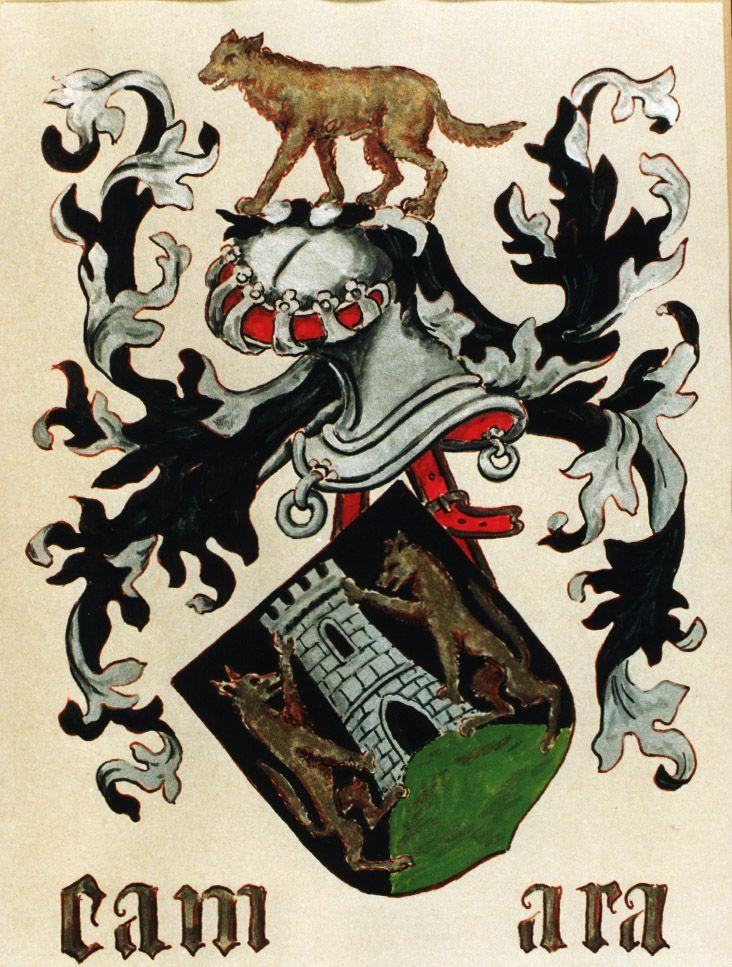
Coat of arms of the Cámara family

Raymundo was born on May 14, 1850, in Mérida, Yucatán. Five days later, he was baptized at the Cathedral of San Ildefonso, following a three-hundred year old Cámara family tradition. The ceremony was officiated by José María Guerra y Rodríguez Correa, the Archbishop of Yucatán, and witnessed by Miguel Barbachano y Tarrazo, the Governor of Yucatán.

He was the firstborn child of the marriage between Don Nicolás de la Cámara y Castillo (1823–1866), a well-known landowner, and Evarista Luján Domínguez (1832–1904). On his father's side, it was said that he "belonged to a family of ancient lineage." The Cámara family had been knighted in the Kingdom of Castile since the early 13th century and descended from Juan de la Cámara, a Spanish nobleman and conquistador who arrived in Yucatán in 1539 alongside Francisco de Montejo, participating in the Spanish conquest of Yucatán. Since their arrival on the Yucatán Peninsula in the first half of the 16th century, the Cámara family became one of the region's main landowners, a position they enjoyed throughout the viceregal period. On the other hand, through his mother, Raymundo descended from the Luján family, a well-known family of the lower nobility in the Kingdom of Aragon.

== Education ==
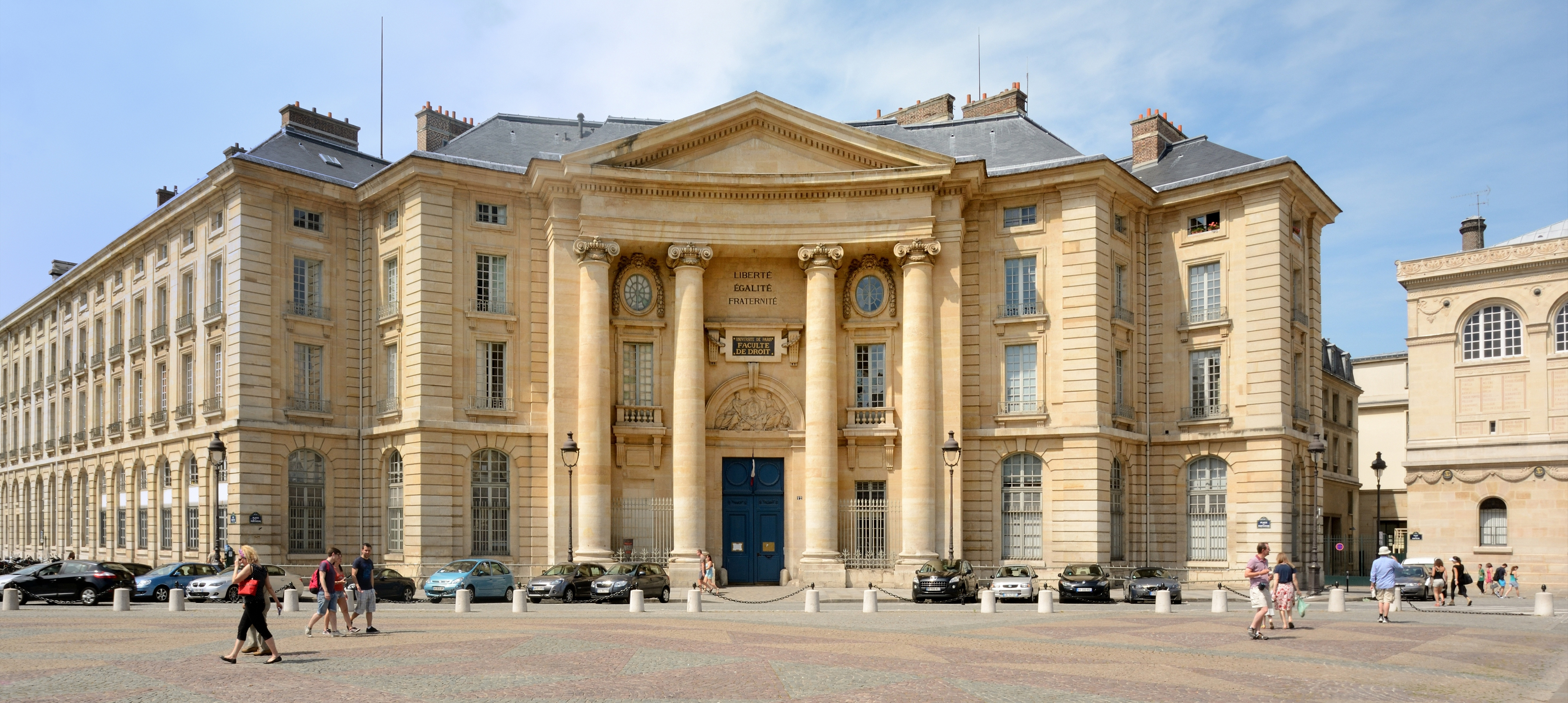
Faculty of Law of Paris

He pursued his schooling at the Lycée Louis-le-Grand in Paris, France, where he obtained a scientific baccalaureate (baccalauréat scientifique) and completed the first two years of university in the preparatory classes for top engineering schools (classes préparatoires aux grandes écoles). He continued his studies at the École polytechnique, where he earned an engineering degree. Additionally, he obtained a Bachelor of Laws from the Faculty of Law of Paris (La Sorbonne).

He also pursued studies in agricultural engineering at the Royal Agricultural College in Cirencester, England.

== Business career ==
=== Henequen hacienda owner and other agricultural activities ===
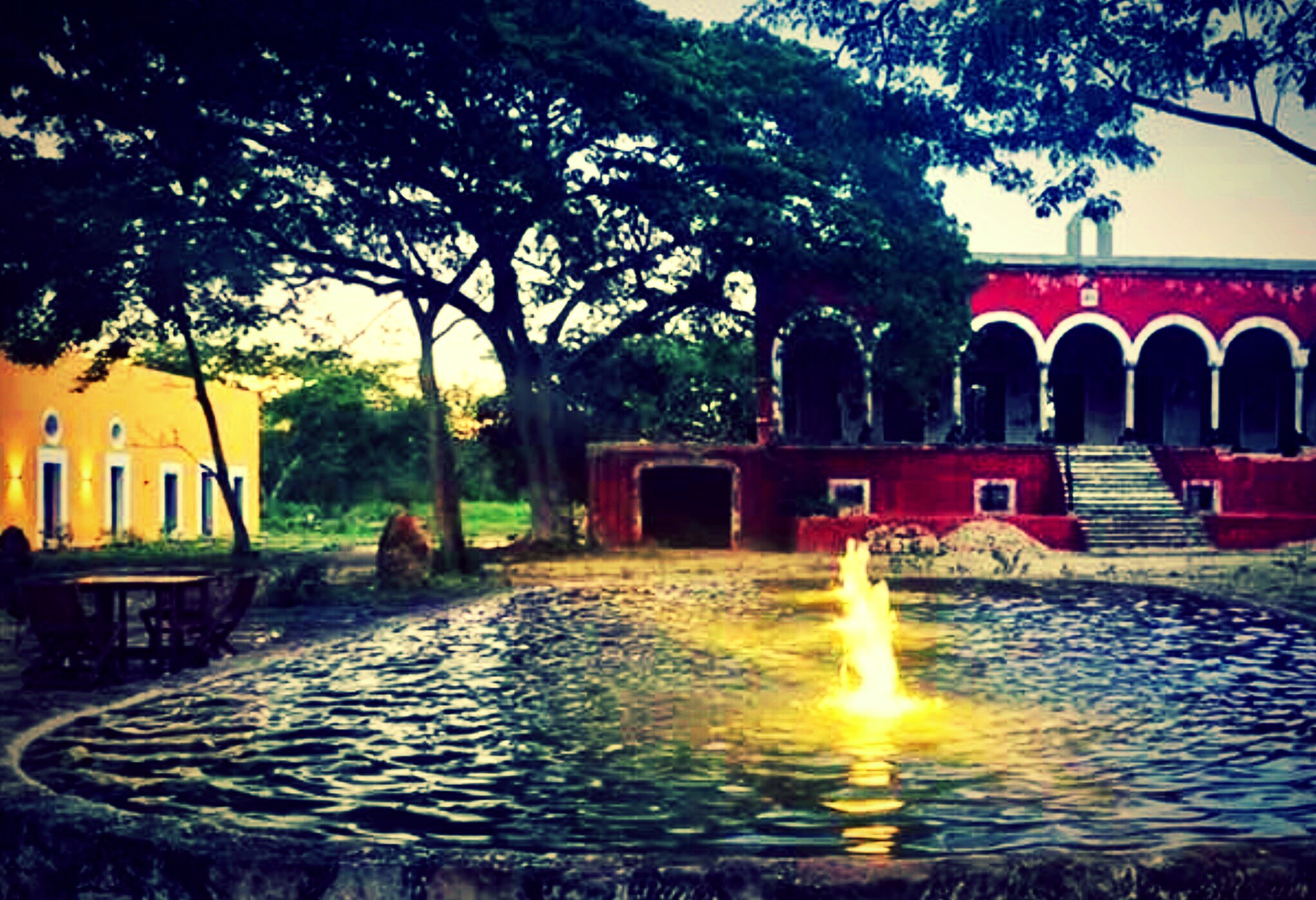
He was the owner of numerous estates in Temax, among which the haciendas of San Antonio Cámara and Chucmichén (pictured) stood out, together encompassing a total area of 7,812 hectares (78.12 km^{2}) dedicated to the exploitation of henequen.

Cámara was the owner of several estates in Temax, including the Haciendas of San Antonio Cámara and Chucmichén. These two haciendas, together, had a combined area of 7,812 hectares (78.12 km^{2}) dedicated to henequen production, roughly the size of Guernsey.

In 1887, he partnered with the Villamil Vales family to establish the Compañía Particular de Fomento de Fincas, S.A., with the aim of exploiting and producing henequen. They acquired Hacienda San Diego Tixcacal in Opichén, Hacienda de Santa Cruz, and Hacienda de Subintal in Huhí for this purpose.

Cámara was also the owner of Hacienda de Tekik, a henequen hacienda in Timucuy.

His agricultural activities were not limited solely to henequen production but also included ownership of various sugar mills dedicated to sugarcane production. After Manuel Cicerol, owner of Hacienda de Catmís in Tzucacab, Cámara became the second most important sugarcane producer in the Yucatán Peninsula.

Among the mills operated by Cámara, the Hacienda de Dziuché in Hoctún stands out, producing approximately 12,000 kilograms of sugar and around 10,000 kilograms of honey per year.

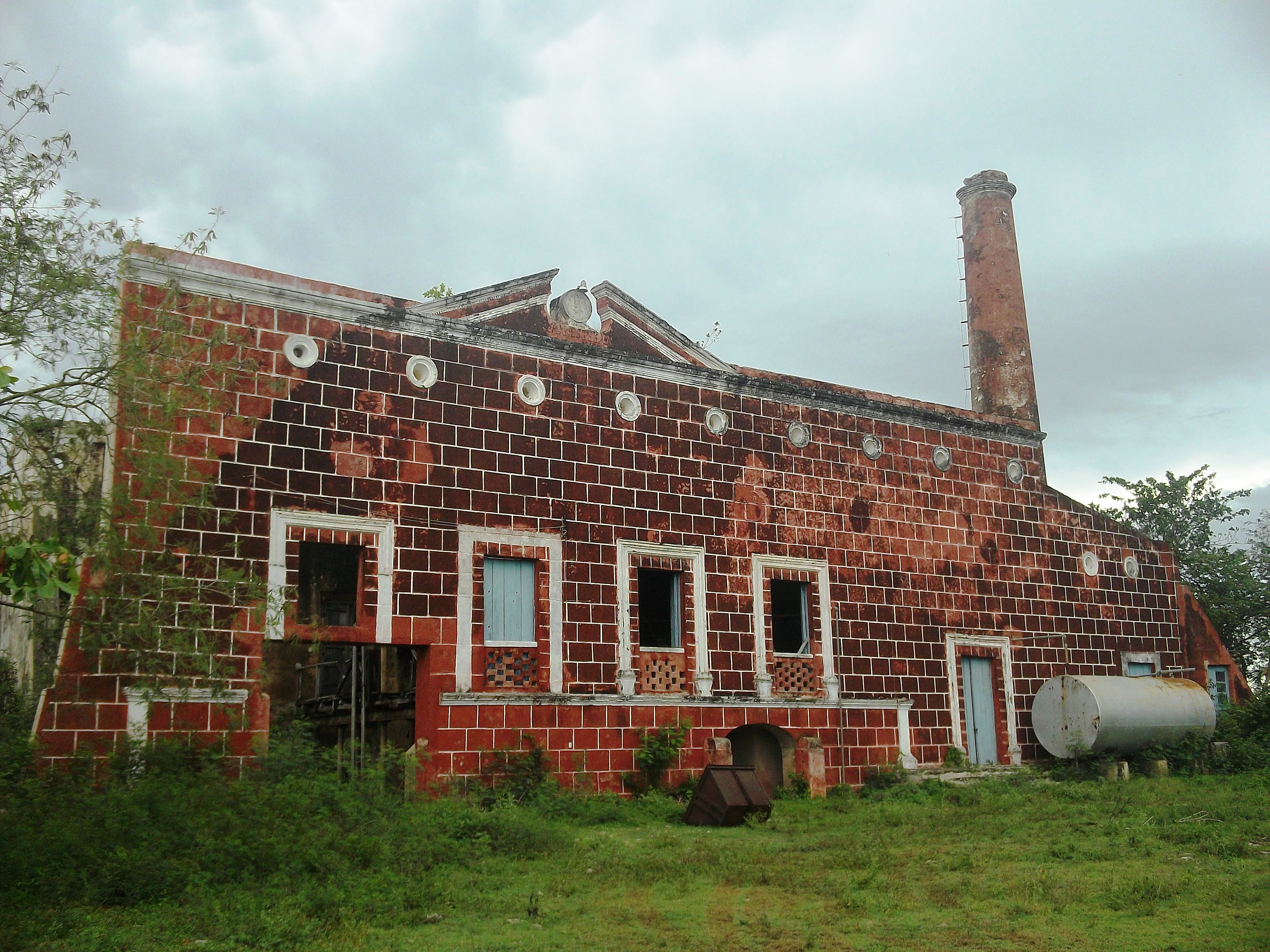
The sugar mill of the Dziuché Hacienda in Hoctún produced approximately 12,000 kilograms of sugarcane and around 10,000 kilograms of honey per year.

Similarly, he owned Hacienda Polyuc, a sugar mill located in Tekax. Between 1906 and 1909, this hacienda was managed by José María Pino Suárez, Cámara's son-in-law. In Polyuc, Pino Suárez established a school to provide free education to the workers and allowed them to seek employment in other haciendas.

Together with Felipe Peón, Eusebio Escalante, and Rafael Hernández Escudero, Cámara was the owner of Hacienda Yokat in Ticul. It was a cattle ranch as well as a sugar and henequen hacienda.

The Haciendas of Yokat and Polyuc were sold to Augusto L. Peón after the Panic of 1907. Upon acquiring Polyuc, Peón continued to host Pino Suárez, becoming one of his main benefactors.

Once again associated with Escalante, Cámara was a co-owner of a 2,627 km^{2} property in Hacienda Santa María in Quintana Roo (Compañía Agrícola del Cuyo y Anexas, S.A.), roughly the size of Luxembourg.

Influenced by his son-in-law, José María Pino Suárez, a lawyer and social reformer, Cámara implemented progressive labor practices, providing favorable working conditions for the workers in his mills. He introduced reforms such as establishing a minimum wage, an 8-hour workday, and ensuring worker mobility and the ability to negotiate working conditions across haciendas. Additionally, he prioritized education by establishing rural schools on his properties to teach basic literacy to workers and their families. Notably, the Hacienda de Dziuché became an early adopter of workers' unions, inspiring other landowners in Yucatán to follow suit. Cámara's progressive ideals were driven by his devout Catholicism and belief in treating workers with respect, while also recognizing the practical benefits of improved conditions in terms of productivity and profits. Although his reforms faced criticism from some who deemed them costly and detrimental to the henequen industry, they ultimately succeeded in enhancing the lives of thousands of workers in Yucatán.

=== Ponce Trading House ===
In the late 19th century, Cámara joined forces with his brother-in-law, José María Ponce Solís, to establish the trading house José Ma. Ponce y Cía, which quickly became one of the primary exporters of henequen. Between 1898 and 1902, their firm was responsible for exporting approximately 16% of the henequen fiber bales, totaling around 13 million kilograms annually to the U.S. market—equivalent to roughly 28.6 million pounds. At that time, henequen was priced at US$9.48 per pound, resulting in the firm's substantial revenue of approximately US$272 million in 1900. Adjusted for inflation, this 1900 revenue would amount to approximately US$9.9 billion in 2023.

In addition to their role as exporters, the company evolved into a financial institution, extending credit to both henequen producers and entrepreneurs from various sectors. Notably, they played a pivotal role in financing the construction of the railway connecting Mérida and Valladolid, later expanding this network to include Conkal to Progreso. This infrastructure was crucial for efficiently transporting henequen from the northeastern region of Mérida to the shipping ports.

However, by 1904, the operations of the firm led by Ponce Solís and Cámara drew to a halt.

The sudden disappearance of the company can be attributed to a combination of political and economic factors. On the political front, General Cantón's government was replaced by Olegario Molina, marking the transition to the first civilian Governor of the Porfiriato. The political collaboration between General Cantón and José María Ponce Solís, who had also served as the Mayor of Mérida from 1900 to 1902, came to an end. In the same year, the International Harvester emerged, resulting from the merger of sixteen American companies manufacturing agricultural machinery and cordage. This merger created a near-monopoly on henequen fiber, solidifying their control of the market. The henequen market's fate was sealed with a secret agreement between Olegario Molina, then governor (though formally separated from his henequen exporting company), and the International Harvester, which kept fiber prices artificially low in exchange for acquiring increasing volumes of the Yucatecan product.

Due to this secret cartel, the United States, being the primary importer of henequen, transitioned from a price taker to a price maker, causing the price of henequen to plummet from approximately US$9.48 per pound to a fixed rate of just 8 cents per pound. Faced with this new market reality, Ponce and Cámara strategically decided to reduce their involvement in the henequen market and began diversifying their interests. In 1900, they ventured into a new business direction, opening Cervecería Yucateca, S.A., a brewery. This marked a significant shift in their business portfolio.

=== Cuyo Agricultural Company ===
Cámara also maintained close business ties with Eusebio Escalante.

The Escalante family had been one of the main driving forces behind the henequen industry in the mid-19th century. The Escalantes, who were relatives of Carlos Peón, the liberal governor of Yucatán between 1894 and 1897, managed to thrive both during his tenure and during the conservative government of Francisco Cantón, who was governor between 1898 and 1902. However, the Escalantes were always competitors, both in business and politics, of Olegario Molina, who, backed by the regime of Porfirio Díaz, maintained strong political and economic control over the state from 1902 to 1911.

In collaboration with Escalante, Agustín Vales, and other Yucatecan entrepreneurs, Cámara founded the Compañía Agrícola del Cuyo y Anexas, S.A. (The Cuyo Agricultural Company), where he owned approximately one-fifth of the share capital. This company employed over 1,500 workers and controlled an extensive estate of 2,627 square kilometers (roughly the size of Luxembourg or Rhode Island) located in the northwest area of Yucatán, which was "crossed by 168 km of its own telephone lines, an animal-drawn Decauville line with 60 platforms and 500 mules, a broad-gauge railway with 12 platforms and a locomotive, a 167-m-wide dock and even a 500-ton steamship." The land owned by the company was:

"rich in dye wood, ideal for the cultivation of sugarcane, vanilla, tobacco, corn or cereals, as well as suitable for harvesting sea salt [...] Among the productive activities of the plantation, we can highlight the exploitation of forest resources (dyewoods, precious woods for cabinetmaking, and hard woods for construction), as well as the extraction of resins (chicle), the production of sea salt, the cultivation of sugarcane, the development of tobacco, cocoa, cotton, banana, and vanilla plantations, the latter brought from Papantla, Veracruz. Likewise, for self-consumption by its inhabitants, corn, rice, beans, and all other available natural products were produced on the mentioned estate [...] The dye wood exported by the Company was in demand in the European textile manufacturing markets of Hamburg, Le Havre, and Liverpool. As for chicle, its main destination was New York City, with an average commercialization of 400,000 kg per year."

In his activities in The Cuyo Agricultural Company, Cámara faced strong competition from the Compañía Colonizadora de la Costa Oriental de Yucatán, S.A., which involved the participation of Olegario Molina and several capitalists from Mexico City close to the group of los Cíentificos. The incursion of this group into the economy of Yucatán was interpreted as part of the actions to curb the expansion of Yucatecan henequen producers, an aspect that was reinforced with the creation of the Territory of Quintana Roo.

== The Mercantile Bank of Yucatán ==
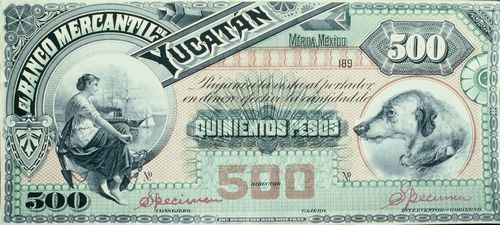
1890 banknote issued by Banco Mercantil de Yucatan, S.A.

In 1890, the Mercantile Bank of Yucatán, S.A., the first bank in the region, was founded. Cámara was one of the bank's founders and participated in its first board of directors. The Mercantile Bank maintained close ties with the business interests of the Escalante and Cámara families. However, it faced strong competition from the Yucatecan Bank, S.A., which was associated with the Molina family. Amid the Panic of 1907, a severe economic crisis on an international level, both banks were greatly affected and were forced to merge under the supervision of the Ministry of finance, forming the Banco Peninsular Mexicano, S.A. (currently part of Banamex).

== Personal life ==
On June 20, 1874, he married María del Carmen Vales Castillo at the Cathedral of San Ildefonso. María del Carmen was the daughter of Agustín Vales and María del Carmen Castillo Dafrota. María del Carmen's brother, Agustín Vales Castillo, was a prominent banker, entrepreneur, and landowner who held the position of Mayor of Mérida during the Porfiriato.

Out of their fourteen children, the surviving ones were Nicolás, María, Feliciana, Alfredo, Hortensia, María del Carmen, María Lucrecia, Raymundo, Leonor, Hernán, Jorge, and Elía.

Nicolás and Alfredo Cámara Vales were politicians closely associated with the Maderista movement and held the positions of Governor of Yucatán and Quintana Roo, respectively.

María, the eldest daughter, received the Belisario Domínguez Medal of Honor in 1969. She married José María Pino Suárez, who served as Vice President of Mexico from 1911 to 1913. They were the parents of Alfredo Pino Cámara, who served as a Justice of the Supreme Court. They were also the grandparents of Ismael Moreno Pino, a jurist, diplomat, and ambassador who was one of the main negotiators of the Tlatelolco Treaty, which prohibited nuclear weapons in Latin America and the Caribbean.

Hortensia married Pablo Castellanos León, a renowned pianist, and they were the parents of Pablo Castellanos Cámara, another distinguished pianist.

Finally, Hernán married Jacinta Barbachano Bolio, and they were the parents of Fernando Cámara Barbachano, a distinguished social anthropologist and museologist associated with the National Institute of Anthropology and History.
