= Nicolás Cámara Vales =

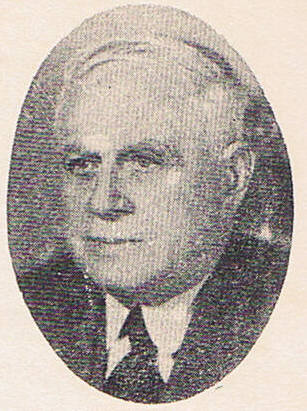

Governor of Yucatán
- In office 1912–1913
- Preceded by: Agustín Patrón Correa
- Succeeded by: Fernando Solís León

Governor of Yucatán
- In office 1911–1911
- Preceded by: José María Pino Suárez
- Succeeded by: Agustín Patrón Correa

Personal details
- Born: 1875 Mérida, Yucatán, Mexico
- Died: 1956 (aged 81) Mexico City, Mexico
- Party: Progressive Constitutionalist Party
- Spouse: Joaquina Millet Heredia
- Children: Berta; Nicolás; Jorge
- Parent(s): María del Carmen Vales Castillo (mother); Raymundo Cámara Luján (father)
- Relatives: Pino- Cámara family María Cámara Vales (sister); José María Pino Suárez (brother-in-law); Alfredo Cámara Vales (brother); Agustín Vales Castillo (uncle); Pablo Castellanos León (brother-in-law); Pablo Castellanos Cámara (nephew); Fernando Cámara Barbachano (nephew); Ismael Moreno Pino (grandnephew)
- Education: University of Berlin (M.D)
- Occupation: Pediatrician, politician and diplomat
- Profession: Doctor of Medicine

Nicolás Cámara Vales (1875 — 1956) was a Mexican liberal politician, diplomat and physician who served twice as governor of Yucatán between 1911 and 1913 during the early stages of the Mexican Revolution. He was also the brother-in-law of José María Pino Suárez, who held the position of vice president of Mexico during the same period.

He was born in Mérida, Yucatán, into the Cámara family, which had a prominent social position in Yucatán since colonial times. He was the son of Raymundo Cámara Luján, a wealthy landowner and businessman. He studied medicine at the University of Berlin, graduating in 1896. During his career, he specialized in pediatrics and returned to Mérida, where he opened the first children's clinic on the Yucatán Peninsula. In 1909, together with Gonzalo Cámara Zavala, his cousin, he founded the Social Action League (Liga de Acción Social), a group of progressive landowners committed to improving the conditions of laborers on henequen haciendas in Yucatán and establishing rural schools for the Maya indigenous people. The League, influenced by the liberal and egalitarian principles of Rousseau and Pestalozzi, two Swiss intellectuals, founded the Model School (Escuela Modelo), which operates to this day in Mérida, Chetumal and Valladolid.

Cámara's liberal and democratic ideals aligned him with Francisco I. Madero, and he played a significant role in convincing the Yucatecan oligarchy, known as the divine caste, to support José María Pino Suárez during the 1911 gubernatorial election. Subsequently, when Pino Suárez assumed the vicepresidency of Mexico, Cámara succeeded him as governor of Yucatán before being elected to his own term. During his tenure, he faced challenges such as the Morenista rebellion and the dominance of the henequen industry by American capitalists. Cámara's efforts to regulate the henequen market through the Regulatory Commission were instrumental in protecting Mexican interests against foreign monopolies.

In February 1913, amidst the political turmoil in Mexico, Cámara was caught up in the Ten Tragic Days, a military coup d'état which toppled the Madero administration, the country's first democratically elected government. As the political persecution against the Madero, Pino, and Cámara families worsened under the Huerta military dictatorship, Cámara and his family decided to exile themselves abroad, eventually settling in Europe. Nevertheless, Nicolas continued to finance the armed rebellion against the dictatorship which was led in the Southeast of Mexico by his brother, Alfredo, the former governor of Quintana Roo, along with Manuel Castillo Brito, the former governor of Campeche. In July 1914, the Huerta régime collapsed.

He later also served as a diplomat, representing Mexico as consul-general in Berlin and Vienna during the interwar period. After many years abroad, he returned to Yucatán and played a key role as the chairman of the Henequen Regulatory Commission.

== Biography ==
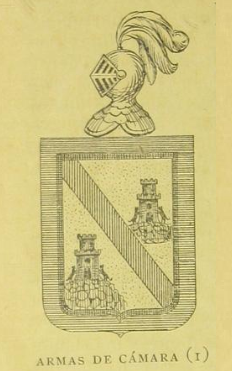
The Coat of Arms of the Cámara Family.

=== Family Origins ===
Born in Mérida, Yucatán on 25 April 1875, the eldest son of Raymundo Cámara Luján, a wealthy landowner and businessman who made a fortune during the henequen boom, and María del Carmen Vales Castillo. His maternal uncle was Agustín Vales Castillo, a Yucatecan industrialist and banker who served as the Mayor of Mérida between 1902 and 1907.

A member of the Pino-Cámara family, an old patrician family which could claim descent from several of the military commanders who had participated in Spanish Conquest of Yucatán. He was a direct-line descendant of Juan de la Cámara, the Spanish conquistador and nobleman who had been one of the founders of Mérida in 1542. He was also a descendant of Francisco de Montejo, Álvar Núñez Cabeza de Vaca, Gaspar and Melchor Pachecho, among others.

María Cámara Vales, his elder sister, earned the Belisario Domínguez Medal of Honor in 1969. Her husband, José María Pino Suárez served as Vice President of Mexico between 1911 and 1913.

Alfredo Cámara Vales, his younger brother, served as Governor of the Federal Territory of Quintana Roo.

Hortensia Cámara Vales, his younger sister, was a concert pianist. She married Pablo Castellanos León also a noted virtuoso pianist who studied at the Conservatoire de Paris under Antoine François Marmontel. Their son, Pablo Castellanos Cámara was also a distinguished virtuoso pianist who studied at the Paris and Berlin Conservatories under Alfred Cortot and Edwin Fischer, respectively. Nicolás was also the uncle of Fernando Cámara Barbachano, the distinguished anthropologist.

Alfredo Pino Cámara, another nephew, was a distinguished jurist, who served as associate justice of the Supreme Court of Justice of the Nation and was the judge responsible for instructing the famous murder case against Tina Modotti, the Italian communist photographer. Similarly, his grandnephew, Ismael Moreno Pino, was a lawyer and senior diplomat who served as Undersecretary of Foreign Affairs and was the Mexican Ambassador to Germany and the Netherlands.

=== Education ===
The eldest of thirteen siblings, the Cámara Vales brothers were educated in a household which emphasized learning music and foreign languages; he played the violin and piano and spoke fluent English, Spanish, French and German. He earned a Doctor of Medicine degree at the University of Berlin in Germany, graduating with the thesis "The Pellagra in Yucatán" (1896).

=== Marriage and Descendants ===
He married Joaquina Millet Heredia. She was the daughter of José María Millet Hübbe, a prosperous businessman of French, German and Danish origin, and Joaquina Heredia Cacaño. The couple had two sons and a daughter:

- Berta Cámara Millet
- Nicolás Cámara Millet
- Jorge Carlos Cámara Millet

== Public career ==
Having specialized in pediatrics in Berlin, Cámara returned to Mérida and opened the first children's hospital in the Yucatán peninsula.

In 1909, Cámara joined his cousin Gonzalo Cámara to establish the Social Action League (Liga de Acción Social), an organization made up of progressive landowners committed to improving the conditions of laborers on henequen haciendas in Yucatán and establishing rural schools. According to Gonzalo Cámara, the League was founded with the:

"imperative, transcendental, and urgent purpose of educating the Maya indigenous people of Yucatán. If education is to be declared not as a matter of utility but as a matter of public necessity, why is the indigenous person who resides on the haciendas excluded from the participation that every Yucatecan is entitled to in the right to education?"

The League gained significant influence in Yucatecan society in the early 20th century. By 1910, the League founded the Model School (Escuela Modelo), based on liberal, secular, and egalitarian principles, inspired by the ideas of two Swiss thinkers, Jean-Jacques Rousseau and Johann Heinrich Pestalozzi. The school continues to operate today in Mérida, Chetumal and Valladolid.

Cámara's liberal ideals identified him with Francisco I. Madero, a close friend of the Cámara family and of his brother-in-law, José María Pino Suárez. A member of the Progressive Constitutionalist Party, Cámara campaigned in his native state for the Maderista cause. During the 1911 gubernatorial election, Cámara was instrumental in convincing much of the Yucatecan oligarchy to transfer their allegiance to José María Pino Suárez, who won the governorship despite a tight race against Delio Moreno. The gubernatorial term of Pino Suárez was cut short, however, when he was elected to the vice-presidency of the Republic as a result of the 1911 presidential elections. After Pino Suárez resigned as governor, the state congress appointed Cámara as interim governor of Yucatán.

Within a month of assuming power, Cámara organized the 1912 local extraordinary elections. Deciding to stand as a candidate, he resigned from the governorship so as not to influence the outcome, being replaced by Agustín Patrón Correa. After winning a popular mandate in the elections, he returned to power.

During his tenure, he faced a rebellion led by Delio Moreno in the town of Opichén. Moreno, the nephew of Francisco Cantón, a former Yucatán governor, had run for the governorship against Pino Suárez in 1911. Despite his close ties to the old regime, Moreno had a strong following among the common people and incited them to rebel against the government. In January 1912, Cámara reported to the state congress that Moreno's followers (Morenistas):

"were unscrupulous agitators who, taking advantage of the ignorant credulity of field laborers, made them believe that the success of their cause depended on them becoming absolute owners of all lands and plantations, creating in them an agitation similar to what caused the Caste War in the past century."

The Morenista rebellion spread to Conkal, Maxcanú, and Temax but was quelled by the government. After the rebellion was defeated, Moreno went into exile from Yucatán, joining the anti-Maderist forces of Pascual Orozco and eventually supporting the coup d'état of February 1913, known as the Ten Tragic Days.

During Cámara's tenure, the Regulatory Commission for the Henequen Market (Reguladora) was established to organize the henequen industry in Yucatán and break the monopoly held by Olegario Molina and his cronies. Molina was a former governor of Yucatán and cabinet minister who had exploited his political connections to seize control of henequen exports since 1902.

During Yucatán's Gilded Age, which lasted roughly between 1870 and 1920, the henequen industry had transformed Yucatán into Mexico's wealthiest and most industrialized state. Henequen accounted for nearly twenty percent of Mexico's total exports and out of Yucatán's haciendas came 90% of the sacks and rope consumed internationally. Both goods were considered essential in the context of the Second Industrial Revolution and the naval arms races between the Great Powers as the world prepared for World War I. Henequen "crossed all borders. It was sold everywhere: binder twine in the United States; silk in Germany and henequen sacks throughout the Americas. In other words, it almost became an article of first necessity in the entire world." By 1900, Yucatán was exporting 81 million kilograms of henequen to the United States each year, roughly 178.5 million pounds priced at $9.48 USD per pound. Solely from their exports to the United States, henequen exporters were generating annual revenue for Yucatán of roughly $1.7 billion USD. Adjusted for inflation, this 1900 annual revenue would amount to approximately $62 billion USD in 2023.

In early 1902, the renowned American financier John Pierpont Morgan organized the merger of several American agricultural harvesting equipment companies to form the International Harvester Company (IH). After the merger, IH became the largest producer of binder twine, purchasing 80% of Yucatán's henequen. At that point, IH became price makers, not price takers.

By October of the same year, Molina met with Cyrus McCormick, the president of IH, in Havana. There, they concluded a secret pact in which the American conglomerate agreed to exclusively import henequen sold by Molina's company, acting as an intermediary between henequen plantation owners and the American markets. In return, Molina committed to "use all efforts within his power to depress the price of the sisal fiber" (henequen) and have McCormick "pay only those prices dictated from time to time by the I.H. Co." As a result of this secret agreement between McCormick and Molina, the price of henequen went from fluctuating around $9.48 USD per pound in the market to a fixed rate dictated by U.S. capitalists of only 8 cents per pound.

Molina and his American partners managed to reduce prices to the point where several Mexican producers were on the verge of bankruptcy. After the Panic of 1907, Molina's main competitors had been eliminated, including the Escalante exporting house, a family that had founded the Yucatecan henequen industry in the mid-19th century. Thebaud Brothers, a leading New York investment bank, that had financed the Escalantes also collapsed as a result. By 1910, Olegario Molina and Avelino Montes, his son-in-law, controlled more than 72% of the total henequen exports. It was, in effect, a monopoly established at the expense of Yucatecan producers and exporters.

The Reguladora, established in 1912, was initiated and designed by the Chamber of Agriculture, which represented Yucatecan producers themselves rather than the State. Its primary purpose was to safeguard Mexican interests and protect the local henequen industry against the influence of American capitalism, notably embodied by figures such as Olegario Molina in Yucatán:

"The Reguladora was the first attempt to regulate the market of an export product in Mexico. This proposal redefined the role of the state in the market, under the pressure of an organized group of producers. Ultimately, as a demonstration of their success as a lobbying group, in January 1912, the Maderist governor Nicolás Cámara Vales (1911-1913) created this state-directed commission, which aimed to raise international henequen prices through a fiber retention policy. The Reguladora also intended to intervene in fiber marketing by acting as a direct exporter, making it a competitor to the Molina-Montes monopoly and the International Harvester Company. The Reguladora was created based on a cash reserve, established by an extraordinary state export tax on henequen that the henequen growers accepted because it was their proposal. With the revenue, they intended to create an investment fund for the purchase of henequen directly from producers and its subsequent export without intermediaries through the commission. They aimed to continue the valorization program outlined by the agricultural chamber, as well as explore new alternative markets to the American one. The decree creating the Reguladora, presided over by Governor Nicolás Cámara Vales, is evidence of this because it establishes the Commission's goals, many of which were previously proposed by the agricultural chamber: to manage the defense of the henequen industry, raise and sustain the fiber's price to a level that is profitable for the producers, withhold the quantities of henequen it deems necessary from the market, and open new markets for the fiber trade. Additionally, the supernumerary members and the manager of the Reguladora were members of the agricultural chamber, confirming that the Chamber had penetrated the structure of the Reguladora."

By the end of 1917, the Reguladora, and not Molina, had more than 90% of henequen exports under its control. This was largely due to the efforts of General Salvador Alvarado starting in 1915.

A teetotaller, Cámara also founded a society to advocate for abstinence through the press, public meetings and anti-alcoholic literature. The society performed good service for a number of years but declined after the end of Cámara's tenure.

In January 1913, Cámara requested temporary leave from his position as governor to travel to Mexico City, being temporarily replaced by Fernando Solís León, the mayor of Mérida and a Maderist politician. Thus, Cámara was in the nation's capital, visiting his sister and brother-in-law, when he was caught up in the events of the Ten Tragic Days. On February 19, the Mexican government, led by president Madero, was overthrown in a military coup, replaced by general Victoriano Huerta. Subsequently, on February 22, Madero and Pino Suárez were assassinated on the orders of the military regime.

María, Cámara's sister, became a widow at the age of 35 with six underage children, the youngest being only a few months old. Given the climate of violence and political instability in the capital, the relatives of the fallen president and vice-president were in imminent danger. Days earlier, the private residence of the Madero family had been reduced to ruins by a devastating fire started by a group of Porfirian "aristocrats" sympathetic to Huerta's cause. Faced with this situation, the Madero family sought diplomatic asylum in the residence of the Japanese ambassador. Huerta's military officers, aware of this, threatened to burn the Japanese ambassadorial residence to the ground. With the protection of Manuel Márquez Sterling, the Cuban ambassador, the Madero family managed to embark for Havana before dispersing to various parts of the United States: New York, California, and Texas. Cámara Vales, in turn, decided to accompany his sister and nephews back to Mérida, where he believed they would be safer due to their family's influence and connections.

In Mérida, however, Solís León had recognized the Huertista dictatorship before being forced to resign from his position as interim governor. He was replaced by Arcadio Escobedo, a henequen plantation owner sympathetic to the Huertista dictatorship. Escobedo had been indirectly involved in the homicide of one of his mayan slaves in 1908, causing a scandal in Yucatecan society.

At that point, Cámara decided to travel with his family on a steamboat to Havana, under the protection of Márquez Sterling, before settling in Europe as a self-imposed exile. Nonetheless, Nicolas continued to provide financial support for the armed uprising against the dictatorship. This rebellion was spearheaded by his brother, Alfredo, who had previously served as the governor of Quintana Roo, and Manuel Castillo Brito, a former governor of Campeche. In July 1914, the Huerta regime came to an end.

Cámara Vales remained in Europe throughout the remainder of the Revolution. During the Interwar period, he held various positions in the diplomatic service, representing his country as Consul General in Berlin and Vienna. Finally returning to Yucatán after many years abroad, he served as the chairman of the Henequen Regulatory Commission. He died in Mexico City in 1956, aged 81.
