= Pablo Castellanos León =

Mexican pianist, conductor, and music teacher

Pablo Castellanos León (Mérida, Yucatán, September 27, 1860 – Paris, France, January 28, 1928) was a Mexican pianist, conductor, and music teacher who was a renowned classical musician focusing on the German and French traditions.

== Biography ==
He was born in Mérida Yucatán on September 27, 1860, the son of Pablo Castellanos y Rendón, a lawyer and politician who served as governor of Yucatán during the caste war, and Mercedes Rodríguez de León y Echazarre.

He began his music studies under José Jacinto Cuevas. In 1875, aged fifteen, he arrived in Mexico City, where he studied at the National Conservatory of Music under Melesio Morales. Due to his talent as a pianist, he continued his studies at the Conservatoire de Paris (1880–85), studying under Antoine François Marmontel, whose many distinguished pupils included Claude Debussy, Georges Bizet, and Edward MacDowell. His artistic personality was so prominent within the Paris Conservatoire that Marmontel praised his distinguished Mexican pupil in his book Silhouettes et Medaillons, Virtuoses Contemporaines (1887).

He returned to Mexico in 1885 accompanied by Juan Hernández Acevedo, the prominent Mexican flutist, with whom he had become friends in Paris. In Mexico City, he associated with Felipe Villanueva, Ricardo Castro, Gustavo E. Campa, and other distinguished Mexican musicians from the so-called "Group of Six", which transformed musical education in Mexico which, until then, had focused on the Italian musical tradition, embodied by his former tutor Melisio Morales, largely ignoring the German and French tradition. The Group published, promoted, and reproduced works by Johann Sebastian Bach, Frédéric Chopin, Franz Liszt and Anton Rubinstein which, until then, were disregarded by the Mexico City Conservatory.

In 1887, he was one of the founders of the "Campa-Hernández Acevedo Musical Institute", an establishment that promoted musical education in the country, and shortly thereafter returned to his native Mérida.

Upon his return, he wanted to revolutionize piano teaching in Yucatán, undertaking to translate Félix Richert's seminal work "L ' Art de jouer du piano suivant les lois de la nature" (1864) from the original French. Around that time he suffered an accident that impaired his use of his left hand, cutting short his brilliant musical career. He then dedicated himself to teaching and sponsoring talented pianists such as Ricardo Río Díaz and José Rubio Milán.

After the Mexican Revolution, he went into exile in the United States and Europe. He died in Paris, France on January 28, 1928.

=== Personal life ===
In 1903 he married Hortensia Cámara Vales, also a renowned pianist and daughter of Raymundo Cámara Luján, the business magnate and head of the Cámara family. He was the brother-in-law of José María Pino Suárez, vice president of Mexico, and brother-in-law of Alfredo and Nicolás Cámara Vales, governor of Quintana Roo and Yucatán, respectively. His nephew by marriage was Alfredo Pino Cámara, associate justice of the Supreme Court of Justice of the Nation. He was the granduncle of Ismael Moreno Pino, ambassador and undersecretary of Foreign Affairs and Fernando Cámara Barbachano, the noted social anthropologist.

His only son was Pablo Castellanos Cámara, a distinguished pianist who graduated from the Paris and Berlin conservatories where he studied under Alfred Cortot and Edwin Fischer, respectively.
