= Fernando Cámara Barbachano =

Mexican anthropologist

- Born: April 17, 1919; Mérida, Yucatán, Mexico
- Died: December 30, 2007 (aged 88); Mexico City, Mexico
- Education: University of Chicago; National School of Anthropology and History
- Occupations: anthropologist; museologist; ethnologist

Fernando Cámara Barbachano (Mérida, Yucatán, April 17, 1919 – Mexico City, December 30, 2007) was an academic, museologist, ethnologist, and social anthropologist who was the founder and director of the Yucatecan Institute of Anthropology. Likewise, he was deputy director of both the National Institute of Anthropology and History (INAH) and the National School of Anthropology and History (ENAH).

== Biography ==
Family Origins

Born into a landowning family in Mérida, Yucatán on April 17, 1919, he was the son of Hernán Cámara Vales and Jacinta Barbachano Bolio.

The Cámara family is a well-known family in the Yucatán whose origins can be traced to the Spanish conquest of Yucatán in the 16th century. His grandfather was Raymundo Cámara Luján, a prominent businessman closely linked to the Yucatecan oligarchy. His great-uncle, Agustín Vales Castillo, was also a business magnate who served as mayor of Mérida between 1902 and 1908. His relatives include several prominent politicians. His aunt, María Cámara Vales, was the wife of José María Pino Suárez, vice-president of Mexico. Likewise, his uncles Alfredo and Nicolás Cámara Vales served as governors of Quintana Roo and Yucatán, respectively.

His maternal family, the Barbachano clan, is also well known in Mérida. Doña Jacinta was the great-niece of Miguel Barbachano y Terrazo, the liberal politician who served five terms as governor of Yucatán and was president of the Second Republic of Yucatán which seceded from Mexico between 1841 and 1848. Although he was a staunch proponent of Yucatecan independence, he was forced to end the Yucatecan secession due to the Caste War, an ethnic conflict between the indigenous Mayan peoples and the Criollo people. Another member of the family, Fernando Barbachano Peón, was a prominent hotel businessman who is remembered for developing the tourism industry in the Yucatán peninsula.

Education

Cámara Barbachano belonged to the second generation of students at the National School of Anthropology and History (ENAH), earning his B.A. in 1940. Afterward, he obtained an M.A. and a Ph.D. in Anthropology from the University of Chicago (1950) with a doctoral thesis titled: "Persistence and cultural change among Tzeltals of the Chiapas Highlands: Comparative study of the religious and political institutions of the Municipalities of Tenejapa and Oxchue." In 1966, his thesis was published into a book.

Along with Ricardo Pozas Arciniega and Calixta Guiteras Holmes, he belonged to a distinguished generation of Mexican anthropologists that had studied at ENAH under Sol Tax, a prominent American anthropologist who was a tenured professor at the University of Chicago. It was under Tax's influence that Cámara Barbachano continued his studies in Chicago under the supervision of Robert Redfield.

Career

Returning from Chicago, he settled in Mexico City. Between 1954 and 1957, he was deputy director of the National School of Anthropology and History (ENAH) being the founder of the specialty of social anthropology with which he began the training of specialists in applied anthropology. Cámara Barbachano also established the conceptual, technical, and ethical bases on which this discipline is developed today in Mexico and a large part of Latin America.

In 1958, he was the founder and director of the Yucatecan Institute of Anthropology.

Between 1962 and 1964, he was curator of the ethnography rooms of the National Museum of Anthropology and head of Ethnography at the same museum (1971 – 1977).

Between 1971 and 1977, he also served as deputy director of the National Institute of Anthropology and History (INAH).

In 1985, he was recognized as an INAH emeritus researcher and in 2001 he was honored by the INAH academic community for more than 60 years of service.

Throughout his life he contributed to the production and dissemination of anthropological knowledge in different fields of research, dissemination and teaching both at the ENAH and at the INAH, and particularly at the National Museum of Anthropology. Internationally, he conducted research in Ecuador, Peru, Puerto Rico and the United States. His work was reflected in 81 publications, more than 100 presentations, 50 consultancies and 400 conferences; 53 of which he taught at various North American universities such as those of New York, Wisconsin, Michigan and California, as well as those of the Dominican Republic, Panama, Barcelona and Seville.

Cámara Barbachano died in Mexico City on December 30, 2007, at the age of 88.

== Selected bibliography ==
- Cámara Barbachano, Fernando et al. Musée National d'Anthropologie de Mexico. Paris, France: A. Somogy, 1969. OCLC 335241
- Cámara Barbachano, Fernando. Persistencia y cambio cultural entre tzeltales de los altos de Chiapas: estudio comparativo de las instituciones religiosas y políticas de los Municipios de Tenejapa y Oxchuc. Mexico: Escuela Nacional de Antropología e Historia, Sociedad de Alumnos, 1966. OCLC 1822820
- Cámara Barbachano, Fernando. Colonización Interna en Yucatán. Mérida, Yucatán, México: Instituto Yucateco de Antropología e Historia, 1958. OCLC 3208834
- Cámara Barbachano, Fernando. Chacaltianguis comunidad rural en la ribera del Papaloapan. México: Gobierno del Estado de Veracruz, 1952. OCLC 35821763
- Cámara Barbachano, Fernando. Monografía de los tzotziles de San Miguel Mitontic. Chicago, Illinois: University of Chicago Library, 1945. OCLC 1357424005
