= Agustín Vales Castillo =

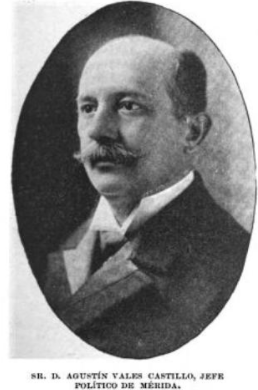

Mayor of Mérida
- In office 1902–1908

Personal details
- Born: Agustín Vales Castillo; 1857 Mérida, Yucatán, Mexico
- Died: 1938 (aged 78–79) Mérida, Yucatán, Mexico
- Party: Liberal Party
- Spouse: María Cristina Millet Hübbe
- Children: 3
- Parent(s): Agustín Vales (father); María de Castillo Dafrota (mother)
- Education: Instituto Literario de Yucatán

Agustín Vales Castillo (1857 – 1938) was a Mexican businessman, banker, industrialist, landowner, philanthropist, and liberal politician who served as prefect of Mérida (jefe político) during the governorship of Olegario Molina. He emerged as a prominent figure during the heyday of the henequen industry in Yucatan due to his influence in business and political circles during the Porfiriato era.

During his tenure as the prefect of Mérida, between 1902 and 1908, Vales promoted various important public works for the city that were recognized nationally and internationally. During Porfirio Díaz's visit to Mérida, the president praised the impeccable and modern state of the city, considering it a suitable place for investment and economic growth. Furthermore, the glowing description of Mérida by British writers Frederick Frost and Channing Arnold supports the city's reputation at that time as a clean, modern, and prosperous place. While Vales is recognized for his contribution to Mérida's development, his government was also characterized by authoritarian and paternalistic actions.

During the Mexican Revolution, there was a shift in political power in Yucatán, and many elite families joined Maderism, led in the southeast by José María Pino Suárez, who was related to Vales by marriage. During that period, Vales aligned himself with Maderism and maintained close business relations with the Madero family. For example, in 1912, Vales partnered with Ernesto Madero Farías, uncle of President Francisco I. Madero, to establish the Compañía Harinera del Golfo, S.A., which became the main flour supplier in the Yucatán Peninsula.

Throughout the 20th century, the Vales family continued to position themselves as a prominent business dynasty in southeastern Mexico, with Agustín Vales Millet expanding the empire established by his father. Their ventures included the creation of The Yucatan Bank, the industrialization of Yucatecan plywood, a monopoly in the bottling and distribution of Coca-Cola, and the distribution of Volkswagen vehicles in the Yucatán Peninsula.

== Family ==
Born in Mérida, Yucatán in 1857, his parents were Agustín Vales, a businessman and landowner born in Galicia, Spain, and María Castillo, born in Mérida.

The Castillos, his maternal family, was a distinguished clan of landowners who had come to Yucatán since the viceregal period. During that time, they were repeatedly able to prove they descended from the Spanish nobility (hidalgura), then a requisite to holding public office. According to Valdés Acosta, "those of this lineage proved their descent from Cornelius the Centurion," the first gentile to convert to Christianity, and “their ancestral home (solar) in the Burgos Mountains is one of the most distinguished” in Spain.

María del Carmen Vales Castillo, his sister, married Raymundo Cámara, head of the Cámara family, one of the principal patrician families of Yucatán. Through this marriage, Agustín Vales was related to several prominent Maderista politicians in the Yucatán Peninsula. Two of his nephews supported the antireelectionist cause: Alfredo and Nicolás Cámara Vales served as governor of Quintana Roo and Yucatán, respectively. Meanwhile, María Cámara Vales, his niece, married José María Pino Suárez, who served as vice-president of Mexico

== Career ==
Before assuming the position of prefect of Mérida, Agustín Vales had already distinguished himself as a prominent businessman. It is mentioned that Olegario Molina, governor of Yucatán, selected him for the position due to his reputation as a "man of energy, integrity, talent, and knowledge of the environment in which he would operate." Additionally, other sources describe him as a "skilled and audacious promoter of economic progress."

It is noteworthy that governor Molina, a member of the Liberal Party, chose Agustín Vales despite his sympathy for the Conservative Party in the previous administration. During that time, a group of conservative businessmen was created including Vales, Eusebio Escalante, and Raymundo Cámara, who had supported the newly elected conservative governor, general Francisco Cantón.

During his tenure as prefect, Agustín Vales promoted several public works such as city paving and drainage systems, the construction of a Lunatic asylum and the expansion of the Penitentiary. He also played a fundamental role in the founding of the Hospital Agustín O'Harán in Mérida, recognized to this day as one of the best hospitals in the country. Vales made a significant personal donation for the creation of the hospital, along with other benefactors, including Leandro Ayala and members of the Molina family.

In February 1906, when Porfirio Díaz visited Mérida, he was received at an elegant reception at Vales' residence. Díaz was positively impressed by the progress achieved in Mérida during Vales' administration, describing the city as impeccable and modern, a suitable place for the great capital generated in Yucatán. With Vales in charge of the political leadership, Mérida flourished, its streets scientifically, paved with macadam, illuminated at night with electric lamps, and traversed during the day by modern trams, all before Mexico City. In those years, Frederick Frost and Channing Arnold, two British writers who visited, described the capital of the state:

"Merida was magically perfect, completely different from any other Spanish-American city one could imagine. Merida is such a clean city that it is astonishing. The henequen millionaires are so wealthy that they really do not know what to do with their money... and they came up with the idea of modernizing the city. It took four years (1902-1906) and the result is perfection. From north to south, from east to west, the streets, both side streets and main avenues, extend along the three-mile width of the city, with a surface as smooth as glass and as clean as marble. As we effortlessly walked from street to street, observing well-constructed and harmonious houses, we rubbed our eyes and wondered if we had arrived in a land where every day was cleaning day. The people passing by in carriages, the police officers on the corner with their elegant Holland uniforms, and the merchants at the doors of their stores... all had an impeccable appearance that defied description. The splendor of the city had a mesmerizing effect that almost convinced us that we had arrived in Utopia."

While he is recognized for his contribution to the development of Mérida, authoritarian actions are also attributed to his government: he attempted to prevent the growth of syndicalism and is mentioned to have promoted hygienist policies such as the prohibition of alcoholic beverages and the closure of taverns in the city.

His close association with Olegario Molina was not limited to politics; he also partnered with him in various enterprises related to the exploitation of henequen.

Additionally, along with the Cámara Ancona brothers, he owned Hacienda Chenkú, one of the most prominent estates in Yucatán and an important fiber producer in the context of the booming henequen industry.

Associated with his brother-in-law Raymundo Cámara and Eusebio Escalante, Agustín Vales founded the Cuyo Agricultural Company, although he only held a minority interest.This company employed over fifteen hundred workers and controlled an extensive property of 2,627 square kilometers in the northwest area of Yucatán (roughly the size of Rhode Island) which was "crossed by 168 km of its own telephone lines, an animal-drawn Decauville line with 60 platforms and 500 mules, a broad-gauge railway with 12 platforms and a locomotive, a 167-m-wide dock and even a 500-ton steamship." The estate had abundant resources such as trees for obtaining dyes, land suitable for cultivating sugarcane, vanilla, tobacco, corn, and cereals, as well as areas suitable for salt production. It was also known for the exploitation of forest resources, including valuable woods used in cabinetmaking and construction, as well as the extraction of gum. Additionally, they cultivated products such as cocoa, cotton, bananas, and vanilla. The company exported dye wood to European markets in Hamburg, Le Havre, and Liverpool, where it was used in the textile industry. As for gum, its main destination was New York, with an average annual commercialization of 400,000 kilograms.

In 1906, Agustín Vales, along with his son Agustín Vales Millet, founded the Mérida Chamber of Commerce and held the presidency of the organization at the time.

Vales also stood out in the banking and finance sector. He was one of the founding partners and a member of the first board of directors of Banco Yucateco, S.A., an entity that competed with Banco Mercántil de Yucatán, S.A. The former bank was composed of entrepreneurs aligned with the interests of Olegario Molina, while the latter was backed by entrepreneurs close to Eusebio Escalante Castillo and Raymundo Cámara. In 1937, shortly before his death, Vales also founded Banco Mercantil de Tampico, S.A. and Sociedad Financiera Mercantil, S.A.

With the triumph of the Maderista Revolution in May 1911, Porfirio Díaz and his cabinet resigned. Olegario Molina, after resigning as secretary of Commerce and Industry, was forced to exile in Havana, Cuba. Despite losing his political power, Molina attempted to continue influencing the peninsula's economy through frontmen. During this time, Vales aligned himself with Maderism, a political movement led in the southeast of the country by José María Pino Suárez, who was his nephew-in-law.

"Pino Suárez won over the majority of the families from the economic elite of the state to Maderism. The followers of Molina switched to Maderism, as did the former 'liberal' supporters of former governor Carlos Peón, who had been politically inactive since the crisis of 1897 [...] The Cámara, Medina, Vales, Espejo, Castellanos, Escalante, Manzanilla, and Peniche families all switched to the Pino Suárez camp."

He maintained close business ties with the Madero family, an influential lineage of industrialists from Coahuila, who, at the dawn of the 20th century, was among the five wealthiest families in the country and provided financial support to the Mexican Revolution against dictator Porfirio Díaz. In 1912, in partnership with Ernesto Madero Farías, secretary of the Treasury and uncle of president Francisco I. Madero, Vales founded the Compañía Harinera del Golfo, S.A. which for many years was the main flour supplier in the Yucatán Peninsula. It is important to highlight that, influenced by Vales, Olegario Molina also aligned himself with the revolutionary cause:

"When Molina officially handed over the reins of his exporting business to his son-in-law, Avelino Montes in 1905, the price of henequen fiber had been around 15.4 cents per kilogram; however, by 1911, it had plummeted to 6.6 cents, lower than the figure of 9.9 to 8.8 cents that Molina had proposed as healthy for the industry. In early 1913, Molina openly criticized the harmful monopoly of International Harvester and supported the cooperative efforts of growers, through the Henequen Market Regulatory Commission, to break the control of American trusts. Then, when Huerta overthrew Madero [...], Molina began to act in support of Venustiano Carranza. It appears likely that he now saw the Carrancistas, with their pronounced nationalist ideology, as a means to free the Yucatecans from the informal empire that the International Harvester had previously consolidated with his help. In retrospect, Molina 'may have been the only Porfirian Cientifico who supported a revolutionary faction during the Mexican Revolution.' Several relatives and close associates of Molina, especially the Rendón and the Vales families, would play important roles in Governor Alvarado's economic management. Harvester did not show great concern over Molina's defection in the early 1910s, nor did they have difficulties finding a replacement. The logical substitute was Avelino Montes."

Throughout the 20th century, the Vales family remained one of the most important business families in the southeast of Mexico. Agustín Vales Millet, inherited and expanded the business empire that his father had built. In 1934, along with Alfonso Ponce Cámara and other prominent entrepreneurs, he founded Banco de Yucatán, S.A. (as a successor to the former bank of the same ) and served as Vice chairman of the board of directors on several occasions. He was also the chairman of Compañía Harinera Peninsular, S.A., and president of the Mérida Chamber of Commerce. Along with his sons, he developed the La Chiquita sawmill, among other companies.

In the early 1940s, Vales Millet founded Compañía Industrial Maderera S.A., which industrialized mahogany and fine-scented hardwood and sold plywood worldwide. After Industrias Madereras Unidas, S.A. (MUSA), led by Raymundo Cámara Peón, the Vales family became the main producers of plywood on the peninsula. The business thrived until the mid-1970s when Japanese technicians succeeded in producing plywood with soft woods from Indonesia, which had the same appearance and similar resistance as Yucatecan plywood but could be sold at half the price. In partnership with the Ponce family, the Vales also held a monopoly on the distribution and bottling of Coca-Cola in the Yucatan Peninsula, which they had acquired from the Pino family. By the late 1940s, Embotelladora Peninsular, S.A. had started producing a new soft drink under its own brand, Cristal, with flavors of black cider, barley, orange, and mineral water. In 1962, also in partnership with the Ponce family, the Vales obtained the distribution rights for Volkswagen cars in the peninsula. Similarly, in 1946, the Ponce and Vales families founded Agencias Mercantiles, S.A., specializing in the distribution of International Harvester trucks.

== Personal life ==
On July 24, 1879, he married María Cristina Millet Hübbe, daughter of José María Millet Aragón and María Cristina Hübbe García Rejón. The couple had the following offspring:

1. Maria Vales Millet married to Adolfo Casares
2. Agustín Vales Millet married to Mercedes Guerra
3. Carlos Vales Millet married to Rosa Cámara

== Casa Vales ==
He was the owner of Casa Vales, a neoclassical-style mansion on Paseo de Montejo that has been described as "one of the architectural treasures that bear witness to the economic splendor that the Yucatecan capital achieved in the early 20th century." The mansion was built in 1908 and was acquired by Vales in 1914. Eventually, he bequeathed it to Carlos Vales Millet, his son, and Rosa Cámara, his daughter-in-law, as a wedding gift. The eldest son of the Vales Cámara marriage was the last descendant to enjoy the mansion before the family decided to sell it to Grupo Financiero Santander in 1995.
