= María Cámara Vales =

Mexican educator

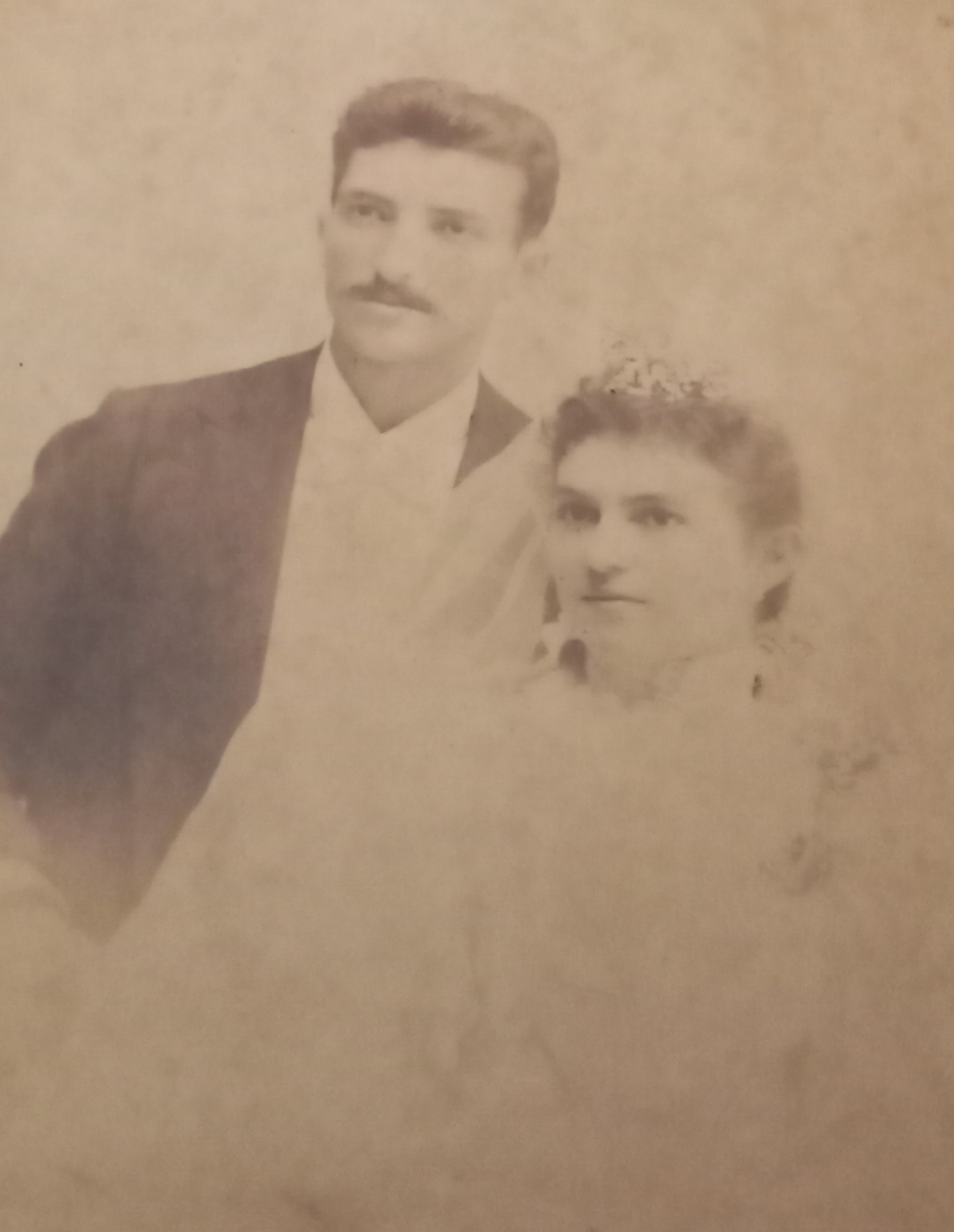
- María Cámara Vales and José María Pino Suárez on the day of their marriage (1896)

Second Lady of Mexico
- In office 1911–1913
- President: Francisco I. Madero

Personal details
- Born: March 4, 1877 Mérida, Yucatán, Mexico
- Died: April 14, 1970 (aged 93) Mexico City
- Political party: Independent
- Spouse: José María Pino Suárez
- Children: 6
- Parent(s): Raymundo Cámara Luján (father); María del Cármen Vales Castillo (mother)
- Relatives: Pino-Cámara Family; Agustín Vales Castillo (uncle); Ismael Moreno Pino (grandson)
- Profession: Educator
- Awards: Belisario Domínguez Medal of Honor

María Casimira Cámara Vales (March 4, 1877 – April 14, 1970) was an educator who served as the second lady of Mexico from 1911 to 1913 as the wife of Vice President José María Pino Suárez. Prior to that, she held the position of first lady of Yucatán in 1911. In recognition of her role during the tumultuous times of the Mexican Revolution, she was awarded the Belisario Domínguez Medal, the highest honor conferred by the Mexican Senate, in 1969. She was only the third woman to be awarded with the accolade.

== Early life: childhood and education ==
María Casimira was born on March 4, 1877, in Mérida, Yucatán. She was the second child among fourteen siblings born to Raymundo Cámara Luján and María del Carmen Vales Castillo. The Cámara family had a long history in the region, dating back to the Spanish conquest, and had held significant landholdings since the early colonial period.

Her father, Raymundo Cámara, was a prominent figure in the economic development of Yucatán during the late 19th and early 20th centuries. He was a businessman, banker, landowner, and philanthropist who owned numerous haciendas and was actively involved in henequen and sugar cane production. He was also one of the founding partners of the Mercantile Bank of Yucatán in 1890.

Her maternal uncle was Agustín Vales Castillo, a Yucatecan industrialist and banker, who served as the mayor of Mérida. Meanwhile, two of her siblings Nicolás and Alfredo Cámara Vales achieved prominent political careers as governors of Yucatán and Quintana Roo, respectively.

María was baptized in the sanctuary of the Cathedral of San Ildefonso in Mérida. Her devoutly Catholic family gave her the middle name Casimira as she was born on the feast day of Saint Casimir, a royal prince of Poland and a patron saint known for his piety and devotion. Casimira derives from the ancient Germanic word "Kazimierz", meaning "the one who brings balance and harmony."

Growing up, María was distinguished by her petite stature and striking blue eyes. Alongside her artistic talents in playing the piano and flute, she showcased exceptional skills in crafts and sewing. At the age of fourteen, she completed her education at Duarte College, graduating with commendation as an elementary teacher.

== Marriage, family, and children ==
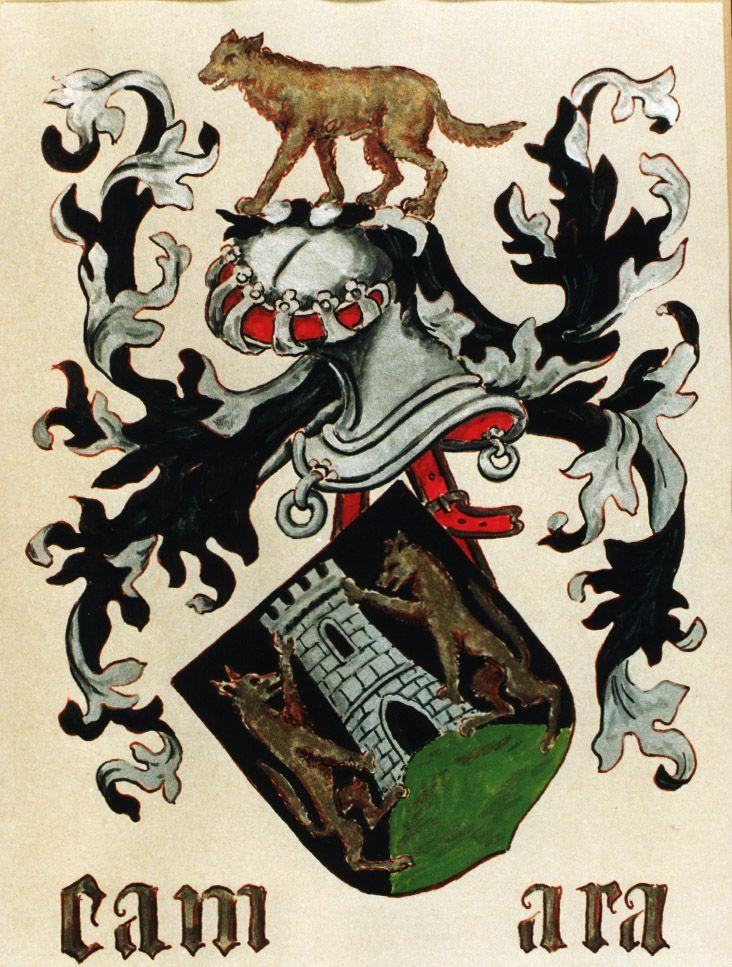
Coat of Arms of the Cámara Family

In 1893, María met José María Pino Suárez, a promising young law student known for his great intellect. Their paths crossed during a Carnival celebration, where María participated as part of an allegorical float representing the Greek goddess Themis. José María immediately fell deeply in love with her and dedicated various poems to María. However, their courtship faced challenges due to the social conventions of the time and the barrier created by the Cámara family.

During a three-year courtship, José María completed his studies and became a lawyer. On September 8, 1896, he married María Casimira, creating a deeply cherished union. José María was 27 years old at the time, while María was 19.

The couple went on to have six children: Maria, Alfredo, José, Aída, Hortensia, and Cordelia. Both Alfredo and José followed in their father's footsteps and excelled in the legal profession. Alfredo became an Associate Justice of the Supreme Court and gained recognition for his involvement in high-profile criminal proceedings.

Her daughters made notable marriages. María and Hortensia married into the Ponce family, known for their involvement in the brewing industry. In her second marriage to José González Sada, María became connected to the Madero and Garza Sada families, two of the wealthiest families in the country. Meanwhile, Cordelia married into the Escalante family, associated with the henequen industry.

== The Mexican Revolution ==
After establishing themselves in Mexico City, José María practiced law in a firm he co-founded with Joaquín Casasús, while María focused on nurturing their home and family. Eventually, they returned to Mérida, where José María partnered with María's father in various business ventures, accumulating enough capital to establish the prestigious newspaper, El Peninsular. The publication gained notoriety for its bold critique of working conditions for henequen workers and the authoritarian regime of Porfirio Díaz, earning opposition from the regional oligarchy. Eventually, the government compelled Pino Suárez to sell the newspaper to Nicolás and Raymundo Cámara Vales, María's brothers.

María's life took a dramatic turn with the arrival of Francisco Ignacio Madero González, the visionary founder of the Antireelectionist Party and later the President of Mexico. During Madero's visit to Yucatán in 1909, a genuine and loyal friendship blossomed between him and José María.

In November 1910, the Mexican Revolution erupted, and Madero issued the Plan of San Luis Potosí, denouncing fraudulent elections and calling for armed resistance. Pino Suárez joined the revolution from exile in Tabasco but faced setbacks in his attempt to invade the Yucatán Peninsula. Concerned about alarming news reports, including Madero's exile to the United States and rumors of harsh measures against Madero's supporters in Yucatán, María sent her family to her sister's home in San Juan Bautista, Tabasco.

Shortly after their arrival, a government official delivered confidential instructions to arrest Pino and send him back to Mexico. María made a daring decision to defend her husband. Leaving her children in her sister's care, she boarded a ship with the intention of reaching her husband before the officials could. Coincidentally, she ended up sharing the journey with the military officials assigned to arrest her husband.

Despite her anguish, María devised a plan. The ship made daytime stops at various riverside towns to load and unload cargo, sailing at night. During the first stop, María disembarked and managed to obtain a horse. She sent the horse with a message that would save her husband. As the ship continued its journey and reached Montecristo, the head of the military escort discovered that Pino had successfully left Hacienda Chablé where he was staying. María returned to San Juan Bautista accompanied by the disappointed soldiers, knowing that her husband had got her message.

Forced to leave the country, Pino Suárez went into exile in Texas, where he further strengthened his friendship with Gustavo Madero. He later became a peace commissioner, negotiating the Treaty of Ciudad Juárez in 1911, which led to the overthrow of Porfirio Díaz's regime. Afterward, José María Pino Suárez served as the governor of Yucatán.

== Second Lady of Mexico ==
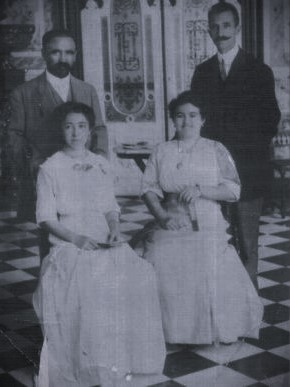
The Madero and Pino-Cámara families at the Chapultepec Castle.

In 1911, Pino Suárez was elected as the vice president of Mexico under President Francisco I. Madero. As the wife of the vice president, María assumed the role of the second lady of Mexico prompting her to relocate to the capital city to offer unwavering support to her husband. However, their time in office was marked by political turmoil and the Mexican Revolution.

In October 1912, they welcomed their sixth child, Cordelia, who was baptized at Chapultepec Castle, the presidential residence. President Madero and Sara Peréz de Madero, the First Lady, served as her godparents.

The true test of María's dedication came during the Ten Tragic Days when the Madero administration was overthrown in a military coup d’état. Despite her impassioned pleas for José María to flee, he remained steadfastly loyal to Madero. Tragically, on February 18, 1913, both Madero and Pino Suárez were apprehended at the National Palace.

Detained in narrow, dark, and poorly ventilated rooms, Madero and Pino Suárez endured neglect and mistreatment. María experienced hours of anguish and despair. On the morning of February 20, with the help of a friend, she managed to bypass a guard and briefly visited her husband. The visit was filled with intense emotion but abruptly ended due to a change of guard. María had to leave the place abruptly and was treated disrespectfully. The following morning, accompanied by Sara Pérez de Madero, she attempted, in vain, to overcome the resistance of the guards but had to leave without even catching a glimpse of their respective husbands.

That night, María received a letter from her husband asking her to bring their children to the train station at night. They were promised safe passage to Veracruz and then onward to Havana on the cruiser Cuba, arranged by the Cuban Ambassador Manuel Márquez Sterling. Filled with hope, María and her children arrived at the station early in the morning. However, they learned at 2 a.m. that the train would not be allowed to depart.

Returning home, exhausted from the wait, everyone fell asleep except María, who experienced a terrible hallucination in a state between sleep and wakefulness. In her semiconscious state, she saw a young newsboy waving a copy, announcing the deaths of Madero and Pino Suárez. Terrified, she screamed, and those in the house gathered around her as she recounted her tragic vision. Upon waking up, her first act was to ask for a newspaper to be bought, thus confirming that her dream had turned into a devastating reality: Madero and Pino Suárez had fallen victim to an assassin's bullet in the early hours of the day on the instruction of Victoriano Huerta, the military dictator. María, haunted by her prophetic dream, was in a state of profound shock and experienced a diabetic attack due to her immense grief.

After the assassination, she wanted to go to the morgue to identify her husband's body, but was convinced by family and friends that she should not "suffer the torture of seeing him." It was Alfredo Pino Cámara, her eldest son, then only a fourteen-year-old teenager, who had the task of "examining with horror the swollen features of his father and the strip of cardboard, bound by a bandage, that held the dismembered skull together." According to the autopsy report, Pino Suárez died of thirteen penetrating gunshot wounds to his skull. When María became a widow, aged 35, her oldest daughter, also named María, was 14-years-old while Cordelia, the youngest one, was only a few months old.

As a widow responsible for her young children, María Casimira sought solace and support from her extended family upon returning to Mérida. Eventually, their resilience and sacrifice were acknowledged when she received a modest pension from the government of Venustiano Carranza.

== Melisario Domínguez Medal of Honor ==
In recognition of María Cámara's unwavering spirit and strength, she was bestowed with the Belisario Domínguez Medal in 1969. This prestigious honor, the highest conferred by the Mexican Senate, served as a testament to her exceptional character and profound contributions. In her humble acceptance speech, María Casimira stated, "It is an honor to receive this esteemed medal, but the true honor resided in being the wife of José María Pino Suárez."

== Death ==
María died peacefully on April 14, 1970, sixty years after the Mexican Revolution began. She was 93 years old. Alongside her children Alfredo, María de González, Aída de Moreno, Hortensia de Ponce, and Cordelia de Escalante, María's funeral was attended by other relatives and friends, including Carlos Loret de Mola, the governor of Yucatán. She was laid to rest at the French cemetery of La Piedad. Her legacy lived on through her children, eleven grandchildren, thirty great-grandchildren, and four great-great-grandchildren.

== Awards ==
- Belisario Domínguez Medal of Honor of the Mexican Senate (1969)
