= Hacienda Chenkú =

- Private Residence
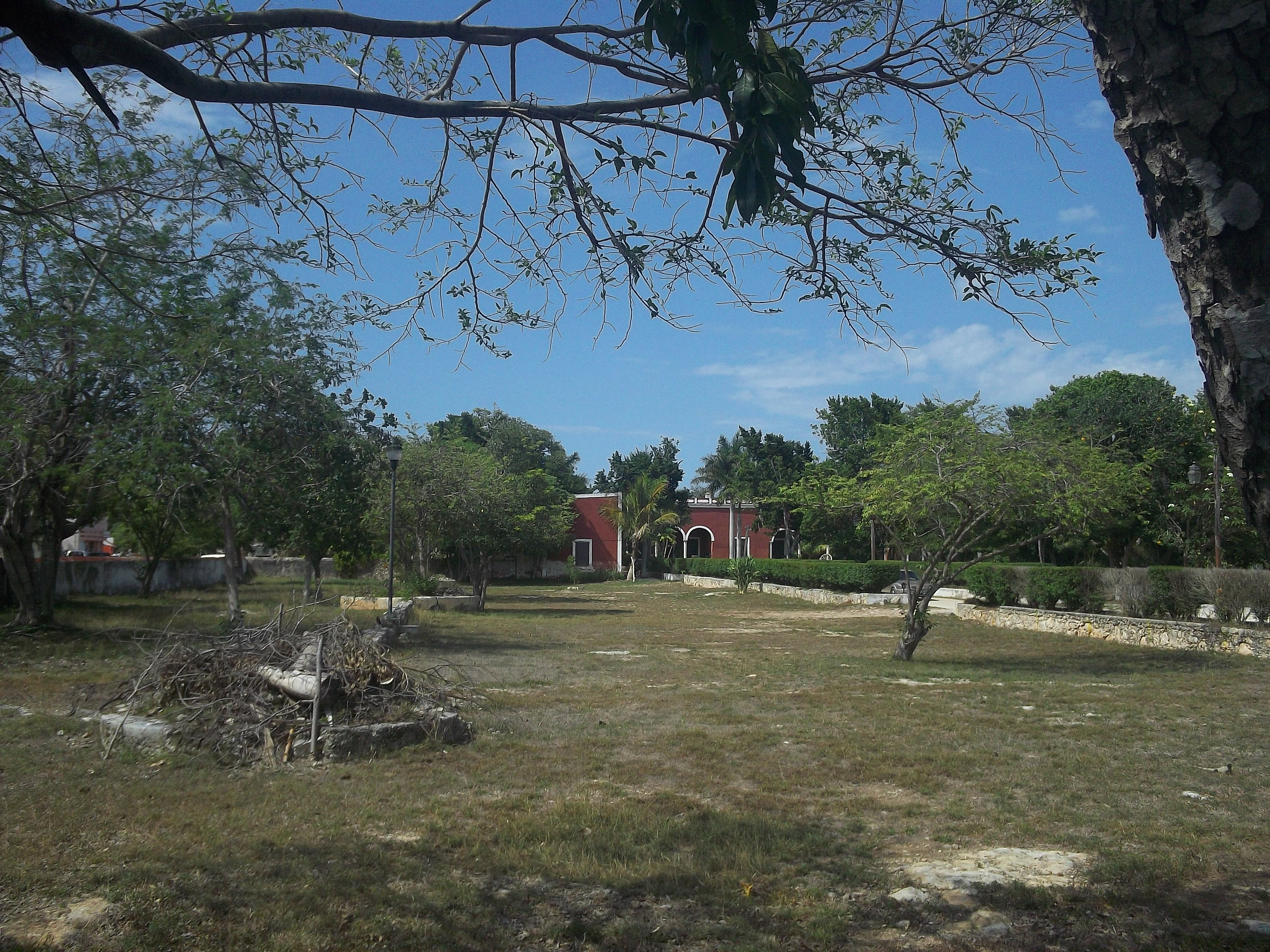
- Entrance Hacienda Chenkú, Yucatán

- Location in Mexico
- Coordinates: 21°00′33″N 89°38′53″W
- Country: Mexico
- Mexican States: Yucatán
- Municipalities: Mérida Municipality
- Time zone: UTC−6 (CST)
  - Summer (DST): UTC−5 (CDT)
- Postal code: 97219
- Area code: 999

Hacienda Chenkú is a hacienda in Mérida Municipality, Yucatán, Mexico. It is one of the properties that arose during the nineteenth century henequen boom. One of the first records of its ownership was to a Captain José Ignacio Rivas Chacón in 1788. The American archaeologist Sylvanus Morley occupied the home in the 1940s.

== Toponymy ==
The name Chenkú is from the Mayan language meaning the "well of god", as "chen" means well and "ku" means god.

== How to get there ==
The property is near the northeastern side of the Circuito Colonias in the Colonia (neighborhood) of San Vicente Chuburna on Calle 27 between Calle 30 and 36.

== History ==
Chenkú is first described in 1710 when it is described as a place near an Indian village in the parish of Chuburna where cattle and beehives were kept. In 1788 it became property of Captain José Ignacio Rivas Chacón.

In April, 1903 a fifth of the original property was sold by Idelfonso Gutierrez to Alberto Ancona Cámara. Candelaria Escalante de Duarte and her son Ignacio Duarte Escalante bought the remainder of the hacienda from Fernando García Fajardo, Agustín Vales Castillo, Alberto Ancona Cámara, Idelfonso Gutiérrez and Nicanor Ancona Cámara. In 1908, the Peninsular Banco Mexicano SA bought Chenkú and Santa Rosa Buenavista at public auction to settle a mortgage judgment against Ignacio Duarte Escalante.

In 1913 the property was acquired from the bank by Vicenta Castilla Molina, who transferred it to her children in 1923 along with 14 other rural properties and 4 properties within the city. In 1924 the children, Ignacio and Rosario Molina Castilla exchanged several properties but each retained half interest in Chenkú, but in 1925, Rosario took full possession of the property from her brother. In 1933, 1939, and 1949 the property was reduced to provide for the ejido of Chuburná. Chenkú, like the other henequen plantations, ceased to exist as an autonomous community with the agrarian land reform implemented by President Lazaro Cardenas in 1937. His decree turned the haciendas into collective ejidos, leaving only 150 hectares to the former landowner for his use as private property.

Sylvanus G. Morley lived in the property from the end of 1940 until 1948. During this time frame, he was carrying out expeditions in other parts of Yucatán and making trips to and from the United States. His last visit to Chenkú was in May, 1948, shortly before his death.

Rosario Molina Castilla sold the property to her brother Luis G. Molina Castilla and his wife, Gelitzli Carrillo Palma (daughter of Felipe Carrillo Puerto) in 1949. They in turn sold it to Alicia Vega de Molina, who 3 years later re-sold it to Gelitzli Carrillo Palma and her daughter Elda E. Molina Carrillo. In 1954, the State Congress renamed the estate "Chenkú de Morley", in honor of Sylvanus Morely, who had done so much archeological work in the state and written books about Yucatán.

In 1965 the property was owned by José Guy Puerto y Puerto, José María Palomeque Cosgaya y Humberto Rodríguez Perera. When Puerto y Puerto died María Luisa Puerto Espinosa de Ancona, José Guy Puerto Espinosa, Josefina María de Izamal Puerto Espinosa de Peón, Susana Puerto Espinosa de Lizarraga, José Alejandro Puerto Espinosa and José Agustín Puerto Espinosa inherited his property and sold 12.5% of the interest to José María Palomeque Cosgaya.

The current ownership of the property is held 50% by José María Palomeque Cosgaya, 25% by Humberto Rodríguez Perera and 25% by the Puerto Espinosa heirs. In 1995, Chenkú was designated as a Cultural Heritage Site by the City Council of Mérida. The property is partially restored and may be rented as a venue for photographs or parties.

== Architecture ==
The main house is distinguished by its colonial architecture, which is symmetrical and has simplistic decoration. The arches flanking the main entry, the belfry and the central staircase all maintain the symmetry of the colonial style. The evolution of the house from a livestock ranch to a henequen plantation is shown by the arcades being on both the front and rear façades of the house. Inside the house is some of the original antique furniture of the hacienda.

The grounds contain a pond in front and the rear courtyard has an expanse of grass, many trees and a swimming pool.

== Demographics ==
All of the henequen plantations ceased to exist as autonomous communities with the agrarian land reform implemented by President Lazaro Cardenas in 1937. His decree turned the haciendas into collective ejidos, leaving only 150 hectares to the former landowners for use as private property. Figures before 1937 indicate populations living on the farm. After 1937, figures indicate those living in the community, as the remaining Hacienda Chenkú houses only the owner's immediate family.

According to the 1970 census conducted by the INEGI, the population of the location was 68 inhabitants. Since that time, the inhabitants are enumerated in the City of Mérida figures.

Population of Chenkú by year
Year	1900	1910	1921	1930	1940	1950	1960	1970
Population	351	233	117	126	57	45	52	68

== Photo gallery ==
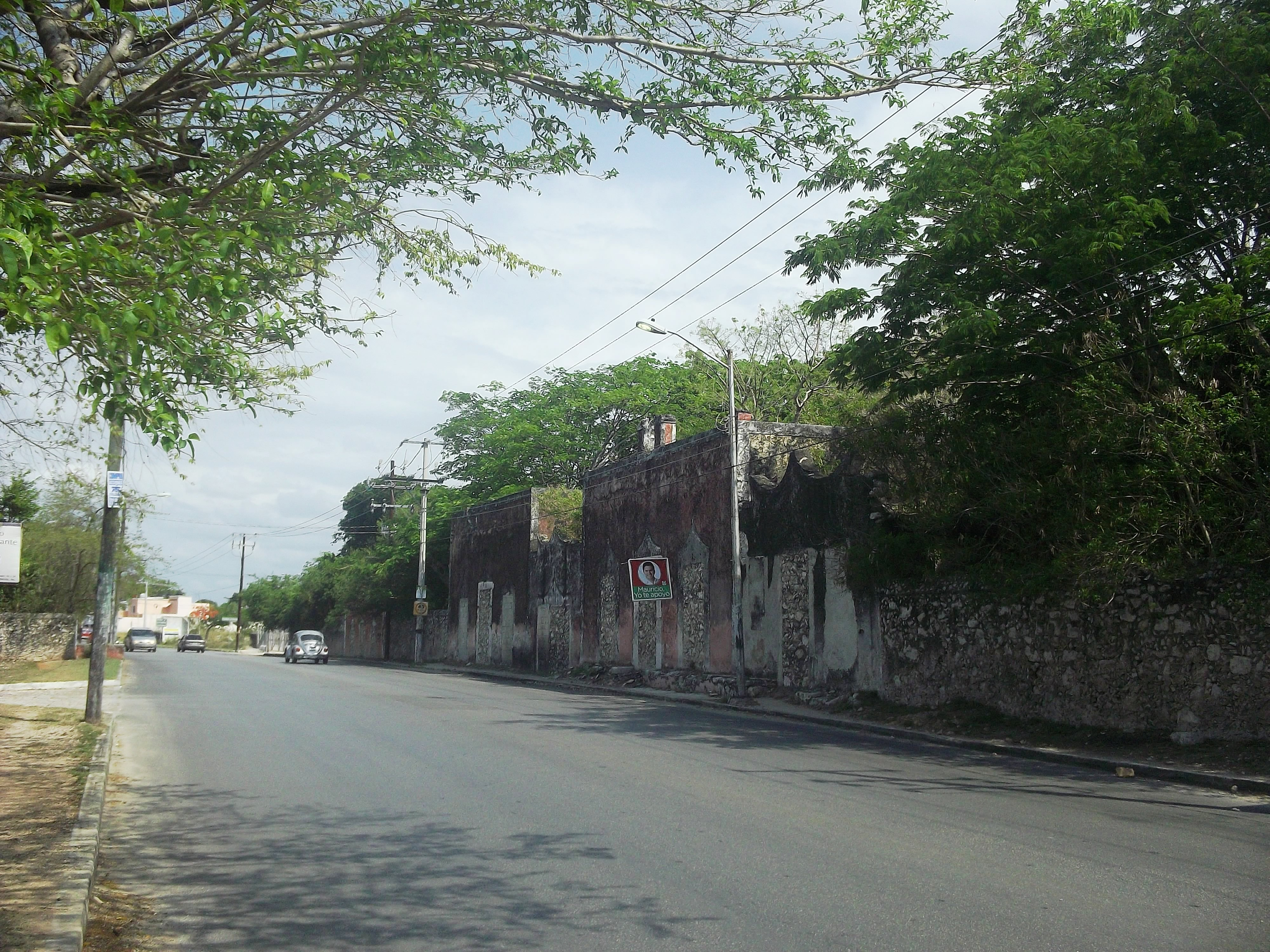
Hacienda Chenkú

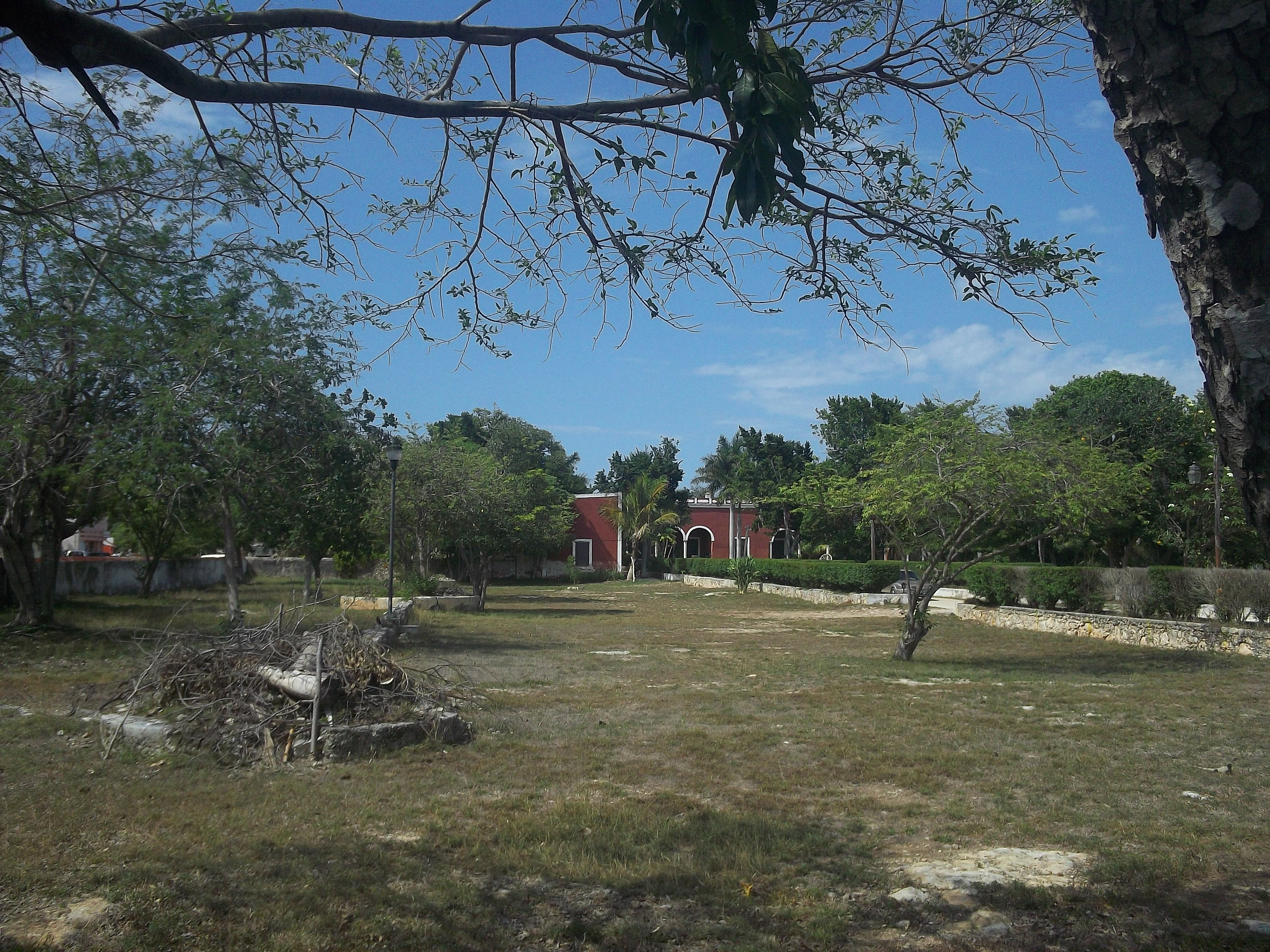
Hacienda Chenkú

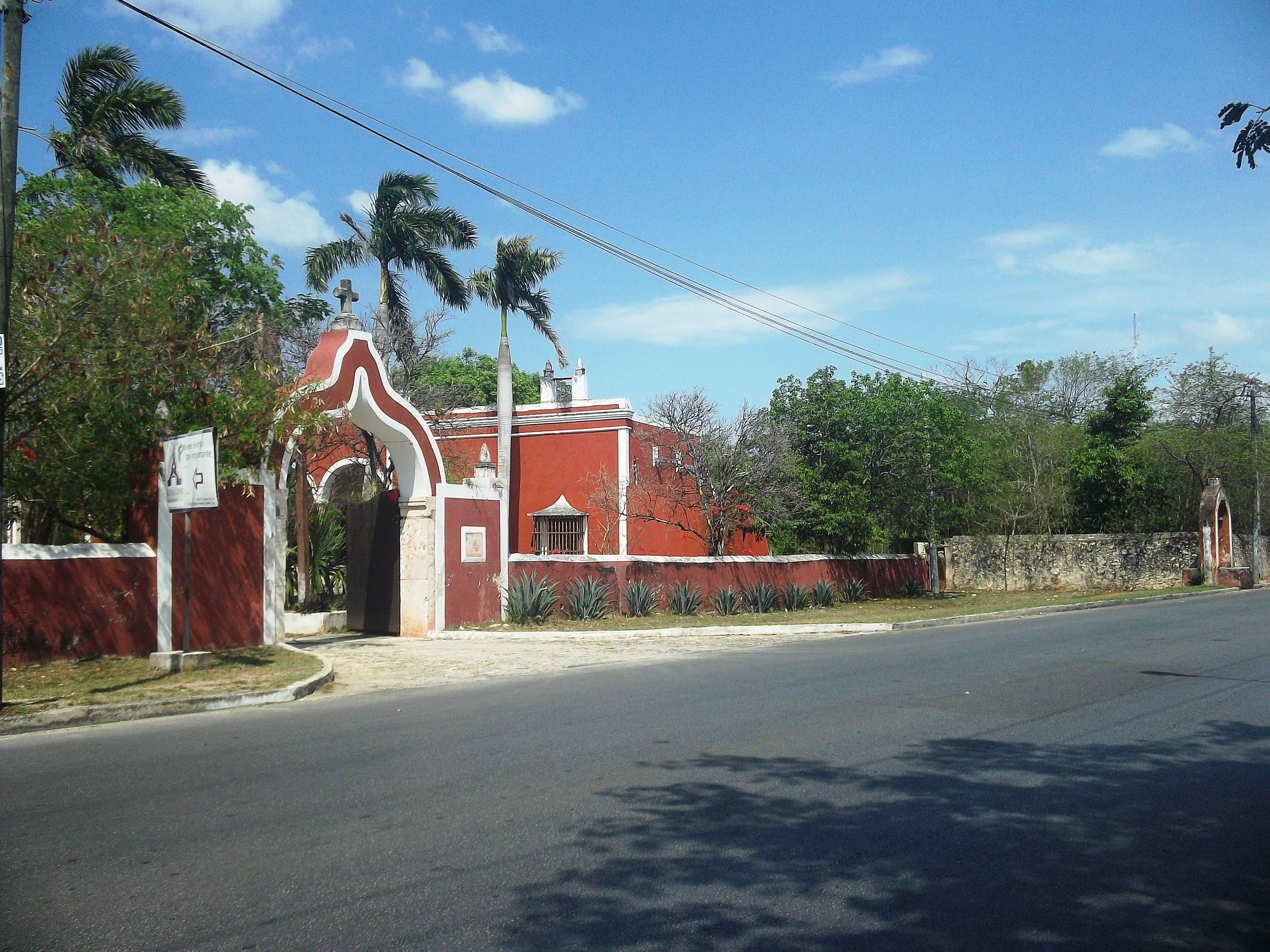
Hacienda Chenkú

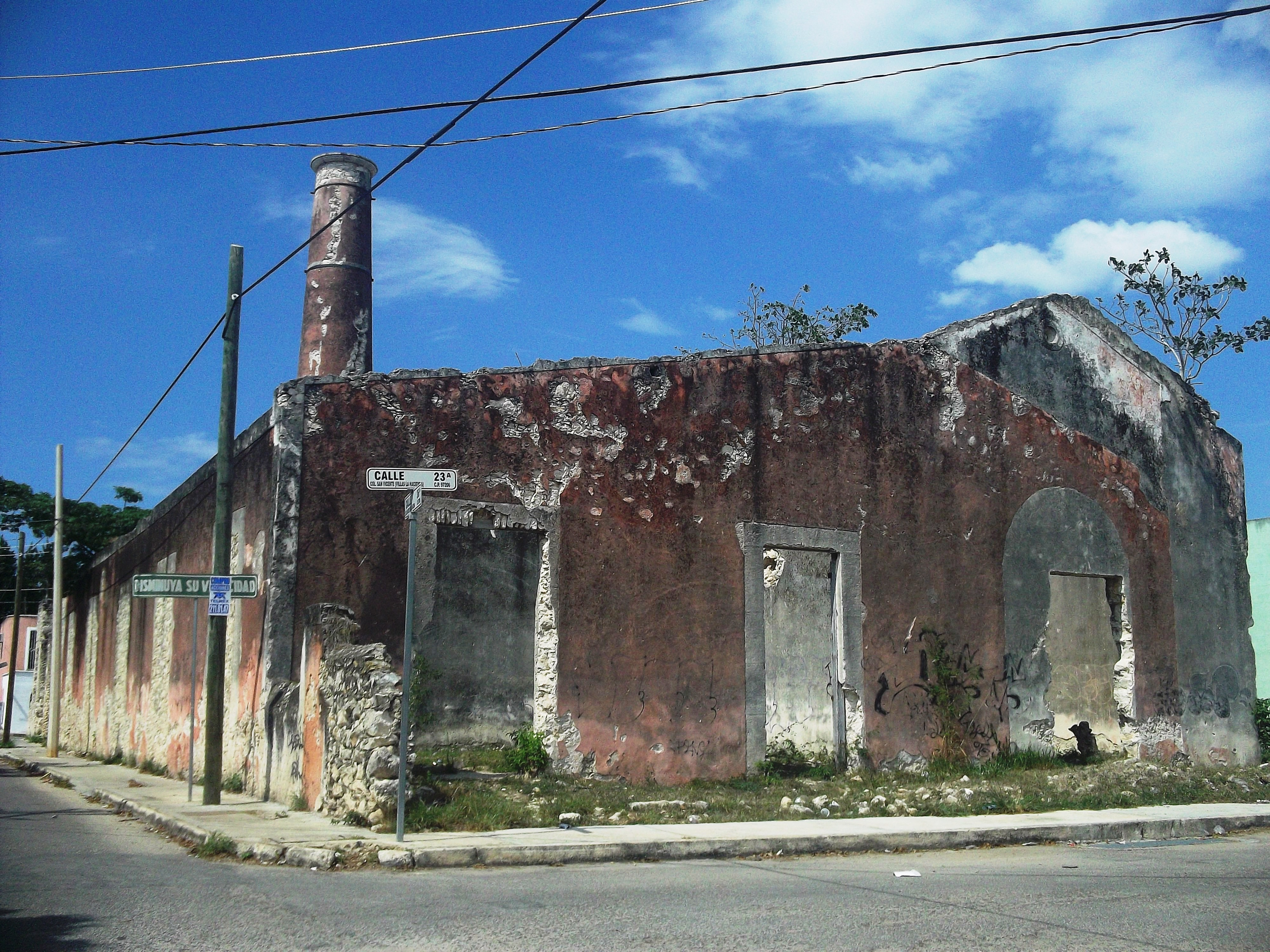
Hacienda Chenkú

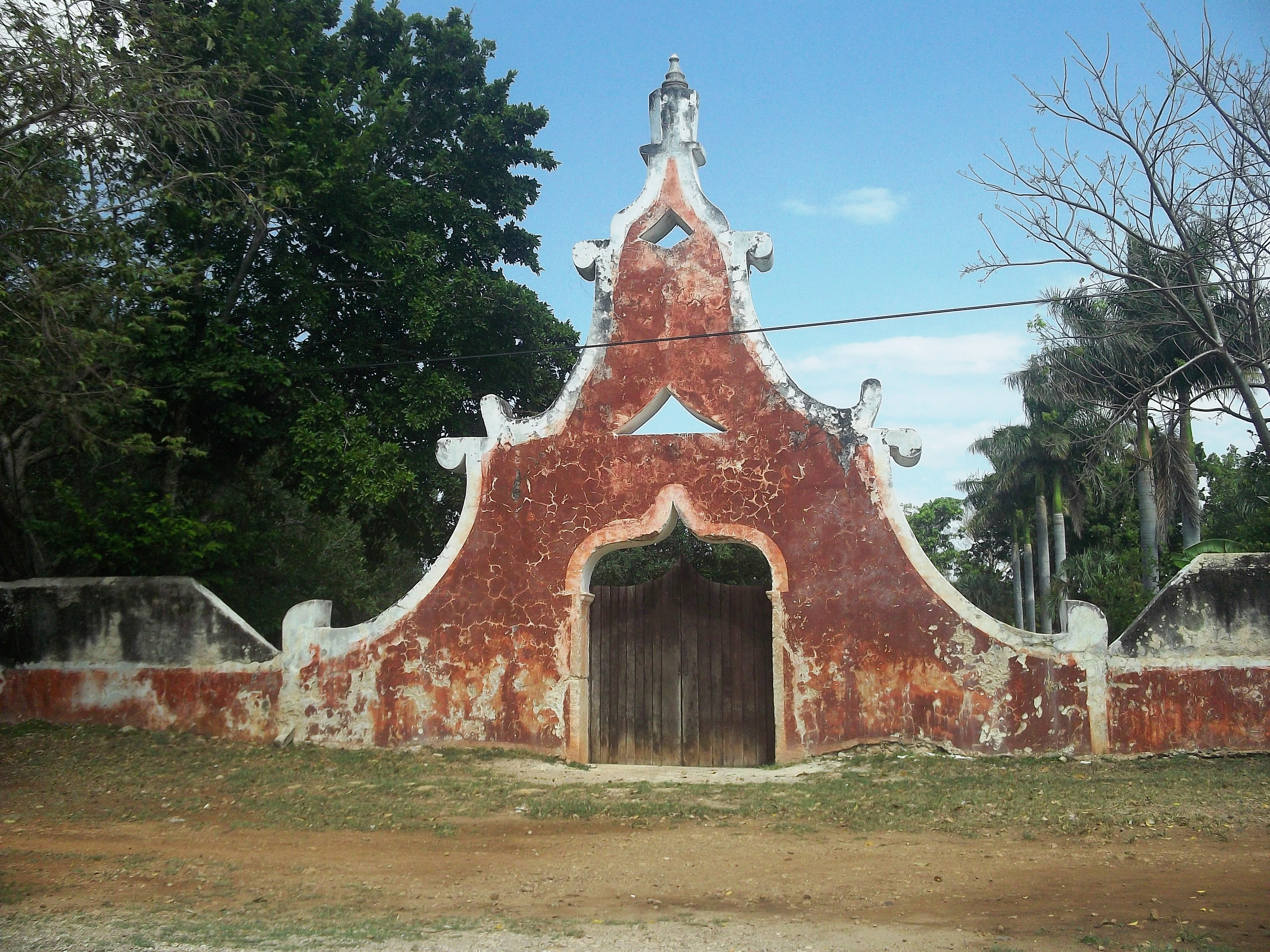
Hacienda Chenkú

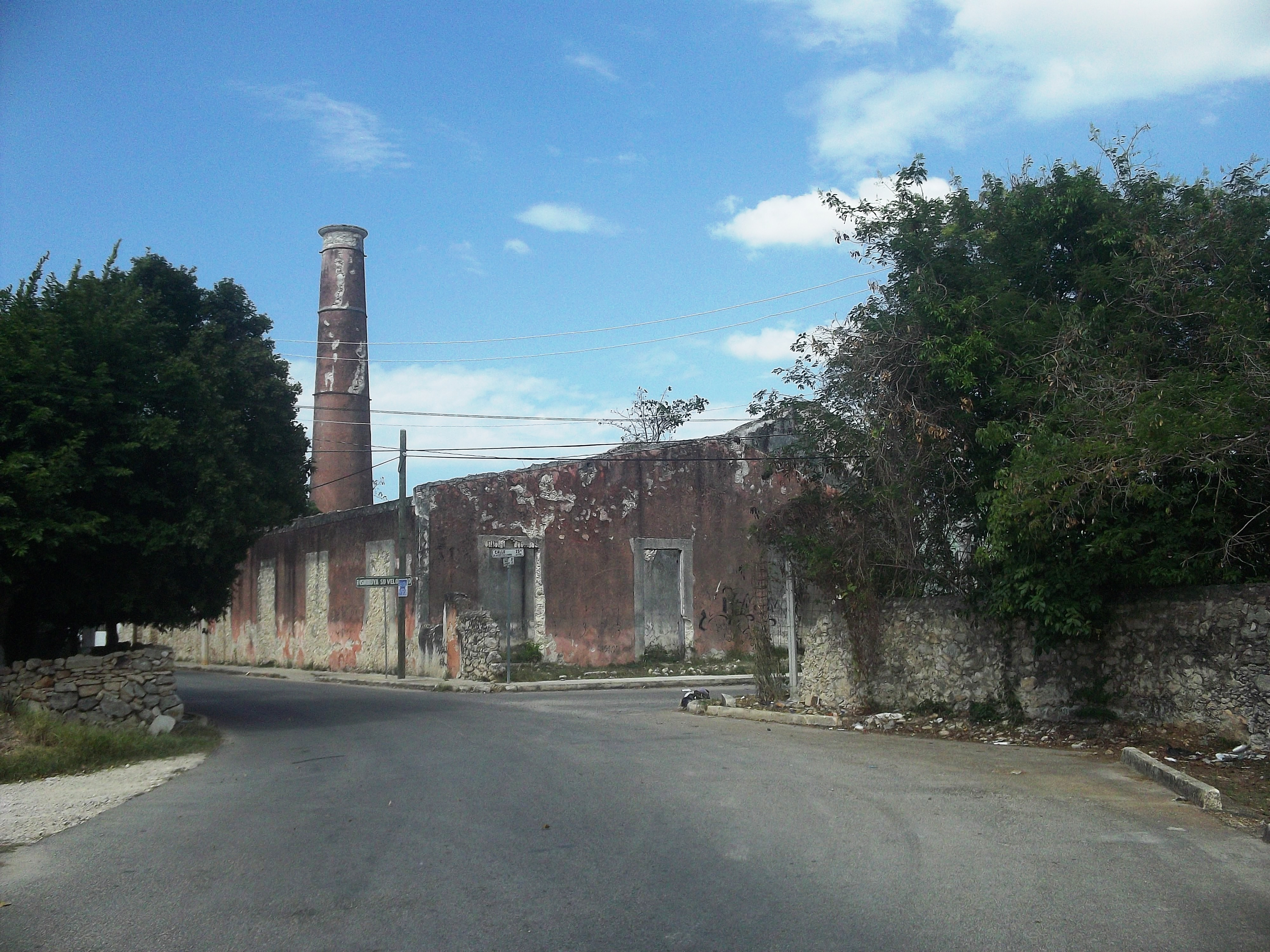
Hacienda Chenkú

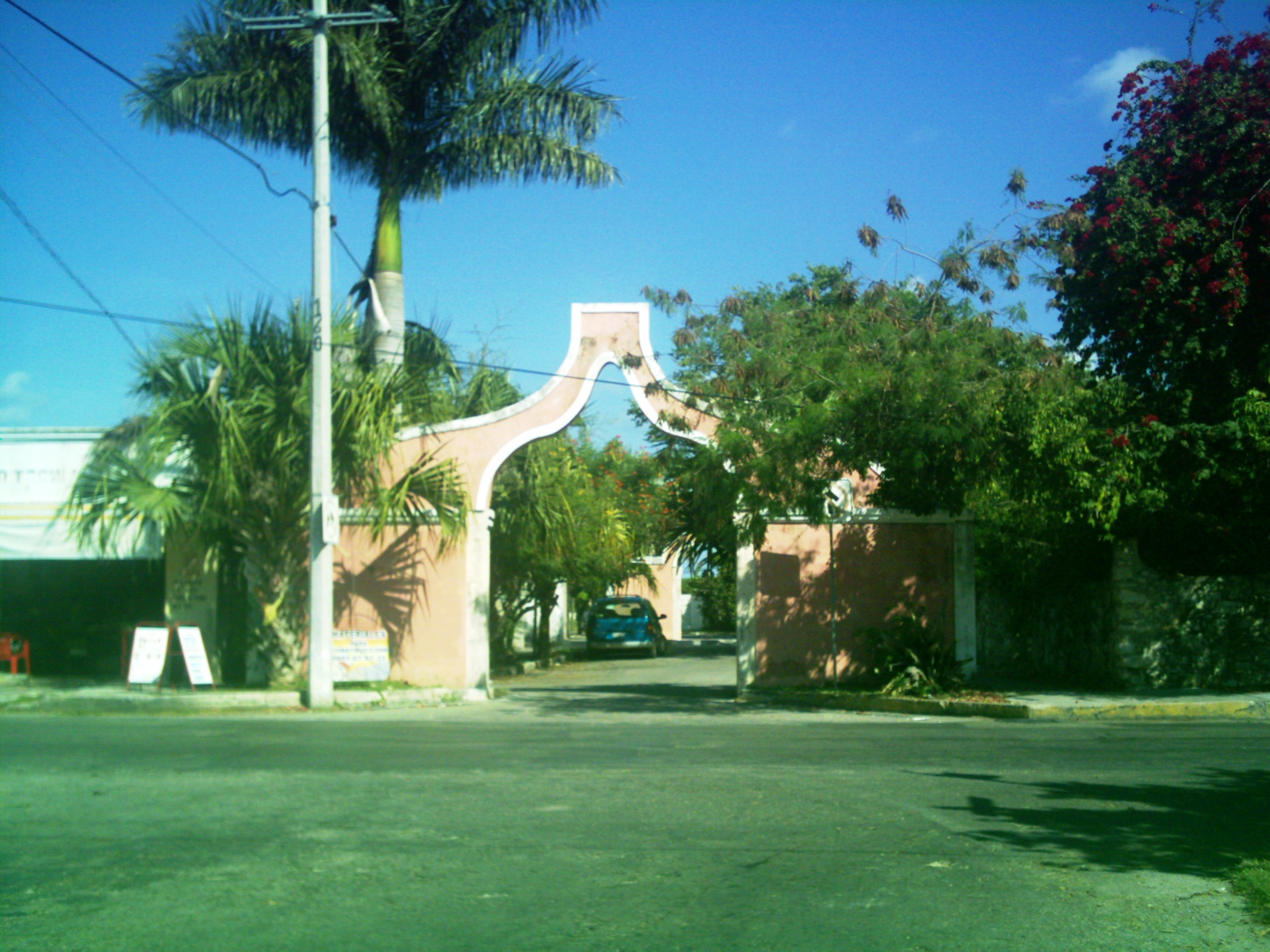
Hacienda Chenkú

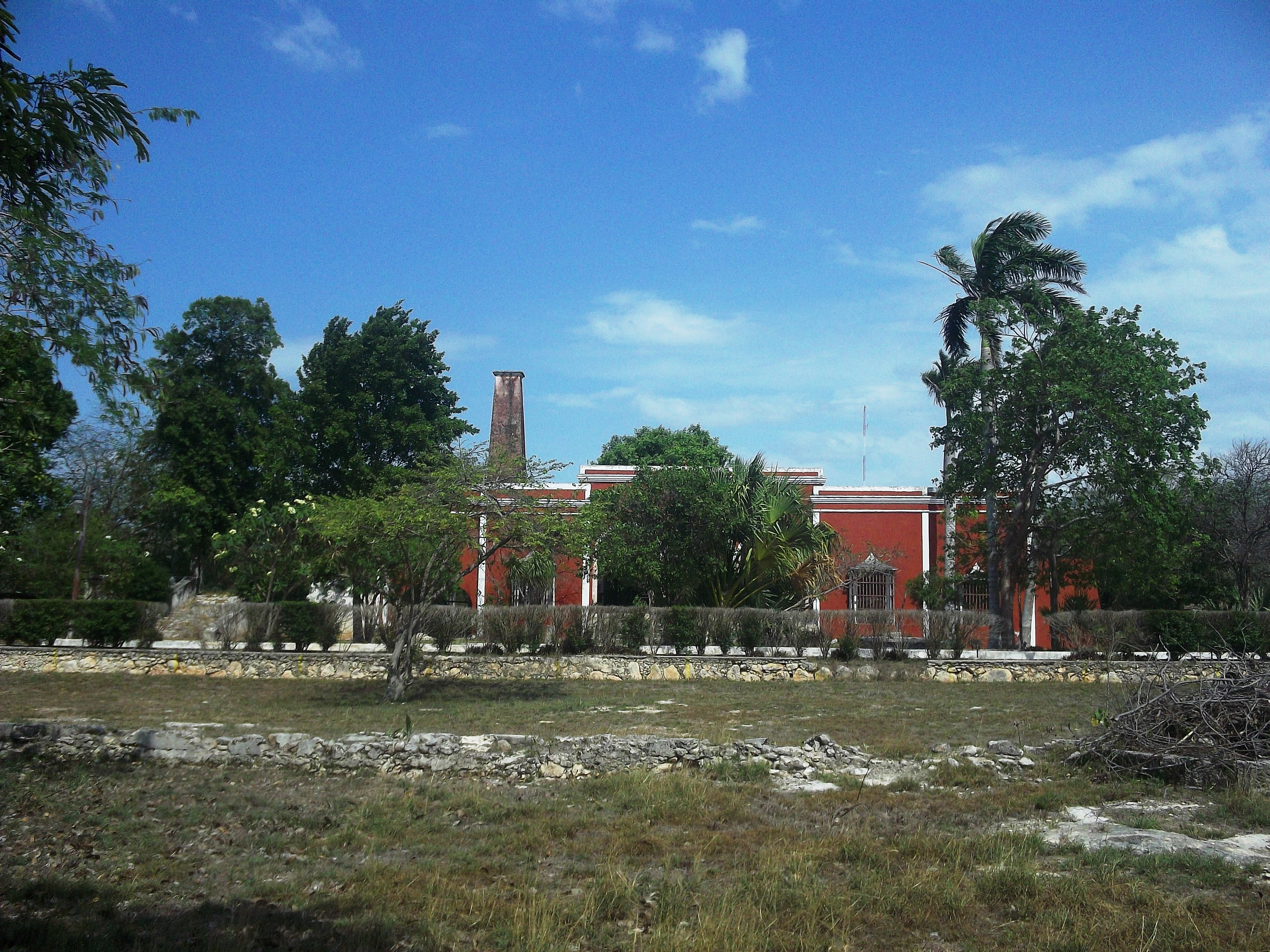
Hacienda Chenkú

== Bibliography ==
- Bracamonte, P and Solís, R., Los espacios de autonomía maya, Ed. UADY, Mérida, 1997.
- Gobierno del Estado de Yucatán, "Los municipios de Yucatán", 1988.
- Kurjack, Edward y Silvia Garza, Atlas arqueológico del Estado de Yucatán, Ed. INAH, 1980.
- Patch, Robert, La formación de las estancias y haciendas en Yucatán durante la colonia, Ed. UADY, 1976.
- Peón Ancona, J. F., "Las antiguas haciendas de Yucatán", en Diario de Yucatán, Mérida, 1971.
