= Alfredo Cámara Vales =

Mexican Businessman, Politician and Revolutionary

Governor of Quintana Roo
- In office 1912–1913
- President: Francisco I. Madero

Personal details
- Born: May 31, 1879; Mérida, Yucatán, Mexico
- Political party: Progressive Constitutionalist Party (Mexico)
- Spouse: María del Pilar Rosas Garibaldi
- Children: 8
- Parent(s): Raymundo Cámara Luján (father); María del Cármen Vales Castillo (mother)
- Relatives: Pino-Cámara Family; Agustín Vales Castillo (uncle); Ismael Moreno Pino (grand-nephew)

Alfredo Cámara Vales (1879 - 1957) was a Mexican businessman and liberal politician who served as the Governor of Quintana Roo from 1912 to 1913. He fought during the Mexican Revolution.

His political career began as a supporter of Francisco I. Madero. He organized numerous anti-reelectionist clubs throughout the Yucatán Peninsula, working closely with his brother-in-law, José María Pino Suárez, and his brother, Nicolás. In 1912, Alfredo was appointed as the Governor of Quintana Roo by Madero. However, his tenure was short-lived as he was removed from the position by General Victoriano Huerta, who seized power through a military coup d'état during the Ten Tragic Days.

Nevertheless, Alfredo, along with his brother Nicolás, played a significant role in financing the campaign against Huerta and actively organized a revolutionary movement to overthrow him. Engaging in daring incursions, Alfredo conducted military operations in various states in the southeast of Mexico, aligning himself with the uprising led by Venustiano Carranza.

== Early life ==
Alfredo, born on May 31, 1879, in Mérida, Yucatán, was the fourth child among fourteen siblings. His parents were Raymundo Cámara Luján and María del Carmen Vales Castillo. The Cámara family had a rich history in the region, dating back to the Spanish conquest, and they had owned significant landholdings since the early colonial period.

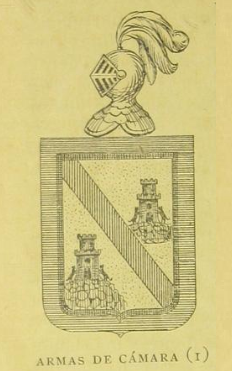
Coat of Arms of the Cámara Family

Raymundo Cámara, Alfredo's father, played a prominent role in the economic development of Yucatán in the late 19th and early 20th centuries.He owned numerous haciendas, actively involved in henequen and sugarcane production. Additionally, he was one of the founding partners of the Mercantile Bank of Yucatán in 1890.

Alfredo's brother, Nicolás, also held the position of governor of Yucatán, and María, their sister was married to José María Pino Suárez, who served as the vice-president of Mexico between 1911 and 1913. Meanwhile, Alfredo's maternal uncle was Agustín Vales Castillo, an industrialist and banker, who served as the mayor of Mérida.

On October 12, 1899, he married María del Pilar Rosas Garibaldi and they had eight children: María del Pilar, Alfredo, Aída, Alina, Raúl, Carlos, Mario, and Iván.

== Political career ==
Alfredo Cámara Vales was an early supporter of Francisco I. Madero in the Yucatán Peninsula. In 1909, upon Madero's arrival in Mérida, he was the first to shout, 'Long live Madero!' which was echoed by the crowd. The first Anti-Reelectionist Club in Mérida had José María Pino Suárez as chair and Cámara Vales was a member of the board of trustees. Between 1909 and 1911, Pino Suárez and his brothers-in-law, Nicolás and Alfredo Cámara Vales, organized many anti-reelectionist clubs that spread throughout the Peninsula, all the way to Tabasco.

Cámara Vales was appointed by Francisco I. Madero as the Governor of the Federal Territory of Quintana Roo on September 9, 1912. However, nearly six months later, on February 27, 1913, he was removed from his position by General Victoriano Huerta, who seized control of the Mexican government during a military coup d'état, known as the Ten Tragic Days, and ordered the assassination of Francisco I. Madero and José María Pino Suárez.

Alfredo and his brother Nicolás represented a significant source of support in financing the campaign against Huerta. That same year, Cámara Vales and General Manuel Castilla Brito, former Governor of Campeche, organized a revolutionary movement aimed at overthrowing Huerta. They acquired a shipment of weapons from the United States, which Cámara Vales personally transported from New Orleans to British Honduras (now Belize), with the support of the United Fruit Company. The revolutionaries established military headquarters in the British colony and in Guatemala. In 1914, the Mexican Foreign Ministry received a cable that Cámara Vales had successfully smuggled weapons into Sisal and El Cuyo which he planned to use against the Huerta regime.

In 1914, Cámara Vales carried out incursions into the states of Campeche, Tabasco, and Chiapas. During that year, Cámara Vales aligned himself with the uprising headed by Venustiano Carranza. The Huerta regime collapsed in the summer of 1914.

In the 1920s, he made a fortune exploiting chicle (natural gum) in Quintana Roo which he then sold to Robert S. Turton, an Englishman and the multi-millionaire agent of the Wrigley Company in Belize.
