= Progressive Constitutionalist Party (Mexico) =

Defunct political party in Mexico

Progressive Constitutionalist Party Partido Constitucional Progresista
- Leaders: Francisco I. Madero, José María Pino Suárez, Juan Sánchez Azcona
- Founder: Francisco I. Madero
- Founded: 1909 (as the National Antireelectionist Party)
- Dissolved: 1913
- Headquarters: Mexico City
- Ideology: Liberalism (Mexican); Maderism; Constitutionalism; Secularism
- Political position: 1909–1912: Centre-left to left-wing 1912–1913: Centre to centre-right
- Colors

The Progressive Constitutionalist Party (Spanish: Partido Constitucional Progresista), known by its acronym PCP, was a liberal political party that existed between 1909 and 1913. It drew ideologically from social liberalism, as well as economic liberalism. The party was formed as the conservative wing of the former Liberal Party but not as conservative as the Liberal Party itself under Porfirio Díaz, which in the early 20th century had splintered into more radical factions, represented by the Mexican Liberal Party (PLM).

The party was originally founded in 1909 as the National Antireelectionist Party (Spanish: Partido Nacional Antirreeleccionista) and was rebranded in 1911 as the PCP.

== Ideology ==
The guiding principle of the party was constitutionalism, seeking to reestablish the supremacy of the Federal Constitution of 1857 and the rule of law after thirty years of dictatorship of General Porfirio Díaz. The PCP was also a liberal progressive party that sought to pragmatically introduce some moderate social reforms in order to quench the thirst for justice of a country that was already at the threshold of a social revolution. The ideas of the Party were established in The Presidential Succession in 1910, a best-selling book published in 1909 by Francisco I. Madero, the scion of one of the wealthiest families in Mexico.

== History ==
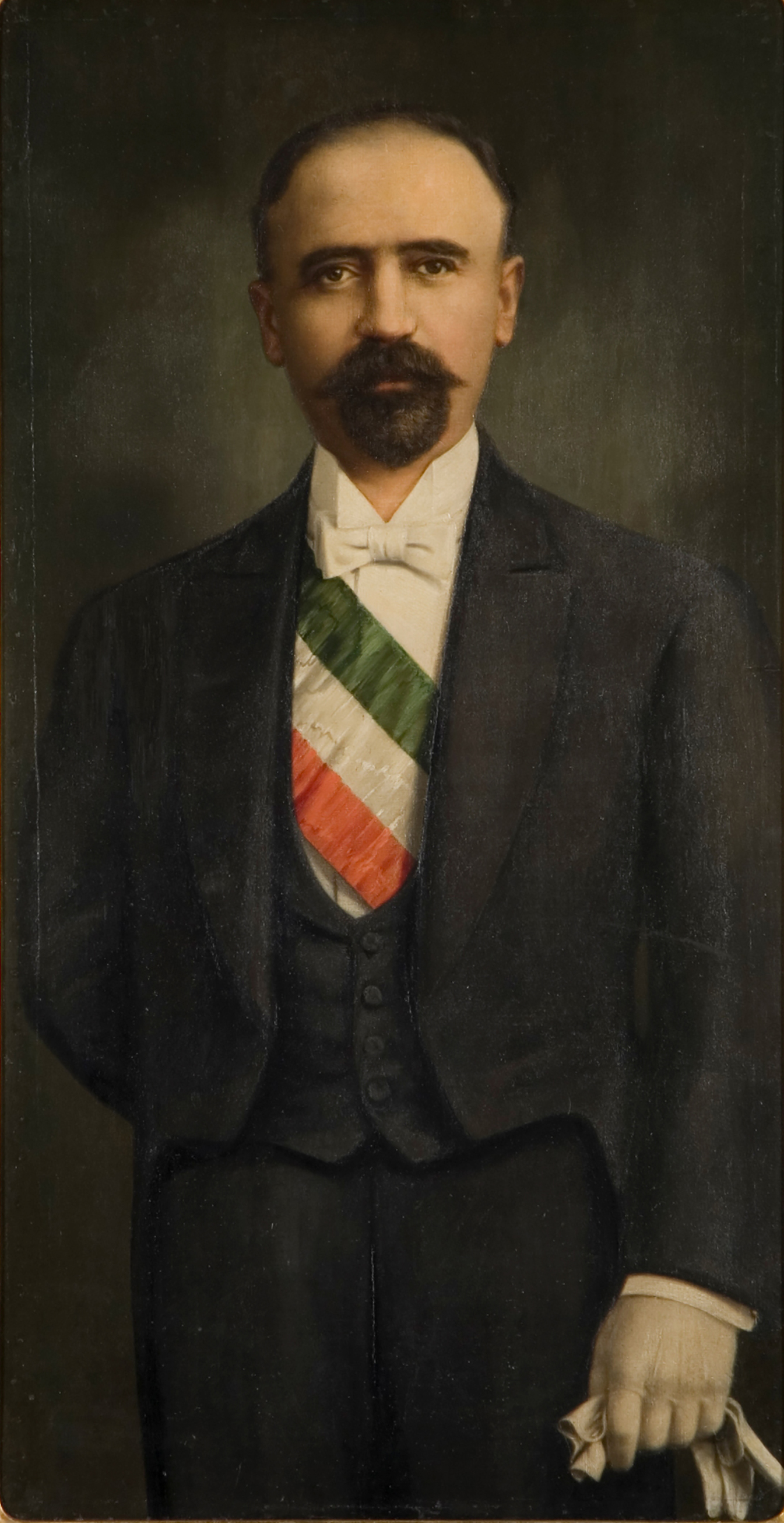
Francisco I. Madero, the founder and ideologue of the Progressive Constitutionalists, became the first democratically elected President of Mexico, governing between 1911 and his assassination in 1913.

After the triumph of Francisco I. Madero to the presidency of the republic and José María Pino Suárez to the vice presidency of the republic in the 1911 presidential elections, the PCP exercised executive power in Mexico between 1911 and 1913. In this same period, their candidates were elected in several local and municipal elections. Between 1912 and 1913, the PCP also had a majority in the Congress of the Union. In February 1913, during the events of the Ten Tragic Days, a military coup erupted that overthrew the Madero government, effectively interrupting the observation of the Federal Constitution of 1857. When the rule of law was restored with the Federal Constitution of 1917, the PCP did not regroup. Notwithstanding the foregoing, several former party members would play a leading role in the formation of a post-revolutionary order after the Mexican Revolution.

Like the Liberal Party before it, the PCP was also the victim of a splinter. One faction believed that under Madero's leadership the PCP had become far too conservative, failing to appeal to the social demands of the Revolution. They decided to found a new party: the Liberal Constitutionalist Party (Spanish: Partido Liberal Constitucionalista, PLC). Under the leadership of Venustiano Carranza, the PLC leaned closer towards the centre-left ground of politics, effectively positioning themselves as social democrats. In 1929, the PLC merged to form part of the National Revolutionary Party (Spanish: Partido Nacional Revolucionario, PNR) the governing party which held uninterrupted power in the country between 1929 and 2000. Another faction, led by José Vasconcelos, felt that the PNR had become too authoritarian and had betrayed the liberal and constitutionalist principles espoused by Madero and the PCP. During the 1929 presidential elections, widely believed to be fraudulent, José Vasconcelos briefly revived the National Anti-Reelectionist Party, deciding to stand as a presidential candidate against Pascual Ortiz Rubio, the government candidate. Ten years after the arrest and subsequent exile of Vasconcelos, Manuel Gómez Morín, one of his closest collaborators, founded the centre-right National Action Party (Spanish: Partido de Acción Nacional, PAN), which would become the main opposition party. After the triumph of Vicente Fox during the 2000 presidential election, he became the first opposition president since the Revolution, culminating Mexico's democratic transition, as originally envisioned by Madero.
