= Opichén Municipality =

Municipality in the Mexican state of Yucatán

Opichén
- Municipality
- Region 1 Poniente #055

- Location of the Municipality in Mexico
- Coordinates: 20°32′59″N 89°46′25″W
- Country: Mexico
- State: Yucatán
- Mexico Ind.: 1821
- Yucatán Est.: 1824

Government
  - Type: 2012–2015
  - Municipal President: Carlos Enrique Ku

Area
  - Total: 268.25 km^{2} (103.57 sq mi)
- Elevation: 10 m (33 ft)

Population (2010)
  - Total: 6,285
  - Density: 23.43/km^{2} (60.68/sq mi)
  - Demonym: Umanense
- Time zone: UTC-6 (Central Standard Time)
- INEGI Code: 055
- Major Airport: Merida (Manuel Crescencio Rejón) International Airport
- IATA Code: MID
- ICAO Code: MMMD

Opichén Municipality (Yucatec Maya: "inside the cave or the well") is a municipality in the Mexican state of Yucatán containing 268.25 km^{2} of land and is located roughly 75 kilometres (47 mi) south of the city of Mérida.

== History ==
There is no accurate data on when the town was founded, but it was a settlement before the conquest and was located in the chieftainship of Tutul Xiu. After colonization, the area became part of the encomienda system with various encomenderos, such as in Iñigo de Sugasti in 1607; Pedro de Santo Domingo Campos and Diego Hidalgo Bravo in 1639; Juan Esteban de Aguilar, Cristóbal Matías Hidalgo Bravo, and Juan Esteban Tello de Aguilar in 1652; and Ana de Vaneda Villegas in 1705.

Yucatán declared its independence from the Spanish Crown in 1821 and in 1825 the area was assigned to the Camino Real under the Maxcanú Municipality. In 1988 the area was confirmed as its own municipality.

== Governance ==
The municipal president is elected for a three-year term. The town council has four councilpersons, who serve as Secretary and councilors of public cleanliness, parks and gardens, public monuments.

The Municipal Council administers the business of the municipality. It is responsible for budgeting and expenditures and producing all required reports for all branches of the municipal administration. Annually it determines educational standards for schools.

The Police Commissioners ensure public order and safety. They are tasked with enforcing regulations, distributing materials and administering rulings of general compliance issued by the council.

== Communities ==
The head of the municipality is Opichén, Yucatán. The municipality has 12 other populated places including Calcehtók, Cok, Kaukiriche, Mena, Ojina, San Antonio, San Esteban, Santa Rita, Santa Rosa, Siuch, and Rancho Xikim. The significant populations are shown below:

| Community | Population |
|---|---|
| Entire Municipality (2010) | 6,285 |
| Calcehtok | 1356 in 2005 |
| Opichén | 4216 in 2005 |

== Local festivals ==
Every year from 23 to 27 February is a celebration for the pueblo; from 8 to 12 June is the festival to honor of St. Barnabas; and at the end of August the town holds the feast of San Bartolo.

== Tourist attractions ==
- Church of San Bartolomé, built in the eighteenth century
- Chapel of the Mejorada, built in the eighteenth century
- Hacienda Calcehtoc
