= Maderism =

Mexican political movement

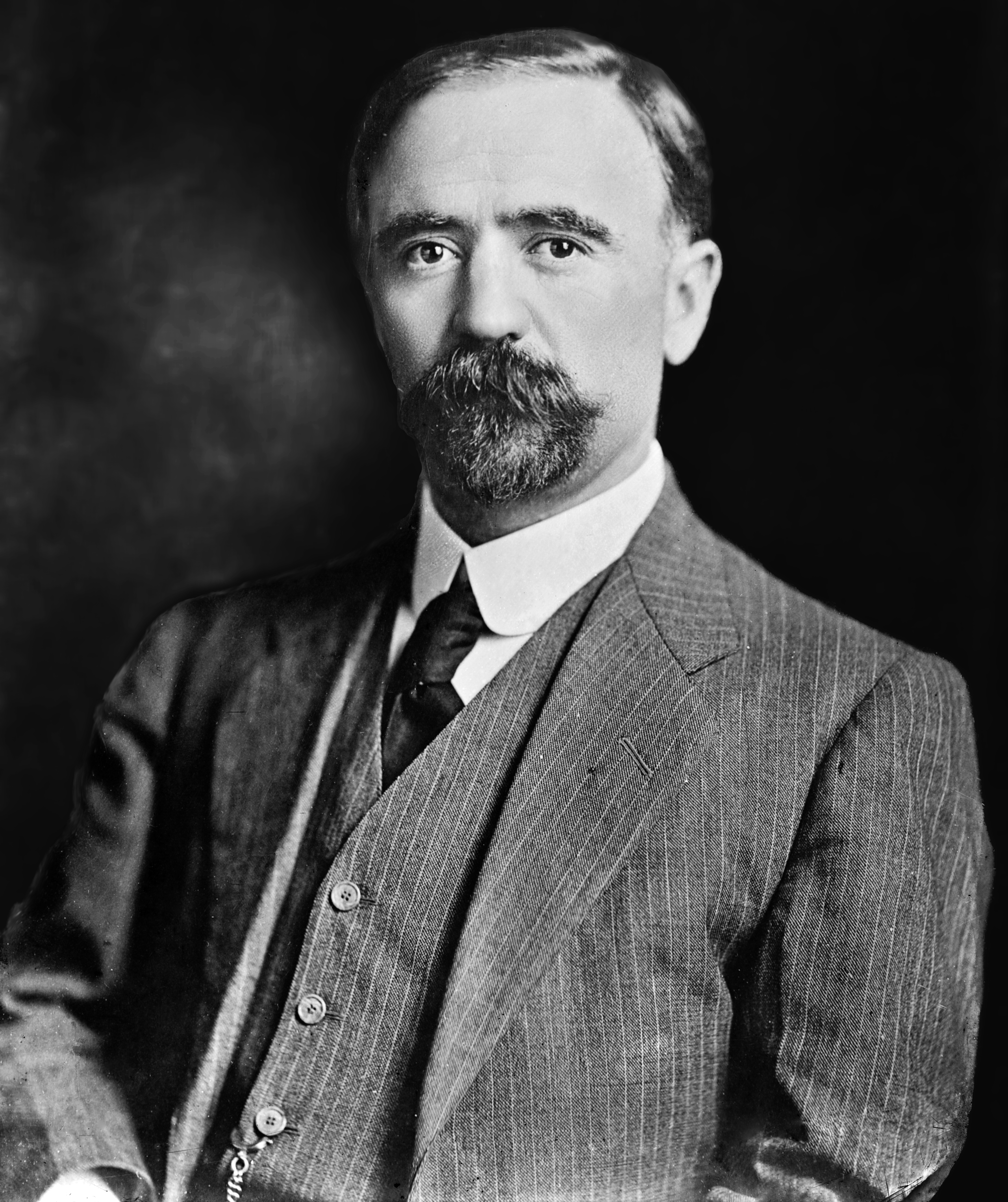
Madero

Maderism was the first of the movements that formed the Mexican Revolution. It was led by Francisco I. Madero between 1909 and 1910.

Its main objective was to achieve democratic regeneration of the country through effective suffrage and no re-election of public officials. These ideas were shaped by Madero in his book La sucesión presidencial en 1910 (The Presidential Succession in 1910), which riled the Mexican political class and even allowed Madero to meet with President Porfirio Diaz.

The revolt against Diaz began on November 20, 1910, and soon spread throughout the country. The president was forced to resign on May 25, 1911, ending the armed movement led by Madero.
