= List of vice presidents of Mexico =

Vice President of Mexico
- Vicepresidente de México
- Coat of arms of Mexico (1824–1918)

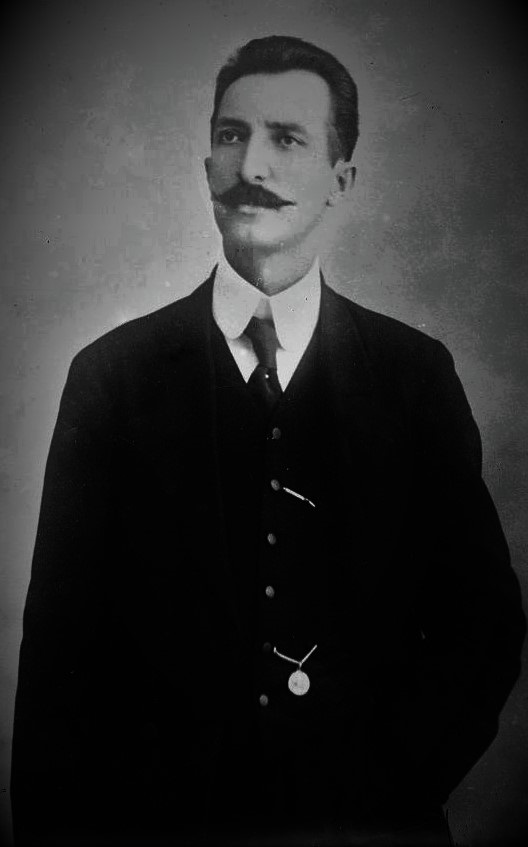
- José María Pino Suárez; Last office holder
- Formation: 10 October 1824
- First holder: Nicolás Bravo
- Final holder: José María Pino Suárez
- Abolished: 5 February 1917 (permanently vacant from 19 February 1913)
- Superseded by: Secretary of the Interior

The office of the vice president of Mexico was first created by the Constitution of 1824, then it was abolished in 1836 by the Seven Constitutional Laws, then briefly restored in 1846 following the restoration of the Constitution of 1824 and lasted a year until 1847 where it was again abolished through a constitutional amendment, it was later restored in 1904 through an amendment to the Constitution of 1857, before being finally abolished by the current Constitution of 1917. Many Mexican vice presidents acted as president during time between the end of the First Mexican Empire and the establishment of the Second Mexican Empire.

== Vice presidents of Mexico ==
Parties

Conservative Party
Liberal Party
National Porfirist Party / National Reelectionist Party
Anti-Reelectionist Party / Progressive Constitutionalist Party

No.	Portrait	Name (Birth–Death)	Term of office		Party
1		Nicolás Bravo (1786–1854)	10 October 1824	23 December 1827	Conservative Party
2		Anastasio Bustamante (1780–1853)	11 June 1829	23 December 1832	Conservative Party
3		Valentín Gómez Farías (1781–1858)	1 April 1833	26 January 1835	Liberal Party
4		Nicolás Bravo (1786–1854)	12 June 1846	6 August 1846	Conservative Party
5		Valentín Gómez Farías (1781–1858)	23 December 1846	1 April 1847	Liberal Party
6		Ramón Corral (1854–1912)	1 December 1904	23 May 1911	National Porfirist Party; National Reelectionist Party
7		José María Pino Suárez (1869–1913)	6 November 1911	19 February 1913 (Assassinated)	Anti-Reelectionist Party; Progressive Constitutionalist Party
Post vacant (19 February 1913 – 5 February 1917)
Post abolished (5 February 1917 – present)

== Possible restoration ==
The Institutional Revolutionary Party (PRI) presented on 13 May 2022 a proposal for an electoral reform that would include the restoration of the post of vice president, among nine other proposals. In the proposal, it was proposed that the vice president would be a direct assistant of the president, and that the vice president could also assist the Senate with voice, but without vote.

The PRI proposal was launched in opposition to proposals of President Andrés Manuel López Obrador on electoral reforms, leading to the 2024 elections.

== See also ==
- President of Mexico
- List of heads of state of Mexico
