= Captaincies of the Azores =

The Captaincies of the Azores (Portuguese: Capitanias dos Açores) were the socio-political and administrative territorial divisions used to settle and govern the overseas lands of the Azores by the Kingdom of Portugal. These territories, a segment of the Captaincies of the Portuguese Empire, which usually conformed to the individual islands, allowing the stewardship of the King through the Donatary and Captaincy system.

== History ==
Following the discovery of the first islands in the Atlantic, chiefly Madeira, and slow settlement of those possessions, the Portuguese needed a mechanism for control that did not necessitate dislocation by hereditary princes or monarchs. The Donatário system allowed the monarch to appoint individuals of confidence to run their affairs in those territories. Initially, Henry the Navigator was bestowed the administration and development of newly discovered lands, which he then transferred to the possession of the Order of Christ (to which he was its head). His heirs and descendants (the Dukes of Viseu) would therefore oversea the orderly expansion of Portuguese dominion in the New World, without necessarily venturing into the seas.

To this end, and by extension, he nominated his own men of confidence (since the Salic Laws only permitted the transfer of title to legitimate male heirs) that would directly oversea the activities in his place. These "captains" or capitães dos donatários (captains of the donataries) would govern in his place, endowed with certain privileges that facilitated their stewardship and rewarded their active development of the territory. The captaincies were, therefore, a scaled-down version of the donatário system.

On 15 August 1432 a small vessel disembarked on the northern shore of what became known as the islands of the Azores. There quick settlement, resulted in Prince Henry applying the same method of consolidating faithful relationships, deeming some vassals sources of manpower to conduct political and economic administration of the archipelago. Therefore, the captaincy system was employed on the islands, which in the beginning were limited to a group of rocky outcrops (the Formigas) and the unspoiled island of Santa Maria, where settlers had made a beachhead in the northern region of Anjos. With progressive discoveries, the number of captaincies expanded, only broken by inter- and intra-island rivalries and death.

=== Commander of Santa Maria and Captain of the Azores ===
- 1439–1461 — Gonçalo Velho Cabral

As "discoverer" and commander of the expedition to the Atlantic, Cabral was the first commander to obtain the title of Captain of the Donatary in the Azores. Yet, the title bestowed on Gonçalo Velho is not very clear, as it has been both referred to as the comendador da ilha de Santa Maria e nosso capitão nos Açores (Commander of the island of Santa Maria and Our captain of the Azores), or alternately as the comendador das ilhas dos Açores (Commander of the Azores). The more probable interpretation of this role, being from the Order of Christ responsible for the administration of the islands, came from the comenda regime, referring to a knighthood or commandery, normally associated with the Order in Portugal, but applied to the, then, populous island of Santa Maria in the archipelago. Still, in 1460, in a letter from Henry the Navigator, the prince described Cabral as Capitão por mim em minhas ilhas de Santa Maria e São Miguel dos Açores (Captain for Me in My Islands of Santa Maria and São Miguel in the Azores).

Cabral was the ideal Captain to obtain this title, who "cultivated the island [of Santa Maria] with noble people, treating the island with much love and caring the people with much gentleness; for this reason he was obeyed by all and very dear to the entire island. It is still unclear at what time Gonaçalo Velho Cabral abrogated and vacated the captaincy of the two islands to his nephew, João Soares de Albergaria.

=== Donatary-Captaincy of Santa Maria ===
After the sale of the captaincy of São Miguel to Rui Gonçalves da Câmara, the Captaincy of Santa Maria and São Miguel was divided into two separate administrations, with Santa Maria remaining in the hands of Gonçalo Velho Cabrals successor, João Soares de Albergaria.

- 1474–1499 — João Soares de Albergaria; succeed his maternal uncle (Gonçalo Velho Cabral) in the commandership of the Azores, he sold his privileges to São Miguel to Rui Gonçalves da Câmara in order obtain free-up money during his wife's illness; Albergaria was responsible for promoting the settlement on the island and its defense, but was captured during a Castilian raid and ransomed. He, eventually, returned to the island late in his life.
- 1499–1571 — João Soares de Sousa; until 1509 it was Lieutenant João de Marvão who administered this territory, since at the time of João Soares de Albergaria death (1499), João Soares was only six years old at the time. He was recognized for his progressive Captain-ship of Santa Maria, assisting the poor and providing reasonable terms for land rental: for these actions he was arrested and sent to Lisbon to face judgement. He, eventually, appealed to the King and was returned to his post;
- 1571–1576? — Pedro Soares de Sousa;
- 1580–?? — Jerónimo Coutinho;
- 1594–?? — Brás Soares de Sousa;
- 1626–?? — Pedro Soares de Sousa, grandson of the previous;
- 1639–?? — Brás Soares de Sousa, grandson of the previous;
- 1649–?? — Branca de Gama;
- 1654–?? — João Falcão de Sousa;
- 1665–?? — Joana de Meneses;
- 1667–1720 — Luís de Vasconcelos e Sousa, 3rd Count of Castelo Melhor;
- 1720–1734 — Afonso de Vasconcelos e Sousa Cunha Câmara Faro e Veiga, 5th Count of Calheta;
- 1734–1801 — José de Vasconcelos e Sousa Caminha da Câmara Faro e Veiga, 1st Marquess of Castelo Melhor; the last donatary captain, before the creation of the Captaincy-General of the Azores, in 1766. After this date, the rest of the captains became honorary, while maintaining the corresponding incomes;
- 1801–1806 — António José de Vasconcelos e Sousa da Câmara Caminha Faro e Veiga, 6th Count of Calheta and 2nd Marquess of Castelo Melhor;
- 1806–1827 — Afonso de Vasconcelos e Sousa da Câmara Caminha Faro e Veiga, 7th Count of Calheta and 3rd Marquess of Castelo Melhor;
- 1827–1832 — António de Vasconcelos e Sousa da Câmara Caminha Faro e Veiga, 8th Count of Calheta and 4th Marquess of Castelo Melhor.

=== Donatary-Captaincy of São Miguel ===
Until 1474, the island of São Miguel was part of a larger fiefdom bequeathed to João Soares de Albergaria, the Captaincy of Santa Maria and São Miguel. At that time, the island was a large, underpopulated and, therefore, unproductive possession of the Donatário Diogo, Duke of Viseu, and Koão Soares was more preoccupied with the health of his wife, and looked to the sale as a way of improving his finances (during a period while he was staying with their family in Madeira). The sale by João Soares de Albergaria of the Donatary-captaincy of the islands of Santa Maria and São Miguel, lead to the separation of the administration of São Miguel from Santa Maria, after 1474.

- 1474–1497 — Rui Gonçalves da Câmara, 3rd Donatary-Captain; Duke Diogo, nephew of King Edward approved the transfer of the Donatary-captaincy to Rui da Câmara, who offered lands to settlers who were obligated to transform the uncultivated lands within a five-year contract. Those who were unable to fulfill the contract would forfeit their lands to another, who were under the same obligations, thus rapidly populating the island. It was during Rui Gonçalves administration that the provincial capital of Vila Franca was destroyed resulting in the death of many and forcing the move of the administration to Ponta Delgada.

Subsequently, all the donatary captains of São Miguel became members of the family of Rui Gonçalves da Câmara;

- 1497–1502 — João Rodrigues da Câmara, 4th Donatary-Captain; At the time of his death Rui Gonçalves had no issue; a squire to the house of Donatário D. Ferdinand, this nobleman left no heirs, and contrary to the laws of inheritance on 10 March 1474 D. Diogo authorized the bestowal of the Captaincy to this Captains illegitimate sons.
- 1502–1535 — Rui Gonçalves da Câmara II, 5th Donatary-Captain;
- 1535–1578 — Manuel da Câmara, 6th Donatary-Captain;
- 1578–1601 — Rui Gonçalves da Câmara III, 7th Donatary-Captain and 1st Count of Vila Franca;
- 1601–1619 — Manuel da Câmara II, 8th Donatary-Captain and 2nd Count of Vila Franca;
- 1619–1662 — Rodrigo da Câmara, 9th Donatary-Captain and 3rd Count of Vila Franca;
- 1662–1673 — Manuel da Câmara III, 10th Donatary-Captain, 4th Count of Vila Franca and 1st Count of Ribeira Grande;
- 1673–1724 — José Rodrigo da Câmara, 11th Donatary-Captain and 2nd Count of Ribeira Grande;
- 1724–1724 — Luís Manuel da Câmara, 12th Donatary-Captain and 3rd Count of Ribeira Grande;
- 1724–1757 — José da Câmara Teles, 13th Donatary-Captain and 4th Count of Ribeira Grande;
- 1757–1766 — Joana Tomásia da Câmara, descendent titleholder of captaincy, married to Guido Augusto da Câmara, her uncle, to whom fell the titles of 14th (and last) Donatary-Captain and 5th Count of Ribeira Grande, owing to the death of the elder son José da Câmara Teles.

=== Donatary-Captaincy of Terceira ===
The island of Terceira was established as a single captaincy, and later divided into two captaincies: that of Angra and Praia. It was the only island where the territory was divided into separate captaincies:

1. 1450–1466 — Jácome de Bruges. This captain disappeared mysteriously, with the suggestion that he was murdered, thrown overboard while at sea, during a voyage. Contrary to the Mental Law that favoured legitimate male heirs, in 1450, Prince Henry the Navigator permitted his first-born daughter to inherit the Terceirense Captaincy. What followed was a long process, in which his son-in-law, Duarte Paim, claimed the captaincy, over the claims of Álvaro Martins Homem and João Vaz Corte-Real. This process was decided in favor of the latter, but after some pleading on the part of both men, the island was divided into two captaincies.
2. 1466–1474 — Álvaro Martins Homem. Due to constant quarrelling between Homem and Corte Real, the island was divided into two captaincies by charter of Infanta D. Brites, tutor and curator of the donatary, from 17 February 1474. The island was roughly divided diagonally, and following long disputres, it was fixed in 1568, parting from the southern coast at the mouth of the Ribeira Seca, São Sebastião, crossed the island until the Cerro da Ribeira dos Gatos, near the northern coast (along the Canada da Almas, near Cruz do Marco, in Altares). In this area, a commission of "good men" of navigation, established a mark to distinguish the division, giving rise the locality. The post survived until 1997–1998, when alterations to the regional roadway resulted in its destruction. Having selected the territory of Angra, João Vaz Corte Real compensated Álvaro Martins Homem for the public works completed by the latter.

==== Captaincy of Angra ====
The captaincy of Angra was created on 2 April 1474, under the stewardship of João Vaz Corte-Real (was bestowed on him, in recognition of his "many and great services"), who promoted the settlement of many nobles from the Kingdom, many in company of their servants and entourage. In the process he opened new roads and established settlements in different points of the western part of the island, until by 1478, most of Angra was built, meriting its elevation to the category of vila (town).

For the island's defense, Corte-Real erected the Castle of São Luís (also known as the Castelo dos Moinhos), which became the first presidium, concluded in 1493, at the same concluding the Church of São Salvador. In order to attend the poor and sick of the captaincy, as well as those who docked in Angra, he built the first hospital on the island, to the invocation of Santo Espírito. The building was attended by the Franciscans and approved in the regal charter on 15 May 1492. Corte-Real also supported the construction of the Convent of São Francisco, and permitted the Franciscans to begin teaching on its grounds.

1. 1474–1496 — João Vaz Corte-Real;
2. 1496–1538 — Vasco Anes Corte-Real;
3. 1538–1577 — Manuel Corte-Real;
4. 1577–1581 — Vasco Annes Corte-Real, with same name as his grandfather;
5. 1581–1613 — Margarida Corte-Real, who married Cristóvão de Moura, 1st Count of Castelo Rodrigo, then 1st Marquess of Castelo Rodrigo, assuming the captaincy;
6. 1613–1642 — Manuel de Moura, 2nd Marquis of Castelo Rodrigo and 1st Count of Lumiares. The captaincy reverted to the crown in 1641, when Manuel de Moura Corte Real opted to remain in the Kingdom of Castille after the Restoration of Independence from Spain;
7. 1641–1642 — the title was incorporated into the possessions and properties of the Crown;
8. 1642–1649 — Afonso de Portugal, 5th Count of Vimioso and 1st Marquess of Aguiar;
9. 1649–1655 — Luís de Portugal, 6th Count of Vimioso; with his death, the title reverted, once again, to the Crown;
10. 1655–1766 — the title was re-incorporated into the possessions and properties of the Crown; the captaincy was extinguished with the creation of the Captaincy-General of the Azores.

==== Captaincy of Praia ====
The captaincy was received by Álvaro Martins Homem on 17 February 1474, receiving compensation from Corte Real for his works, which he then used to erect eight mills in Agualva and three in Quatro Ribeiras, and construction of churches within this captaincy. The vigorous impulse resulted in the quick elevation of Praia to the status of town between 1478 and 1480, at about the same time as Angra.

To complement the islands defenses Homem determined the need to construct a wall, and later, encircled the Bay of Praia with a series of redoubts, visioning a defense of the island from the sea.

Meanwhile, within Praia, Afonso Gonçalves de Antona Baldaya provided incentives for the construction of the Convent of São Francisco, including the donation of parcels from his own property, similar to what occurred in Angra. Influenced by inciative of Catarina de Ornelas, the Monastery of Luz was founded in this territory.

1. 1474–1483 — Álvaro Martins Homem;
2. 1483–1520 — Antão Martins Homem;
3. 1520–1540 — Álvaro Martins Homem, with same name as his grandfather;
4. 1540–1577 — Antão Martins da Câmara, with same name as his grandfather;
5. 1577–1582 — unknown
6. 1582–1613 — Margarida Corte-Real, who married Cristóvão de Moura, 1st Count of Castelo Rodrigo, later 1st Marquess of Castelo Rodrigo, who assumed the captaincy;
7. 1613–1642 — Manuel de Moura Corte-Real, 2nd Marquess of Castelo Rodrigo and 1st Count of Lumiares; The captaincy reverted to the crown in 1641, when Manuel de Moura Corte Real opted to remain in the Kingdom of Castille after the Restoration of Independence from Spain;
8. 1641–1642 — the title was incorporated into the possessions and properties of the Crown;
9. 1642–1649 — Afonso de Portugal, 5th Count of Vimioso and 1st Marquess of Aguiar;
10. 1649–1655 — Luís de Portugal, 6th Count of Vimioso; with his death, the title reverted, once again, to the Crown;
11. 1655–1663 — the title was re-incorporated into the possessions and properties of the Crown;
12. 1663–1665 — Francisco Ornelas da Câmara, who acquired the captaincy for 20,000 cruzados, during the Restoration Wars;
13. 1665–1712 — Brás de Ornelas, with the death of this title-holder, the captaincy reverted to the Crown, where it remained until 1715;
14. 1712–1715 — the title was re-incorporated into the possessions and properties of the Crown;
15. 1715–1749 — Luís António de Basto Baharem, the last private title-holder of the captaincy;
16. 1749–1766 — the title was re-incorporated into the possessions and properties of the Crown; the captaincy was extinguished with the creation of the Captaincy-General of the Azores.

=== Donatary-Captaincy of Graciosa ===
The captaincy of Graciosa was created in 1470, the year that official settlement was initiated, although it is unclear who were the first donatary captains:

==== Captaincy of Praia da Graciosa ====
1. 1470–1475 — (unclear date) Duarte Barreto do Couto, just the southern part of the island;
2. 1475–1485 — Vasco Gil Sodré (nobleman and relative of Pedro Correia da Cunha) (unclear dates; included the southern portions of the island and group of territories administered by his sister Antónia Sodré, widow of captain Duarte Barreto do Couto.

==== Captaincy of Santa Cruz ====
1. 1475–1485 — (unclear date) Pedro Correia da Cunha.

==== Captaincy of Graciosa ====
1. 1485–1497 — Pedro Correia da Cunha;(was a nobleman in the House of Henry the navigator)
2. 1499–1507 — Duarte Correia da Cunha, son of the preceding captain;
3. 1507–1510 — Fernando Coutinho (owing to no descendants of the Cunha family, the captaincy was passed to another branch of the family tree);
4. 1510–1524 — Álvaro Coutinho;
5. 1524–1552 — Álvaro Coutinho, son of the preceding;
6. 1552–1573 — Fernando Coutinho, son of the preceding;
7. 1573–1593 — Fernando Coutinho, son of the preceding;
8. 1593–1626 — Fernando Coutinho, son of the preceding;
9. 1626–1666 — Fernando Coutinho, son of the preceding, died without any descendants;
10. 1666–1674 — Luís Mendes de Elvas (died without descendants);
11. 1674–1708 — Pedro Sanches de Farinha;
12. 1708–1730 — Rodrigo Sanches Farinha de Baena;
13. 1730–1737 — Pedro Sanches Farinha de Baena;
14. 1737–1766 — the title was re-incorporated into the possessions and properties of the Crown; the captaincy was extinguished with the creation of the Captaincy-General of the Azores.

=== Donatary-Captaincy of São Jorge ===
The captaincy of São Jorge was annexed to that of Angra, and maintained in that form until it was incorporated by the Crown, after Manuel de Moura Corte-Real, donatary captain of Angra, decided to maintain his allegiance to Spain, following the Restoration Wars.

1. 1474–1496 — João Vaz Corte-Real;
2. 1496–1538 — Vasco Anes Corte-Real;
3. 1538–1577 — Manuel Corte-Real;
4. 1577–1581 — Vasco Annes Corte-Real, with same name as his grandfather;
5. 1581–1613 — Margarida Corte-Real, who married Cristóvão de Moura, 1st Count of Castelo Rodrigo, then 1st Marquess of Castelo Rodrigo, assuming the captaincy;
6. 1613–1642 — Manuel de Moura Corte-Real, 2nd Marquess of Castelo Rodrigo and 1st Count of Lumiares. The captaincy reverted to the crown in 1641, when Manuel de Moura Corte Real opted to remain in the Kingdom of Castille after the Restoration of Independence from Spain;
7. 1641–1642 — the title was incorporated into the possessions and properties of the Crown;
8. 1642–1649 — Afonso de Portugal, 5th Count of Vimioso and 1st Marquess of Aguiar;
9. 1649–1655 — Luís de Portugal, 6th Count of Vimioso; with his death, the title reverted, once again, to the Crown;
10. 1655–1766 — the title was re-incorporated into the possessions and properties of the Crown; the captaincy was extinguished with the creation of the Captaincy-General of the Azores.

=== Donatary-Captaincy of Faial and Pico ===
==== Captaincy of Faial ====
1. 1468–1482 — Josse van Huerter. The Donatary-captaincy of Faial was given to Josse van Huerter by charter date 21 February 1468, which was then expanded on 29 December 1482, with the incorporation of the island of Pico

==== Captaincy of Pico ====
1. 1460–1482 — Álvaro de Ornelas. Around 1460, Álvaro de Ornelas attempted to settle the island, with colonists from northern Portugal, who arrived by way of Terceira and Graciosa. In a letter written 1481, the Infanta D. Beatriz, acting as Donatário for her underage sons said so much, indicating that she had ceded the island to Álvaro de Ornelas, one of the king's squires and resident of Madeira, so he could promote the settlement of the mountain-island. Yet, he never really took effective control of thedonatary. Confronted with the inefficiency of this nobleman, the Infanta withdrew her support, and gave the captaincy to Jós Dutra (whose family had already distinguished itself in developing Faial).

==== Captaincy of Faial and Pico ====
By charter, on 29 December 1482, the Captaincy of Pico was annexed to the Captaincy of Faial, created the dual jurisdiction, under the single regency of van Huerter.

1. 1482–1495 — Josse van Huerter;
2. 1495–1549 — Joss de Utra, son of the preceding (transliterated name);
3. 1549–1553 — Manuel de Utra Corte Real;
4. 1553–1573 — Álvaro de Castro.
5. 1573–1582 — Francisco de Mascarenhas;
6. 1582–1614 — Jerónimo de Utra Corte Real; in the 16th century, the town of Lajes do Pico asked the King to command Captain Jerónimo Dutra Corte Real to perform his duties and to assume his place in the Captaincy;
7. 1614–1642 — Manuel de Moura Corte Real, 1st Marquess of Lumiares and 2nd Marquess of Castelo Rodrigo. After being confiscated, the captaincy was incorporated into the possessions and properties of the Crown, between 1642 and 1680, since Manuel opted to live in the Kingdom of Castille, following the Restoration Wars;
8. 1680–1730 — Rodrigo Sanches Farinha de Baena;
9. 1730–1737 — Pedro Sanches Farinha de Baena, following his death, the captaincy was reincorporated into the possessions and properties of the Crown, by Rodrigo Sanches Farinha de Baena;
10. 1825–1832 — Manuel de Arriaga Pereira, the title remained an honorific, until the captaincy was permanently extinguished with the creation of the Captaincy-General of the Azores.

=== Donatary-Captaincy of Flores and Corvo ===
The islands of Flores and Corvo, were since their discovery, administered as a singular captaincy, without any clear statute defining the governance on the islands. What developed was a structure that was not as equal as the other islands, and flowed from a feudal hierarchy, that only improved after the reforms of Mouzinho da Silveira and the extinction of the constitutional monarchy. The following were the doantary captains of the islands:

1. Diogo de Teive, was the Donatary, and not the Donatary Captain of the islands, responsible for their discovery;
2. ????–1475 — João de Teive, son of the preceding, who sold his rights to the group (with the permission of the Crown) to Fernão Teles de Meneses;
3. 1475–1477 — Fernão Teles de Meneses, 4th Master of Unhão;
4. 1477–1500 — Maria de Vilhena, who, in the name of her minor son (Rui Teles), administered the islands; she invited, or permitted, the settlement of Willem van der Hagen, also known locally as Guilherme da Silveira, who for many years lived on the island, near Ribeira da Cruz. Ultimately, with the approval of her son, Maria de Vilhena sold the islands in 1500 to João da Fonseca, of Évora;
5. 1500–1528 — João da Fonseca, sent to the islands some of the earliest settlers that remained on the islands, including Lopo Vaz and Antão Vaz;
6. 1528–1570 — Pero da Fonseca, sometimes referred to as Pedro da Fonseca, son of the preceding;
7. 1570–1593 — friar Gonçalo de Sousa da Fonseca, son of the preceding; professed knight in the Order of Christ. During this period the Commandery of the Order of Christ was founded, to administer through the Donatary Captain, what consisted of "[the] dominion of all the lands of the named islands not already occupied, with the obligation of paying annually a physical quantity of 20$00 réis, to care for the provision and payment of ecclesiastical ministers, to promote and support the construction and conservancy of the parochial churches and all in respect of the religious cult" and "...with the island of Corvo least occupied, took to the Commandery almost all, and on the island of Flores, took the extensive unincorporated lands in the municipality of Santa Cruz and three in Lajes". It was this Commandery that resulted in the oppression of the peoples of both islands, resulting in an oppressive signeurial tribute, that was only resolved in the 19th century. Through the death of friar Gonçalo da Fonseca the captaincy reverted to the Crown, and later attributed to Francisco de Mascarenhas, for his services in India and awarded for his support of the Iberian Union;
8. 1593–1607 — Francisco de Mascarenhas, 1st Count of Vila da Horta, later changed to 1st Count of Santa Cruz, by letter of thanks from Filipe I, on 17 September 1523. All the remaining captains, except the last, were members of the Mascarenhas family, Counts of Santa Cruz, accumulating other titles along the way.
9. 1608–1650 — Martinho de Mascarenhas, 2nd Count of Santa Cruz;
10. 1650–1657 — João de Mascarenhas, married to his cousin, Brites de Mascarenhas, only daughter of the 2nd Count of Santa Cruz. João de Mascarenhas lost his title and captaincy to his son, Martinho de Mascarenhas, declared 4th Count of Santa Cruz, after being removed by King Afonso VI on 30 June 1657;
11. 1657–1682 — Martinho de Mascarenhas, married Juliana de Lencastre, daughter and successor of the 2nd Marquess of Gouveia, accumulating the title of Count of Santa Cruz and Marquess of Gouveia within his household;
12. 1682–1692 — João de Mascarenhas, 5th Count of Santa Cruz and 4th Marquess of Gouveia, died without any descendants;
13. 1692–1714 — Martinho Mascarenhas, second oldest son of the 4th Count of Santa Cruz, and wife Juliana de Lencastre, he used the title of 6th Count of Santa Cruz, later confirmed by regal charter on 2 July 1692, and 3rd Marquess of Gouveia;
14. 1714–1723 — João de Mascarenhas, 7th Count of Santa Cruz, by regal letter of John V (dated 20 January 1714), confirmed in 1723, and 4th Marquess of Gouveia. He was the eldest son of the 6th Count of Santa Cruz, but renounced the title, and escaped to England, for romantic reasons;
15. 1723–1759 — D. José de Mascarenhas da Silva e Lencastre, 5th Marquess of Gouveia, 8th Count of Santa Cruz, and 8th Duke of Aveiro, obtained his title, owing to João de Mascarenhas had renounced his role. José was the last titleholder of the captaincy from the Mascarenhas family, since the title and his possessions/properties were confiscated by the Crown, during the sequence of events surrounding the Távora affair. The last Count of Santa Cruz was condemned and executed on 13 January 1759, and the politico-administrative responsibilities of Donatary Captain ceased on the islands;
16. 1815–1832 — Pedro José Caupers, following the death of José de Mascarenhas, the incomes and possessions were administered by Pedro José Caupers, until the captaincy was ultimately extinguished with the creation of the Captaincy-General of the Azores.
