= House of Cámara =

Iberian aristocratic family

- Noble family
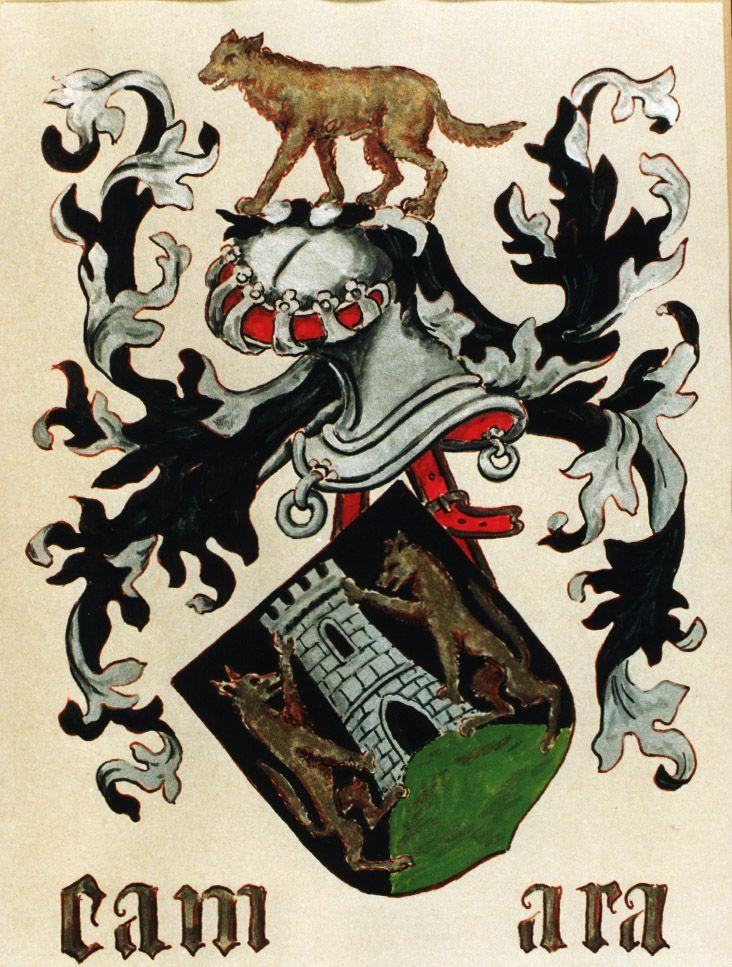
- The Coat of arms of the House of Cámara as depicted in the Livro do Armeiro-Mor, the oldest and most important roll of arms of the Kingdom of Portugal, circa 1520.
- Place of origin: Alcalá de Henares, Spain (Kingdom of Castile)
- Founded: 1227 (799 years ago)
- Founder: Gonzalo de la Cámara (Spanish branch); João Gonçalves da Câmara (Zarco) (Portuguese branch); Juan de la Cámara (Yucatecan branch)
- Titles: Count of Calheta (1576); Count of Vila Franca (1583); Count of Ribeira Grande (1662); Marquis de Castelho Melhor (1766); Count of Taipa (1823); Marquis of Ribeira Grande (1855); Count of Canavial (1880)

The House of Cámara (also known in Spanish as de la Cámara or in Portuguese as da Câmara or Gonçalves da Câmara) is an aristocratic family with a rich history in Spain, Portugal and Mexico.

Gonzalo de la Cámara was elevated to knighthood after fighting under the command of King Ferdinand III of Castile during the Battle of Baeza in 1227. Throughout the following centuries, they continued to serve the Spanish Crown, participating in battles during the Reconquista, a series of military campaigns to reclaim the Iberian Peninsula from Muslim rule. The family's noble status was further confirmed by Ferdinand the Catholic and Joanna I of Castile. Although Gonzalo de la Cámara originated from Alcalá de Henares, some of his descendants settled in Galicia and Portugal. One of the most notable members of this lineage was Juan Rodríguez de la Cámara, a 15th-century man of letters born in Padrón, Galicia.

A separate family with a similar occupational name was established in the Kingdom of Portugal, (the coat of arms represented in this page is only of the Portuguese family) with direct lineage traced back to João Gonçalves da Câmara (Zarco), the discoverer and conqueror of Madeira. From the 15th century until the end of the Donataries' regime, they held the hereditary title of Captain-Major (Capitães dos Donatários) on the island of São Miguel in the Azores. During the War of the Portuguese Succession, the Câmara family supported Philip II's claim to the throne, helping him win the Battle of Vila Franco do Campo and carry out the Iberian Union. Honored by the Portuguese Crown, the family was bestowed various noble titles, including Counts of Calheta (1576), Count of Vila Franca (1583), Count of Ribeira Grande (1662), Marquis of Castelo Melhor (1766), Count of Taipa (1823), Marquis of Ribeira Grande (1855), and Count of Canavial (1880), among others. This influence was manifested in the Livro do Armeiro-Mor, an important Portuguese armorial that included the coats of arms of royalty and major noble families of Europe. The Portuguese branch of the family also settled in the Azores, and for centuries its members held positions of power and government in these islands. In 1583, Philip II of Spain acknowledged their support during the Portuguese War of Succession. The Câmara family maintained an influential presence in Portuguese politics and society until the collapse of the monarchy in 1910, when noble titles were abolished. João da Câmara, a playwright and the son of the 8th Count of Ribeira Grande, was nominated for the Nobel Prize in Literature in 1901, reflecting the extent of their cultural legacy.

In Mexico, the Cámara family has a history that dates back to 1542 when Juan de la Cámara, a key figure in the Spanish conquest of Yucatán, contributed to the foundation of Mérida. As part of the criollo aristocracy in the Viceroyalty of New Spain, they held prominence and privilege, solidifying their status as major landowners, becoming part of the Mexican nobility. Strategic marriages with other descendants of conquistadors established them as a distinct social caste, preserving their European heritage. Their ownership of Cancún and its surroundings further demonstrated their enduring influence. Between 1870 and 1920, the henequen industry in Yucatán boomed as sisal fiber was in high demand in international markets during the Second Industrial Revolution. Raymundo Cámara Luján, along with other family members, played a significant role in the region's economic expansion during this period. The Cámara family formed part of the gente decente, the traditional upper class families, which at the turn of the century became among the wealthiest in the Americas. In the political arena, the Cámara family also had a notable connection to Maderism, as evidenced by the marriage of María Cámara Vales to José María Pino Suárez, the Vice President of Mexico between 1911 and his assassination in 1913 during the tumultuous events of the Ten Tragic Days. With the Mexican Revolution and subsequent agrarian reform, the family's extensive land holdings were expropriated, leading to a decline in their influence and power. Nevertheless, descendants of the family have excelled in various fields, including business, politics, culture, law, and diplomacy throughout the 20th century.

== History ==
The origins of the family date back to 1227 when Gonzalo de la Cámara, a military officer, was ennobled by orders of King Ferdinand III of Castile, thus recognizing his outstanding participation in the surrender of Baeza by the Moors.

Although Gonzalo de la Cámara was originally from Alcalá de Henares, his descendants settled in Galicia, in the north of Spain; One of the most distinguished was Juan Rodríguez de la Cámara, a poet from the late 15th century who was born in Padrón, a municipality in the Galician province of La Coruña. Speaking about his family origins, the Spanish Royal Academy of History (Real Academia de la Historia) tells us that his "family name, Cámara, appears registered in the tomb of the main local church, he must have been born in the Galician town of his last name or in its vicinity in the last years of the fourteenth century, in a family belonging to the nobility."

=== Portuguese branch ===
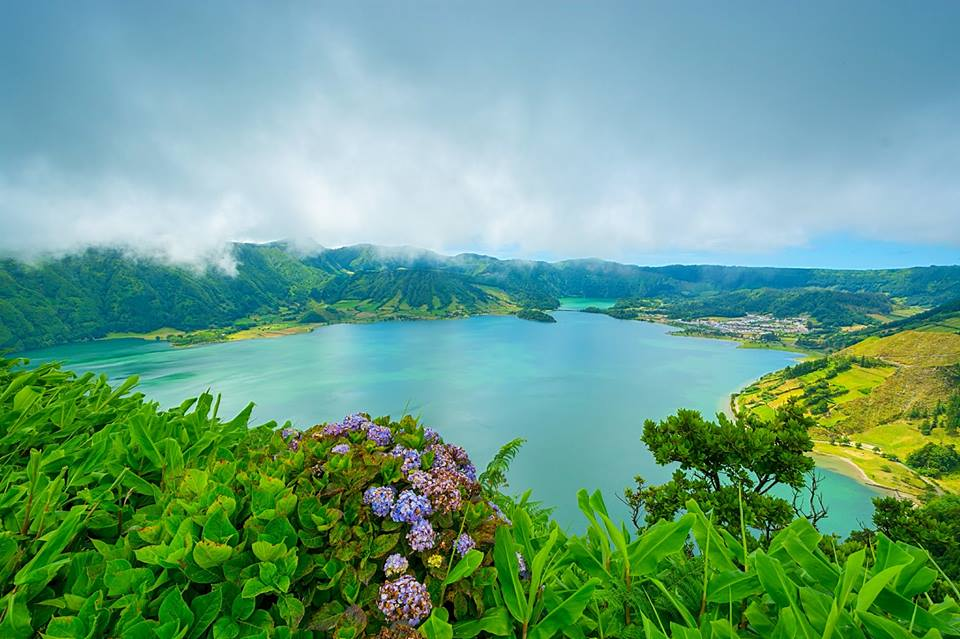
São Miguel, the largest island in the Azores, was governed by the family between the 15th and 18th centuries.

Over time, a branch of the family settled in the neighboring Kingdom of Portugal. In 1420, João Gonçalves da Câmara (Zarco), a descendant of this line, discovered the Archipelago of Madeira.

For many centuries, the family maintained the hereditary title of Captain-Major (Capitães dos Donatários) of the island of São Miguel in the Azores. Similarly, for five hundred years, until the dissolution of the Portuguese monarchy in 1910, his descendants held no less than 2 marquisate, 5 countships and a lordship, becoming one of the most important noble families of the Kingdom of Portugal. By 1520, the heraldry of the family was already represented in the Livro do Armeiro-Mor, the oldest and most important armorial of the Kingdom of Portugal that included the arms of royalty and the main noble families of Europe.

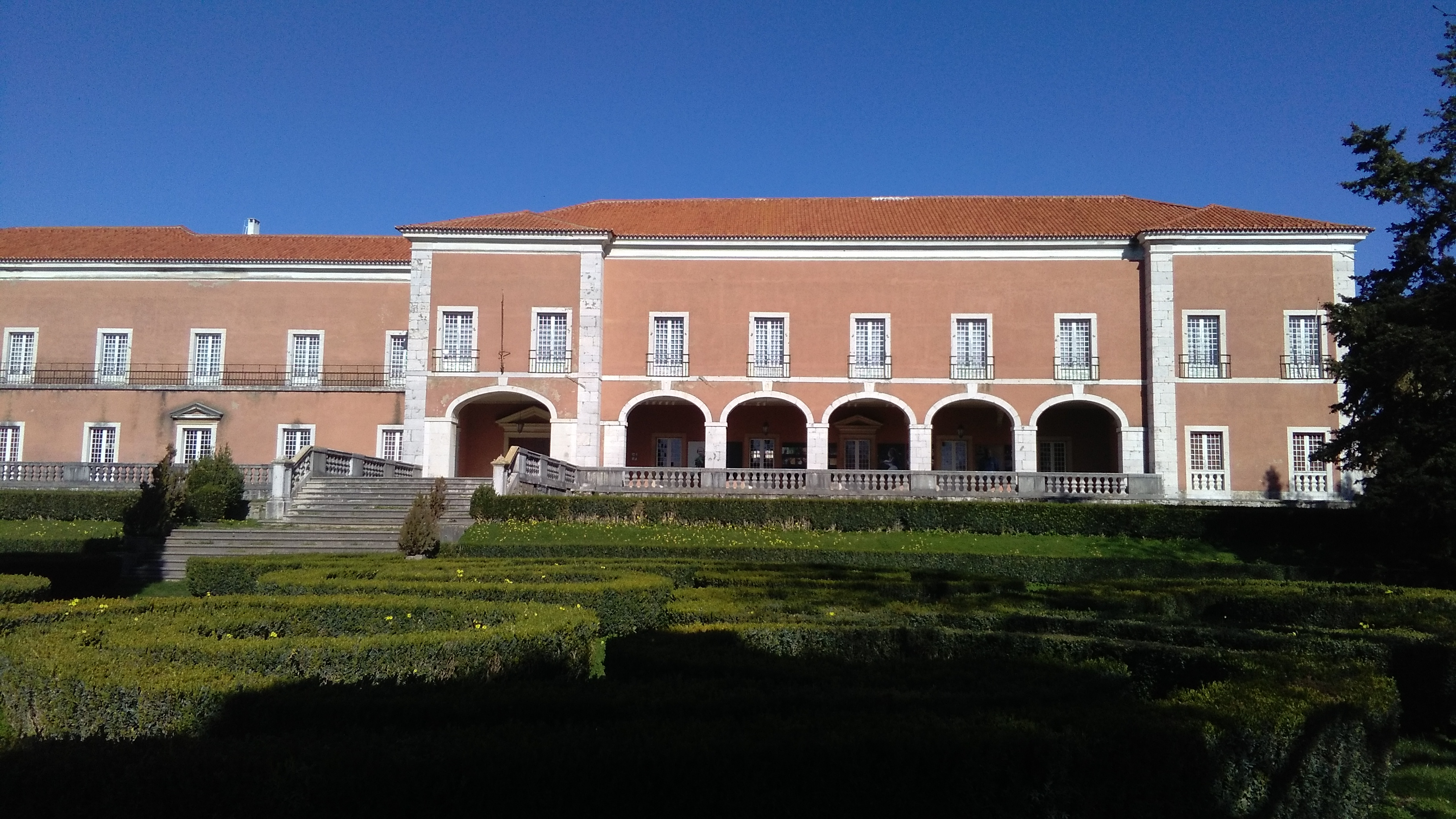
Built in the 17th century, the Palace of the Counts of Calheta was the residence of the Camara family in Lisbon.

In 1573, the captain of São Miguel, Manuel da Câmara passed on the administration of the island to his son Rui Gonçalves da Câmara (the third such Rui in the family), and went to live in Lisbon until his death in 1578, at a time when the reign of the Cardinal King was nearing its end. Following the king's death several pretenders lined-up to assume the monarchy, including Philip II of Spain, António, Prior of Crato and the Infanta Catherine, Duchess of Braganza, among others. But, it was the conflict between António and Philip II that took centre stage: following António's defeat at the Battle of Alcântra, he remained king in only the Azores (barring São Miguel, where the nobles were indifferent to the monarch).

Rui, meanwhile, following his father's death had chosen to remain in Lisbon, and was there when the continent fell to Philip II. He aligned himself, and by association, his family to the Philippine succession. For his part, King Philip conceded to him, the title of Count of Vila Franca. At the time, the Countship was the highest honorific title that the King could bestow on a Portuguese citizen, especially one that was not his own son. There were few counts in Portugal, and many of them were wealthy and powerful. The selection of the designation was specifically chosen to privilege the nobles of the island of São Miguel, where the provincial capital had been of Vila Franca do Campo until 1522.

Yet, the municipal authorities at the time did not appreciate that D. Rui was named Count in their name, since that title was conferred by a Spanish King. Philip II undeterred responded that the title was merely honorific, and that the title did not transgress any of the rights and privileges of the "citizens" of the town.

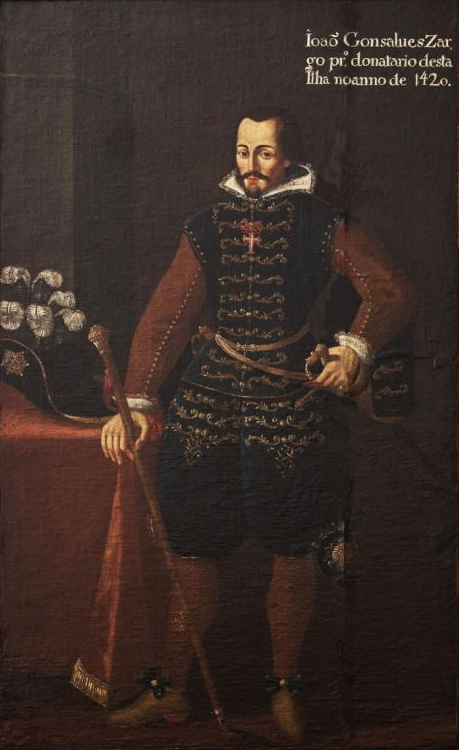
João Gonçalves de Camara (Zarco), discovered Madeira in 1419.

Rui da Câmara eventually arrived in his countship along with a second fleet, ordered to the archipelago to conquer the island of Terceira, which had held out (along with other islands) the acclamation of Philip as King of Portugal. This began a period of unified power in the Azores under the flag of Spain, that would continue until the Restoration of Portuguese independence. In the meantime, the Gonçalves da Câmara line enjoyed privileges in the Azores, under successive Captains-Donataráios and Counts of Vila Franca.

In the aftermath of the succession of John IV to the throne, many of the islands of the Azores acclaimed the monarch and Rodrigo da Câmara, 3rd Count of Vila Franca, eventually accepted his reign following the defeat of the Spanish at the fortress of Terceira and a personal letter from John IV. Rodrigo kept his titles and privileges following the defeat, but, in 1650, the Inquisition investigated and arrested the Count from several complaints raised against him associated with sexual escapades. His possessions, privileges and titles were confiscated and his family's position was in crisis: the noble eventually died a miserable death in the Convent of Cape St. Vincent in 1601. Although his wife was unable to liberate her husband, she was able to influence the King into restoring their family honours and possessions following her husband's death, thanks to her family connections as descendant of Vasco da Gama. Her son was the direct beneficiary of this warming of ties. Owing to the tarnished nature of the Countship of Vila Franca, it was decided by the King to substitute Ribeira Grande for the blemished former provincial title. The use of Vila Franca had already been a polemic decision in the first place, since Philip II of Spain had not consulted the Portuguese before instituting the honorific.

On the initiative of the Marquis of Pombal, King José I of Portugal signed a decree on August 2, 1766 creating the Captaincy General of the Azores, based in Angra do Heroísmo. The Captain General now governed the entire civil, judicial, and military service of the archipelago. By that same decree, the Captains were abolished, ending more than three hundred years of history. However, the family continued to hold their other noble titles until the establishment of the Portuguese Republic in 1910. João da Câmara, a playwright and son of the 8th Count of Ribeira Grande, was the first Portuguese citizen to be nominated for the Nobel Prize for Literature. in 1901.

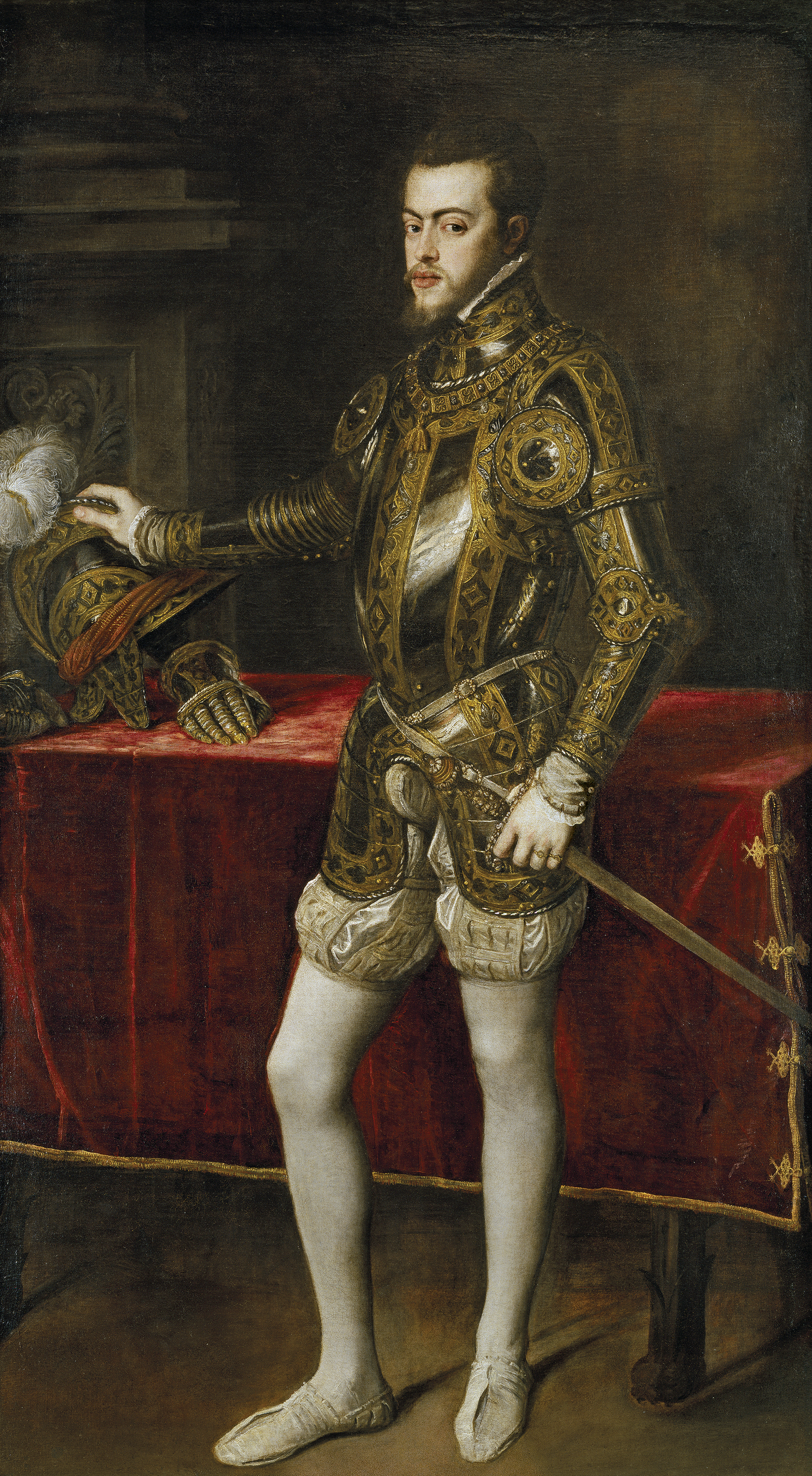
Philip II of Spain ascended to the throne of Portugal in 1580, uniting the Portuguese and Spanish Empires. His claim to the throne, however, was disputed during the War of the Portuguese Succession (1580–83). After securing his throne after the battle of Vila Franca do Campo, Felipe II recognized the support that the Câmara family had given him during the conflict by granting them the Countship of Vila Franca.

==== List of counts of Vila Franca ====
1. Rui Gonçalves da Câmara, 1st Count of Vila Franca (1578–1601)
2. Manuel da Câmara, 2nd Count of Vila Franca (1601–1619)
3. Rodrigo da Câmara, 3rd Count of Vila Franca (1619–1662)
4. Manuel da Câmara, 4th Count of Vila Franca (1662–1673)

==== List of counts of Ribeira Grande ====
- D. Manuel Luís Baltazar da Câmara, 1st Count of Ribeira Grande (1630–1675);
- D. José Rodrigo da Câmara, 2nd Count of Ribeira Grande (1665–1724);
- D. Luís Manuel da Câmara, 3rd Count of Ribeira Grande (1685–1723);
- D. José da Câmara, 4th Count of Ribeira Grande (1712–1757);
- D. Guido Augusto da Câmara e Ataíde, 5th Count of Ribeira Grande (1718–1770);
- D. Luís António José Maria da Câmara, 6th Count of Ribeira Grande (1754–1802);
- D. José Maria Gonçalves Zarco da Câmara, 7th Count of Ribeira Grande (1784–1820);

==== List of marquess of Ribeira Grande ====
- D. Francisco de Sales Gonçalves Zarco da Câmara, 8th Count of Ribeira Grande (1819–1872), created 1st Marquis of Ribeira Grande by decree of King Pedro V of Portugal, issued on September 5, 1855
- D. José Maria Gonçalves Zarco da Câmara, 9th Count of Ribeira Grande (1843–1907);
- D. Vicente de Paula Gonçalves Zarco da Câmara, 10th Count of Ribeira Grande (1875–1946);

==== Pretendants ====
Following the fall of the monarchy, the Republican government abolished noble and honorific titles. Yet, some of the descendants still maintained those honorific titles and claims, including: D. José Maria Gonçalves Zarco da Câmara; D. José Vicente Gonçalves Zarco da Câmara; and D. José Cabral Gonçalves Zarco da Câmara.

=== Mexican branch ===
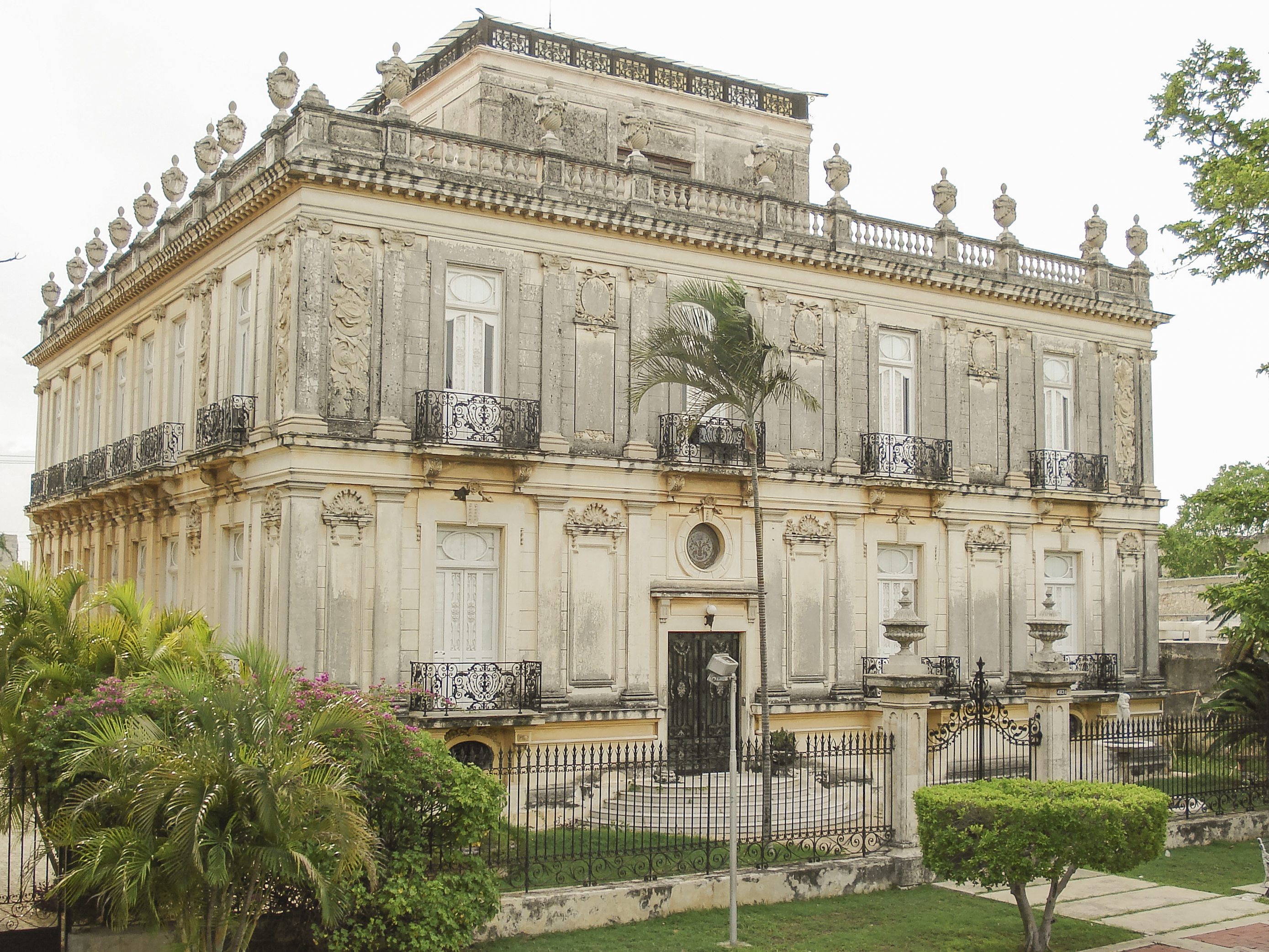
One of the Cámara Houses, a pair of townhouses built for the Cámara family in the Paseo de Montejo between 1908 and 1911. They were designed in the fashionable Beaux-Arts style by Gustave Umbdenstock, the French architect,

Juan de la Cámara, originally from Alcalá de Henares, arrived in the New World in 1539, accompanying Francisco de Montejo in the Spanish conquest of Yucatán. In 1542, during the establishment of the city of Mérida, all members of the first municipal council (cabildo) were of noble hidalgo status. Juan de la Cámara was one of the founders of Mérida, serving in the first municipal council as chief constable of the city (Alguacil Mayor) and later, also as its mayor.

In Spain, hidalguía was a status within the nobility that bestowed certain privileges and tax exemptions upon its holders. During the Spanish conquest of the Aztec Empire led by Hernán Cortés, the majority of the conquerors did not belong to the hidalgo class. Conversely, during the conquest of Yucatán, the directive of King Charles I of Spain was followed, granting the benefits of the conquest exclusively to the hidalgos. In Yucatán, documentary evidence of hidalguía ("probanzas") was required to hold civil positions. Hidalgos received land and encomiendas as rewards for their service.

One notable aspect of the Cámara family's history is their ability to prove, through probanzas, their connection to medieval nobility which further enhanced their status and lineage:

"The Cámara family is a special case, perhaps in all of Latin America: a family that has prevailed from the early moments of the Colonial era to the present day. Don Juan de la Cámara arrived in these lands with Montejo, which is why the Cámara family is the oldest criollo family in Yucatán. They had great relevance during the Colonial times and also had significant influence in the 19th century. Don Juan de la Cámara was able to prove that one of his ancestors, Alfonso Ruiz de la Cámara, had been knighted [...] For many years, the Cámara family owned Cancún and its surroundings, which is now home to one of the most important tourist destinations in the Caribbean."

Through strategic intermarriages with other descendants of conquistadors and hidalgos, the Cámara family formed a distinct social caste, marrying the descendants of figures such as Francisco de Montejo, Gaspar and Melchor Pacheco, Andrés Dorantes de Carranza, and Francisco de Solís, who served as governor of Puerto Rico and Yucatán.

"A genealogical study of the different landowning families [...] demonstrates to what extent they formed a caste within the Yucatecan society, and to what extent, they had consciousness of belonging to a privileged group [...] throughout the centuries, they were a separate group [...] With the study of the documents referring to concessions of encomiendas, we were able to glimpse from the beginning the existence of a criollo aristocracy. But as we progress in our investigations, we realized that what actually existed was a small and closed oligarchy that, by the practice of endogamy, had managed to keep their distinguished antecedents even enriching them through new connections to the descendants of other conquistadores [...] it is curious and interesting to observe how all families are closely linked to each other, to the point of being all directly or indirectly related. What is significant is that the vast majority of all these families can boast descent from the most prominent conquistadores [...] Apparently, it seems logical that all the criollo inhabitants of Yucatan descended from the first conquistadores. But what is no longer so normal [...] is that of all the men who distinguished themselves in the conquest of Yucatan — Francisco de Montejo, Gaspar and Melchor Pacheco, Juan de Magaña, Juan de la Cámara, [...] etc. — only very few stand out as common ancestors of many of the Yucatecan families [...] The consequence is the same: a closed society that has defended at any cost its conquistador origin by marriage with other families with similar ancestry."

An example of these matrimonial alliances is the Cámara family's connection to Carlos de Arellano, a cavalry captain, who had fought in Flanders and France, and who was the first cousin of Doña Juana Ramírez de Arellano y Zúñiga, the wife of Hernán Cortés (Marquess of the Valley of Oaxaca) and niece of the Duke of Béjar. In 1562, Carlos de Arellano married Francisca Montejo y Castillo, the only daughter of the conquistador Francisco Montejo. Carlos de Arellano was also the great-grandson of Diego Hurtado de Mendoza, the first Duke of Infantado. Their daughter, Catalina Arellano Montejo, married Diego Solís Osorio in 1583. María Solís Casanova, a descendant of this marriage, married Antonio de la Cámara y Osorio in 1688. Through their descent from Carlos Arellano, the de la Cámara family can claim descent from the Houses of Mendoza and Arellano, two of the most aristocratic families in Spain. Among the most noteworthy members of the House of Mendoza, for example, is Cardinal Mendoza, a renowned Spanish statesman whose influence was such that he was called "the Third King" during the reign of Isabel and Fernando, the Catholic Monarchs of Spain. This intermingling of conquistador lineage and noble connections further solidified the Cámara family's place among the criollo aristocracy of colonial Mexico.

However, despite their noble lineage and contributions to the Spanish Empire, the Cámara family and other conquerors faced challenges in obtaining the rewards and recognition they believed they deserved after the conquest. The Spanish Crown was reluctant to grant noble titles in the New World, as it sought to prevent the development of a powerful nobility that could challenge its authority. It was only after much agitation by the conquistadors and their heirs, who felt displaced in the granting of offices and favors by the newcomers from Spain, that Charles V agreed in 1543 that those who had participated in the conquest of Mexico should be classified as "first and principal conquerors" and, by virtue of this, should be entitled to preferential treatment.

John Elliott, a history professor at the University of Oxford, noted that the Crown was also hesitant to reward the conquerors with land, resulting in only a small percentage of the European population in the Indies receiving large land grants. The descendants of the few conquerors that did, faced difficulties in maintaining their position and privileges. High attrition rates, caused by death or return to Spain, were common among the original landowners. Only 45 percent of the land granted in New Spain remained within the family beyond the first recipient. This meant that the initial "natural aristocracy" of Spanish America required continuous replenishment through newcomers who had the means or connections to acquire lands, encomiendas, or to marry into the families of the original conquerors. It is for this reason, that the Cámara family are considered a special case. Even without formal titles, they managed to become part of the landed aristocracy and have prevailed from the Conquest to the present day. During the Colonial period they became one of the most notable families of the Mexican nobility and one of the most important landowners in the Yucatán Peninsula, competing with the Peón family that arrived in Yucatán during the 18th century.

The Cámara family also held significant influence in the second half 19th century and early 20th century. During this period, Yucatán became the world's main producer of henequen fiber; out of its haciendas came 90% of the sacks and rope consumed internationally. Both goods were considered essential in the context of the Second Industrial Revolution and the naval arms races between the Great powers as the world prepared for World War I. Between 1870 and 1920, "[henequen] crossed all borders. It was sold everywhere: binder twine in the United States; silk in Germany and henequen sacks throughout the Americas. In other words, it almost became an article of first necessity in the entire world." By 1900, the United States, alone, was importing 81 million kilograms of henequen per annum. Indeed, "the wheat crops in the United States [...] sent so many dollars to the Yucatan Peninsula that it quickly became El Dorado." During this period, solely from the United States, henequen exports were generating revenue for Yucatán of roughly US$1.7 billion in 1900. Adjusted for inflation, this 1900 revenue would amount to approximately US$62 billion in 2023.

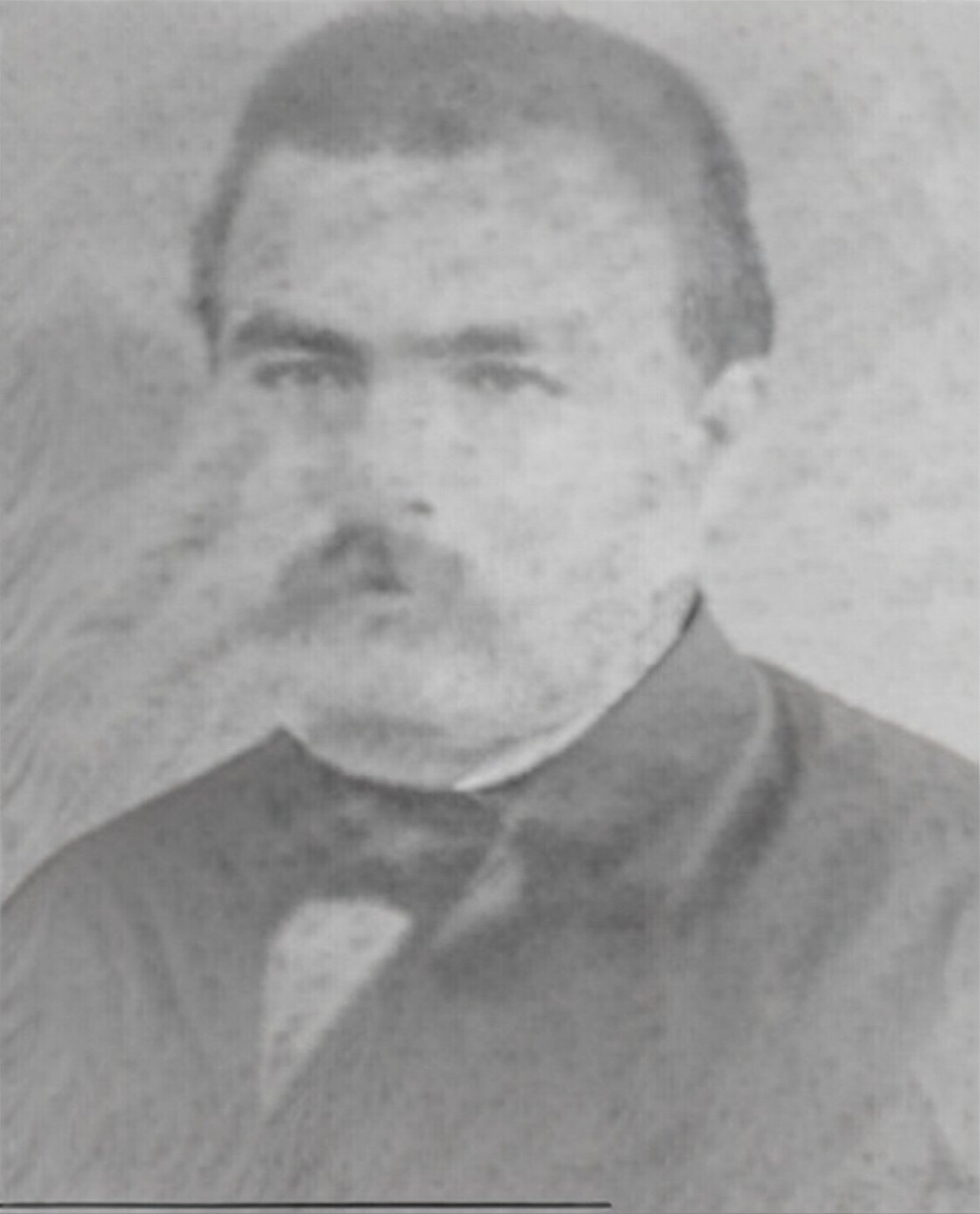
Raymundo Cámara, was a powerful landowner.

The boom rapidly transformed the Yucatan into the wealthiest and most industrialized region in Mexico at the turn of the century. In this context, "the traditional landowning families, owners of latifundios, encomiendas and estancias, whose prestige came from the colonial period, demonstrated a mysterious ability to adapt to the changing economic order." Various members of the Cámara family formed part of "a group of the 20 or 30 industrialists, who concentrated ownership of the land, were capable of producing 50% of the henequen, of controlling close to 90% of its trade, of directing, of course, the regional political destinies; in other words, they formed an oligarchy," also known as the Divine Caste, whose members forged "incalculable fortunes, placing them among the richest men in the Americas."

John Kenneth Turner, an American journalist, pointed out that families like the Cámara family, belonging to the Yucatecan oligarchy, "lived in expensive palaces in Mérida, and many of them have houses abroad. They travel a lot, usually speak multiple languages, and they and their families are a highly cultured class of people. The entire Yucatán Peninsula depends on [them]. Naturally, these men control the political machinery of their state and, naturally, operate the machinery for their own benefit." On the other hand, Gilbert Joseph, a history professor at Yale University, described the families that made up this oligarchy as a group that:

"elbowed their way confidently past bowing waiters to the roulette tables of San Remo with the silver Peruvians, the cattle-Argentines, and the steel Americans. French lessons became the rage in the best circles of local society and, once a year, a team of Parisian milliners and modistes visited Mérida to take orders from the grandest dames. At least once a year, Yucatecos made sure to polish their newly acquired linguistic skills and exhibit their sartorial splendor abroad, and local social columnists faithfully reported their European triumphs."

The descendants of Raymundo Cámara and other members of the family played a significant role in various fields that shaped the history and development of Mexico in the 20th century. His eldest daughter, María Cámara Vales, married José María Pino Suárez, who served as vice-president of Mexico between 1911 and his assassination in 1913, during the earlier stages of the Mexican Revolution. Two of his sons, Alfredo and Nicolás Cámara Vales served as governor of Quintana Roo and Yucatan, respectively. Similarly, another sister, Lucrecia Cámara Vales, was the wife of Calixto Maldonado, a distinguished lawyer, historian, former president of the Anti-Reelectionist National Party, and one of the main figures in Mexican Freemasonry. Likewise, María del Carmen Cámara Vales was the wife of Arcadio Zentella y Sánchez Mármol, a distinguished writer and journalist with a marked liberal and republican inclination. María del Pilar Ponce Cámara, a first cousin of the Cámara Vales family, was the wife of Serapio Rendón, a prominent Maderist military leader and politician who emerged as one of the main opponents of the military dictatorship of Huerta. After the assassination of Madero and Pino Suárez in February 1913, the family faced political persecution by the military dictatorship led by Victoriano Huerta, and many of its members had to go into exile in Europe and the United States. Many remained in exile throughout the revolutionary period.

Alfonso Cámara y Cámara was a conservative politician who served as lieutenant governor of Yucatán during the administration of Francisco Cantón. In 1902, Cantón proposed him as his successor, but Porfirio Díaz, the dictator who ruled Mexico for 30 years, favored the candidacy of his rival, Olegario Molina.

On the other hand, Gonzalo Cámara Zavala was a philanthropist, lawyer, essayist, and writer who founded the League of Social Action. His son, Carlos Cámara, was also a prominent troubadour and composer. The influence of the Cámara family manifested itself in the cultural and artistic sphere. Hortensia Cámara Vales and Pablo Castellanos León, his daughter and son-in-law, were a couple of concert pianists remembered for having introduced the French and German tradition of classical music to the Mexico Conservatory. Their only son, Pablo Castellanos Cámara, was also a concert pianist who, following in his father's footsteps, trained at the Paris and Berlin Conservatories under the supervision of Alfred Cortot and Edwin Fischer.

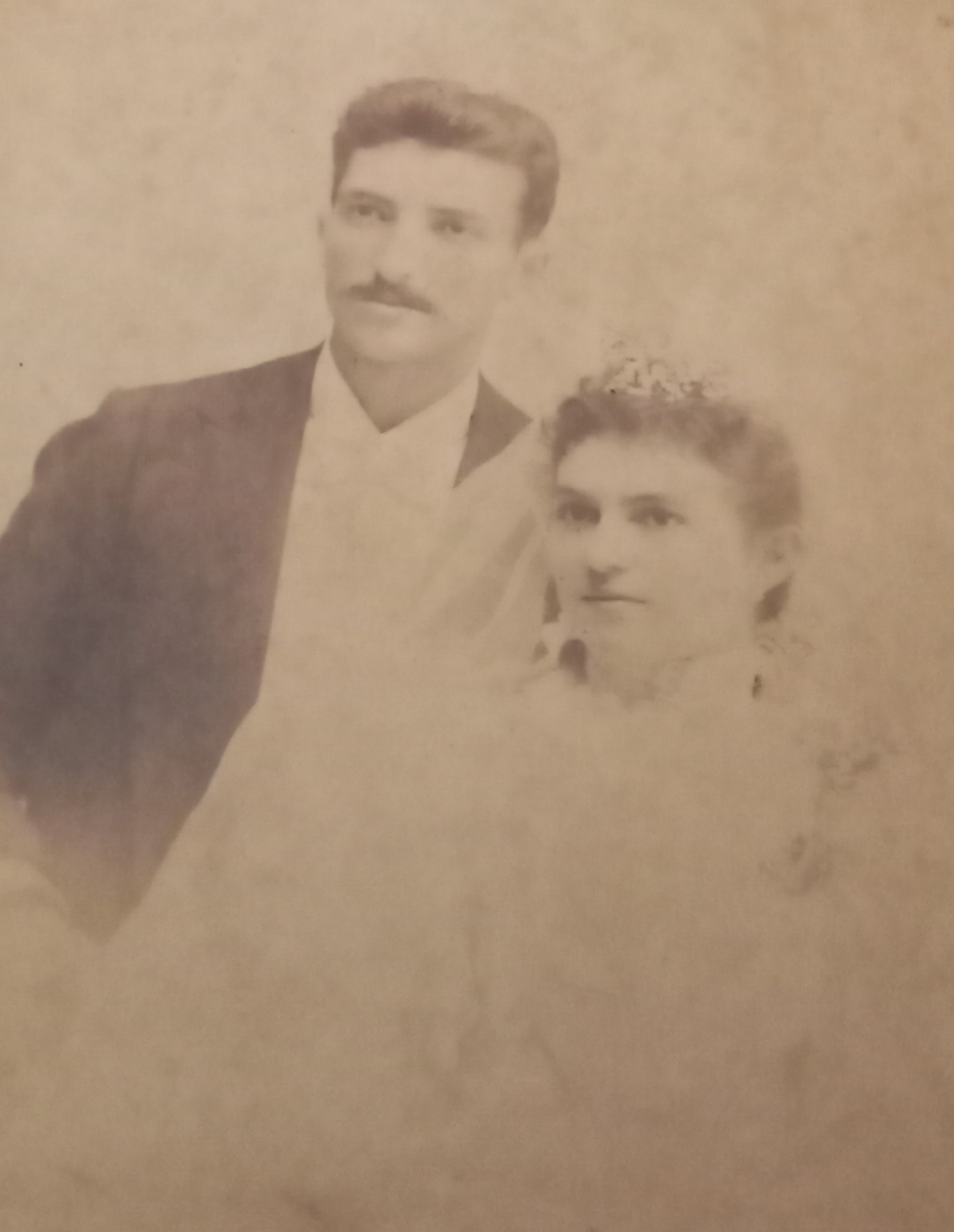
María Cámara Vales was married to José María Pino Suárez, vice-president of Mexico between 1911 and his assassination in 1913, during the Mexican Revolution.

Alfredo Pino Cámara, another grandson, was an associate justice of the Supreme Court of Justice who had achieved notoriety when he acted as the presiding judge in the criminal trial of Tina Modotti, the communist photographer accused of murdering Julio Antonio Mella, her lover and an exiled Cuban activist. Similarly, Fernando Cámara Barbachano was a social anthropologist and museologist linked to the INAH. Finally, Raymundo's great-grandson, Ismael Moreno Pino, was one of the diplomats that negotiated the Treaty of Tlatelolco which prohibited nuclear weapons in Latin America and the Caribbean.

The family had extensive properties throughout the Yucatán Peninsula. A few of the haciendas owned by members of the Cámara family in the early 20th century include Hacienda San Antonio Cámara, Hacienda Chucmichén, Hacienda Santa Ana, Hacienda Xcalak, Hacienda San Diego Azcorra,Hacienda Itzincab Cámara, Hacienda Polyuc and Hacienda Dzuiché, among many others. They were also the owners of the iconic Cámara Houses in Mérida.

After the Mexican Revolution, Article 27 of the 1917 Constitution had laid the foundation for Agrarian reform in Mexico. In 1937, a socialist government headed by president Lázaro Cárdenas del Río expropriated the Haciendas from the traditional landowning families and transformed them into ejidos, an autonomous collective unit, with communal right to land ownership. Prior to the expropriation, The Association for the Defense of the Henequen Industry, a landowners' organization, "sent five of its affiliates –among them a Molina, a Cásares and a Cámara, the inevitable names" to the Los Pinos Presidential Residence to meet with President Cárdenas, who "listened calmly to their grievances" but refused their request. Many former haciendas stopped being the economic powerhouses they had once been and now lay in ruins.

== See also ==
- List of noble houses
- Count of Vila Franca
- Count of Ribeira Grande
- Portuguese nobility
- Spanish nobility
- Mexican nobility
- Juan Rodríguez de la Cámara
- João Gonçalves da Câmara (Zarco)
- Captains of the Donataries

== Bibliography ==
- Barreto, Maxcahrenas. Portuguese columbus : secret agent of King John II.. London, England: Palgrave Macmillan, 2014. OCLC 935190217 ISBN 978-968-16-5995-0
- Melo, Carlos. História dos Açores: Da descoberta a 1934 . Ponta Delgada: Câmara Municipal de Ponta Delgada, 2008.
- Faria e Maia, Francisco de Athayde M. de.. Capitães dos donatários (1439–1766). Lisboa, Portugal: Núcleo Gráfico da Escola Preparatória de F. Arruda, 1972. OCLC 976699653
- Valdés Acosta, José María. A Través de las Centurias (Vol. I). México DF: Talleres Litográficos de la Impresora Bravo, 1979. OCLC 6626094
- García Bernal, Manuela Cristina. La Sociedad en Yucatán (1700–1750). Sevilla, España: Editorial CSIC, 1972. OCLC 1178651
- González Muñoz, Victoria and Martínez-Ortega, Ana. Cabildos y élites capitulares en Yucatán (1700–1725). Sevilla, España: Escuela de Estudios Hispano-Americanos de Sevilla, 1989. OCLC 782343653
- Ladd, Doris. The Mexican Nobility at Independence (1780–1826) . Austin, Texas: Institute of Latin American Studies, 1976. OCLC 491921643
