= Joana Tomásia da Câmara =

Joana Tomásia da Câmara (1730 - 1782), descendant of the House of Camara, was the second daughter of José da Câmara, heir to the title of the Captaincy of São Miguel and the Countship of Riberia Grande, who was the 4th Countess of Ribeira Grande, without descendants.

She married her uncle, D. Guido Augusto da Câmara e Ataíde, born in Paris on 30 June 1718, who became the 14th and, ultimately, the last donatary-captain of the island of São Miguel and Count of Ribeira Grande. Guido Augusto began his role in 1757, but on 2 August 1766 the title of donatary-captain was extinguished, by decree of King Joseph I of Portugal. The couple never resided in the captaincy, and as a son of a member of the Távora family, the count was jailed for his family's implication in the attempted regicide. The count died in the prison of Junqueira in 1770. Joana discovered that he died in 1777, when the prisoners were liberated.

She had one son, Luís António José Maria da Câmara, who was born in 1754 (and later died in 1802).

Preceded by José da Câmara Teles	Captaincy of São Miguel; 1757–1762	Extinct
Preceded by José da Câmara Teles	Count of Ribeira Grande; 1757-?	Succeeded by Luís António José Maria da Câmara
