= Luís Manuel da Câmara, 3rd Count of Ribeira Grande =

His Lordship The Count of Ribeira Grande

12th Donatary-Captain of São Miguel
- In office 1720–1723
- Monarch: John V
- Preceded by: José Rodrigo da Câmara
- Succeeded by: José da Câmara Teles
- Constituency: São Miguel

Ambassador of Portugal to France
- In office 1715–1721
- Preceded by: Luís da Cunha
- Succeeded by: Marco António de Azevedo Coutinho

Personal details
- Born: 1685 Lisbon
- Died: 1723 (aged 37–38) Lisbon
- Citizenship: Kingdom of Portugal
- Spouse: Leonor Teresa Maria de Ataíde

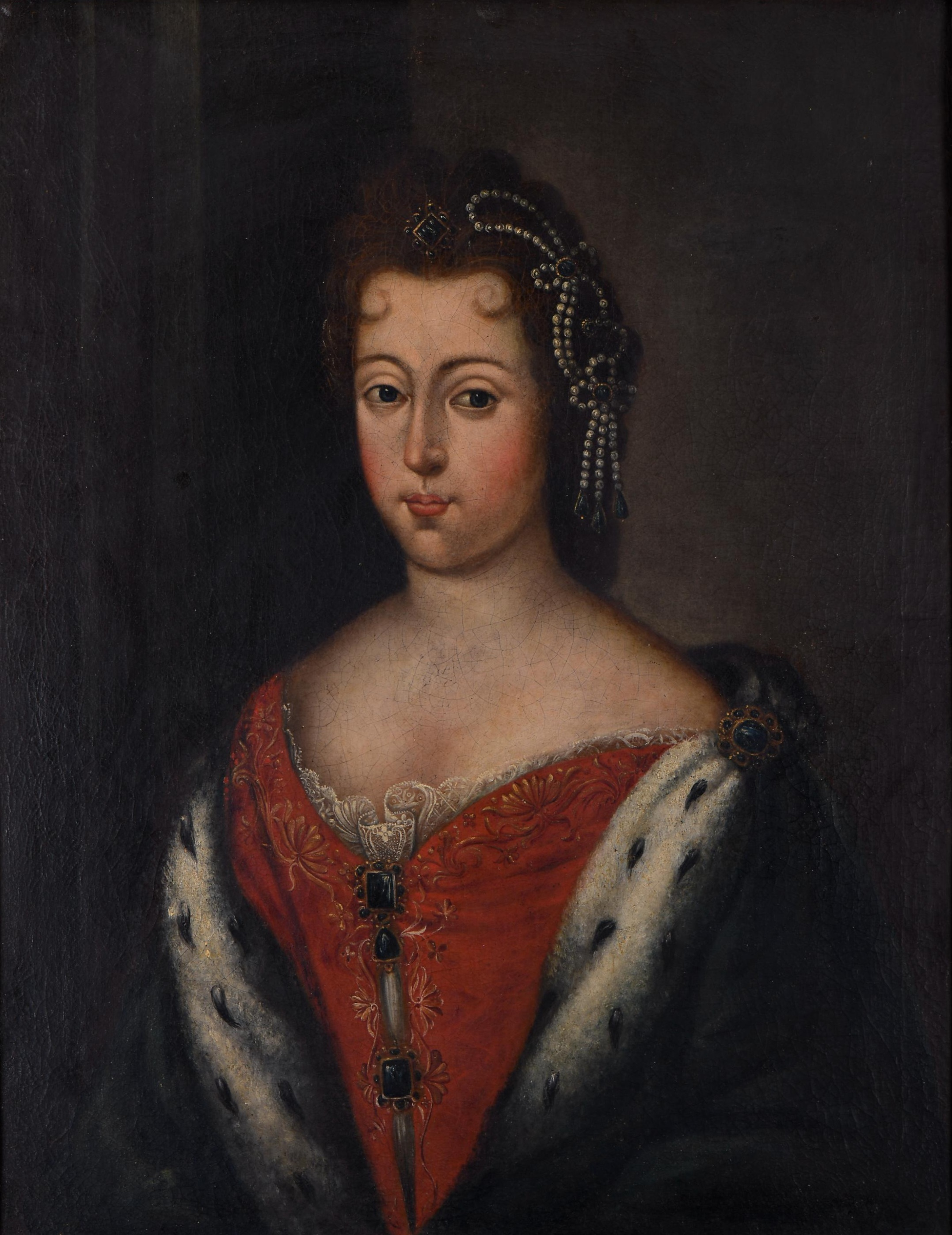
A portrait of his mother, Constance-Émilie de Rohan-Soubise, Princess of Rohan-Soubise

D. Luís Manuel da Câmara (1685;Lisbon-1723), member of the Azorean dynastic House of Camara, he was son of José Rodrigo da Câmara, grandson of François, Prince of Soubise, and 12th Donatary-Captain of the island of São Miguel (though he never took on the post and barely participated in the activities on the island, except for a joint-venture with his father). Remembered for his defense of the fortress of Campo Maior, referenced by the Spanish and King John V of Portugal, he was posted to the court of Louis XIV, following the War of the Spanish Succession.

== Biography ==
=== Early life ===
Born in Lisbon, Luís was educated in the Cortes, groomed for a career in the military.

In 1707 he was imprisoned, after being wounded in Almansa.

On 11 March 1711, married D. Leonor Teresa Maria de Ataíde, daughter of the 9th Count of Atouguia.

=== War of Spanish Succession ===
Eventually released, in 1712, he was made seventh alcalde of the Castle of São Brás, alcalde of Amieira, in the Order of Christ, commander of São Pedro de Torrados (in the same order). He was made an artillery commander in a contingent in the Alentejo, under the command of Pedro Mascarenhas, during the War of Spanish Succession. Finding the square at Campo Maior under attack from the enemy, under the command of French general Alexandre Maître, Marquis de Bay, he petitioned the Count to be given the difficult and honourable task of defending the site. Assisted by forces from Elvas, under the command of French huguenot brigadier João Massé (Jean Destremau, sieur de Massé, who would later be in Brazil), he surprised and entered the encampment. He was unable to do so, until assisted by a considerably larger force, that allowed a nighttime sortie. On 27 October, a larger contingent arrived from Elvas under the command of the Count of Ericeira and General Paulo Caetano de Albuquerque. The General D. Pedro de Zuniga, who commanded the Spanish army, asked for an armistice to recover his dead and wounded, and the Marquess Bay decided to retreat. The heroism of the defenders of Campo Maior had an influence throughout the country and Kingdom, and the King wrote personally to the Count, promoted his officials and sent words of praise to the soldiers.

The King named him one of the plenipotentiaries that participated in the signing of the Treaty of Utrecht in 1713.

=== Portuguese ambassador ===
For his success, Luís Manuel was named ambassador extraordinary to the court of Louis XIV, his credentials accepted on 26 March 1714. He lived in France for seven years in great ostentation, with the high nobility.

He arrived in Paris on 18 August 1715, in triumphal parade, with five magnificent coaches, distributing 10,000 silver coins that he ordered smite (in commemoration of his success), in addition to 200 pieces of gold. His ambassadorial posting was remarkable for the excess richness and luxury, in comparison to other embassies, and his entry into Paris would mark the excess of his posting. His entourage included a confessor, one equerry, two secretaries, eight "hangers-on", six footmen, four pages, two Swiss guards, five coachmen, five postilions and 24 runners. He had embroidered coats, and entered Paris dressed with a jacket laced with a habit of Christ and buttons in diamonds, along with a large hat. Even his pages were dressed in gold velvet robes, with gold, tissue cuffs, and silver embroidery. On their shoulders were gold ribbons, and embroidered silver mesh, their hats decorated in silver with white plumes and white ribbons. The five coaches were pulled by eight large, black Frisian horses each. The first coach symbolised the peace between Portugal and France, and was large, encircled with windows and decorated in dark green velvet entirely covered in gold moulding in relief. The roof formed an airy pavilion that was completed by a dome or crown, forming a large raised rose. The eight doorknobs were of moulded gold. Friezes of delicate sculpture divided the coach: the four parts of the earth, Mercury, Liberal Arts and Amaltheia over a panther. The King, ironically, died fifteen days following his arrival: on 1 September 1715.

=== Later life ===
During his seven years at the Portuguese mission, he attempted to obtain license from the Portuguese government to establish in Brazil a French commercial venture. Instead he developed new installations and factories in Portugal, based on these French techniques, despite the opposition of the French ambassador, Abbey de Mornay.

He returned to Portugal in 1720 due to incidents involving the Dubois ministry, who inhibited the entry of the Portuguese plenipotentiaries assigned by John V of Portugal to the Congress of Cambrai. At that time, the Portuguese monarch bestowed on him the title of third Count of Ribeira Grande, during the lifetime of his father. His return to São Miguel also resulted in a small influx of French specialists to the island, who participated in a wool textile factory that he and his father started. In all, he was able to influence 53 French manufacturers to establish factories on the island.

His return to Portugal was short-lived and in 1723, he died. He never directly obtained the Captaincy of São Miguel, which passed directly to his offspring, the 4th Count of Ribeira Grande, José da Câmara Teles (who was born in 1712).
