= Rui Gonçalves da Câmara II =

- Rui da Câmara

3rd Captain-Donatário of São Miguel
- In office 1504 – 20 October 1535
- Monarchs: Emmanuel I; John III
- Preceded by: João Rodrigues da Câmara
- Succeeded by: Manuel da Câmara
- Constituency: São Miguel

Personal details
- Born: Rui Gonçalves da Câmara; 1490 Vila Franca do Campo
- Died: 20 October 1535 (aged 44–45) Ponta Delgada
- Resting place: Convent of Nossa Senhora da Esperança
- Citizenship: Kingdom of Portugal
- Spouse: Filipa Coutinho

Rui Gonçalves da Câmara (c. 1490 - a 20 October 1535), was the son of João Rodrigues da Câmara and successor to the Donatary-Captaincy of the island of São Miguel in the Portuguese archipelago of the Azores.

== Biography ==
=== Early life ===
Rui Gonçalves studied in Lisbon, at Corte, where his father maintained important connections. During his stay, he was informed of the untimely death of his father: he was eleven years at the time of his death. Owing to his age, the administration of the captaincy of São Miguel was assumed by his uncle Pedro Rodrigues da Câmara until 1504. Meanwhile, in 1503, King D. Manuel I named a Corregedor (magistrate) to the Azores, with legal, tax and inspection powers over local authorities, ostensibly eliminating the absolute authority of the donatary-captains.

=== Donatário ===
Achieving age of majority in 1504 (two years following his father's death), he assumed the captaincy of the island. Shortly after arriving in São Miguel, his mother and siblings were lost at sea during a voyage to Lisbon: the ship was lost.

Rui da Câmara married D. Filipa Coutinho, daughter of the Count of Marialva.

The presence of the magistrates triggered a serious conflict of powers involving the captain, the counter of the royal treasury and the ecclesiastical magistrate, the latter having been arrogated powers that far exceeded tutelage over the clergy (since he was aware of civil matters and exempt from compliance with other authorities). This conflict, and others, came to the attention of the king when he called the captain to Corte, before dispatching him to north Africa. The captain was dismissed resulting in serious financial problems. This situation was resolved five years later, through the efforts of D. Jorge de Melo who, in trade for a promise to marry his daughter to the Captain's first born, he offered some influences at Corte. By royal charter, Rui da Câmara was readmitted as Donatary-Captain to São Miguel on 22 August 1515.

As his financial situation was progressing well enough, on 22 October 1522 a strong earthquake destroyed many of the settlements of the island, and made it susceptible to the Black Death. Vila Franca do Campo, then capital of the island, was buried following a landslide that killed his first-born son and a majority of his family. The Captain survived the event owing to his presence in Lagoa, along with his wife and son (Manuel da Câmara), at his summer residence. Due to its destruction, the capital of São Miguel moved to Ponta Delgada, where the Captain-Donatário eventually began to reside in a residence near the Church of São Pedro. Before arriving in Ponta Delgada, though, Rui and his wife spent some time in Vale de Cabaças (today Caloura) where they befriended the daughters of the nobleman Jorge da Mota, who had taken shelter in the location following the earthquakes. They had begun a small shelter, supported by local donations, and Rui decided to support the sisters, going as far as petitioning the Pope for a bull to establishment a convent (Convent of Santo André in Vila Franca do Campo, moving his family to the location and ordering remodelling of the buildings. Eventually, though, his need in the provincial capital forced Rui and D. Coutinho to move to Ponta Delgada, which may have been the reason why the Convent of Caloura was abandoned in 1540 (and why the Convent of Nossa Senhora da Esperança, in Ponta Delgada, was erected).

Following the death of his first-born, Rui da Câmara made his surviving son marry D. Joana de Melo, daughter of D. Jorge de Melo. This turn of events did not appeal to the youth, who fled aboard a galleon to Madeira, and from there to North Africa. His father ordered his retrieval, but was only successful when the King intervened, ordering his marriage.

During Câmara second term as Captain-Donatário he was responsible for improvements to coastal defenses on the island, owing to the increased activity of pirates within the waters of the Azores. Along with reorganizing the military forces on the island, under his administration Rui da Câmara was responsible for improvements to forts, including the construction of the Fort of São Brás.

=== Later life ===
By the time of his grandson's birth (Rui III), Rui da Câmara had transferred his residence to the road later known as Rua do Conde, which was renamed following the title bestowed on the Câmara family (during the Philippine Union).

The captain, with financial problems and personal heartbreaks, died in Ponta Delgada on 20 October 1535, and was buried in the Convent of Nossa Senhora da Esperança.
