= Count of Vila Franca =

Noble title in the Kingdom of Portugal

The Count of Vila Franca (Portuguese: Conde de Vila Franca) was a title of nobility granted to a hereditary line of nobles from the island of São Miguel in the Portuguese archipelago of the Azores, most closely associated with the Câmara family. The title was first conferred to Rui Gonçalves da Câmara in 1583, and his branch of the Câmara family continued to hold the title until the loss of possessions and privileges suffered by Rodrigo da Câmara at the hands of the Inquisition in 1652.

== History ==
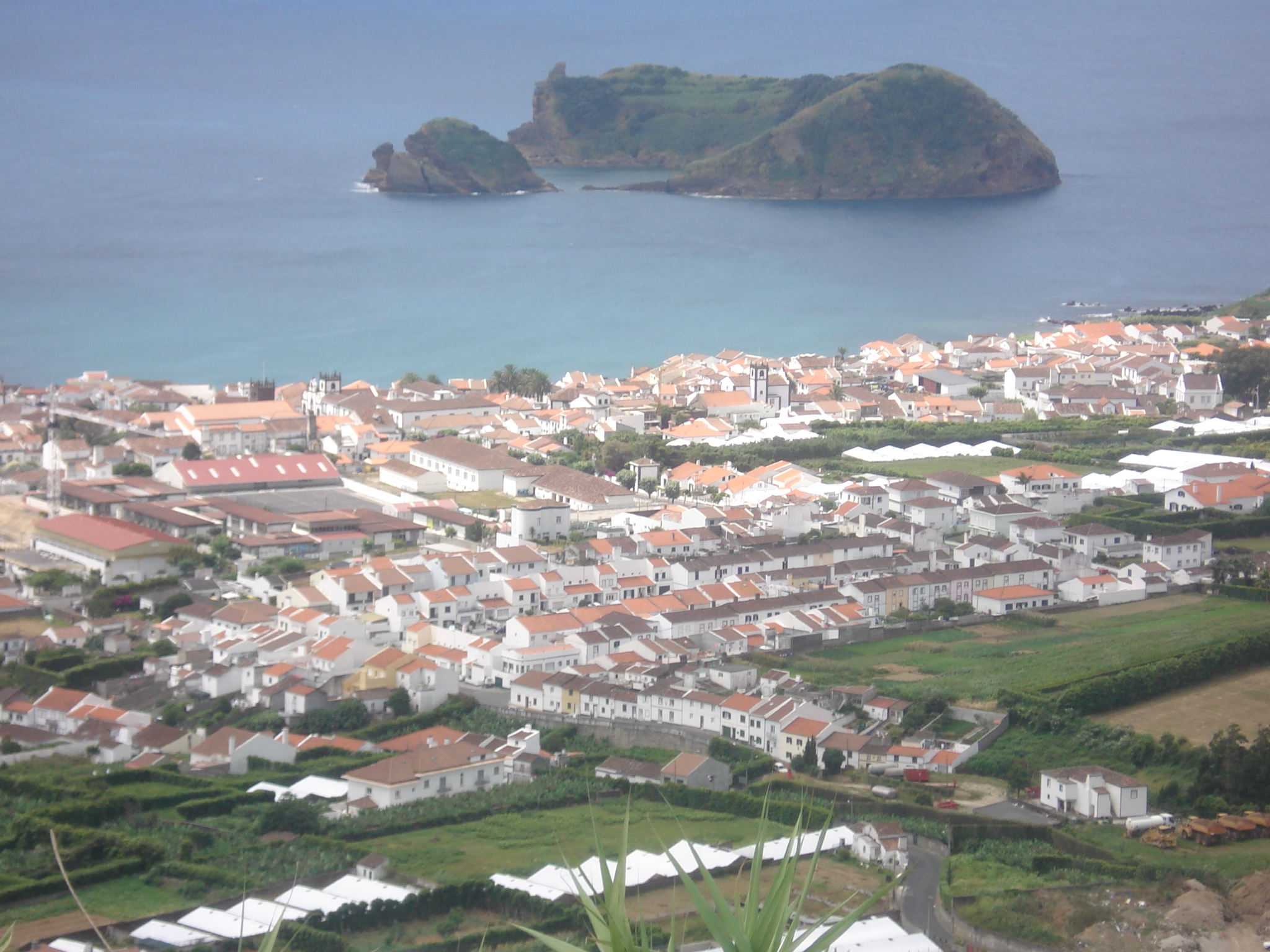
The provincial capital of Vila Franca do Campo until 1522, the seat of the Counts of Vila Franca

In 1573, the captain of São Miguel, Manuel da Câmara passed on the administration of the island to his son Rui Gonçalves da Câmara (the third such Rui in the family), and went to live in Lisbon until his death in 1578, at a time when the reign of the Cardinal King was nearing its end. Following the king's death several pretenders lined-up to assume the monarchy, including Philip II of Spain, António, Prior of Crato and the Infanta Catherine, Duchess of Braganza, among others. But, it was the conflict between António and Philip II that took centre stage: following António's defeat at the Battle of Alcântra, he remained king in only the Azores (barring São Miguel, where the nobles were indifferent to the monarch).

Rui, meanwhile, following his father's death had chosen to remain in Lisbon, and was there when the continent fell to Philip II. He aligned himself, and by association, his family to the Philippine succession. He also supported the King during the Battle of Vila Franco do Campo. In gratitude for his support, King Philip conceded him the title of Count of Vila Franca. At the time, the Countship was the highest honorific title that the King could bestow on a Portuguese citizen, especially one that was not his own son. There were few counts in Portugal, and many of them were wealthy and powerful. The selection of the designation was specifically chosen to privilege the nobles of the island of São Miguel, where the provincial capital had been of Vila Franca do Campo until 1522.

Yet, the municipal authorities at the time did not appreciate that D. Rui was named Count in their name, since that title was conferred by a Spanish King. Philip II undeterred responded that the title was merely honorific, and that the title did not transgress any of the rights and privileges of the "citizens" of the town.

Rui da Câmara eventually arrived in his countship along with a second fleet, ordered to the archipelago to conquer the island of Terceira, which had held out (along with other islands) the acclamation of Philip as King of Portugal. This began a period of unified power in the Azores under the flag of Spain, that would continue until the Restoration of Portuguese independence. In the meantime, the Gonçalves da Câmara line enjoyed privileges in the Azores, under successive Captains-Donataráios and Counts of Vila Franca.

The end occurred in the aftermath of the succession of John IV to the throne. Many of the islands of the Azores acclaimed the truly Portuguese monarch (in 1641), and Rodrigo da Câmara (3rd Count of Vila Franca) eventually accepted his governance following the defeat of the Spanish at the fortress of Terceira and a personal letter from John IV. Rodrigo kept his titles and privileges following the defeat, but, in 1650, the Inquisition investigated and arrested the Count from several complaints raised against him associated with sexual escapades (a scandal at the time). His possessions, privileges and titles were confiscated and his family's position was in crisis: the noble eventually died a miserable death in the Convent of Cape St. Vincent in 1601. Through the influence of his spouse and her familial line, though, the Câmaras regained their prestige, eventually obtaining the new title of Counts of Ribeira Grande.

== List of stewards ==
1. Rui Gonçalves da Câmara, 1st Count of Vila Franca (1578-1601)
2. Manuel da Câmara, 2nd Count of Vila Franca (1601-1619)
3. Rodrigo da Câmara, 3rd Count of Vila Franca (1619-1662)
4. Manuel da Câmara, 4th Count of Vila Franca (1662-1673)

== See also ==
- List of countships in Portugal
