= José da Câmara Teles, 4th Count of Ribeira Grande =

Luís Manuel da Câmara 3rd Count of Ribeira Grande

12th Donatary-Captain of São Miguel
- In office 1720–1723
- Monarch: John V
- Preceded by: José Rodrigo da Câmara
- Succeeded by: José da Câmara Teles
- Constituency: São Miguel

Personal details
- Born: 1712
- Died: 1757 (aged 44–45) Lisbon
- Citizenship: Kingdom of Portugal
- Party: Joana Tomásia da Câmara
- Spouse: Leonor Teresa Maria de Ataíde
- Relations: Guido Augusto da Câmara (brother)

José da Câmara Teles (1712 in Lisbon – 1757 in Lisbon), member of the Azorean dynastic House of Camara, he was son of Luís Manuel da Câmara, third Count of Ribeira Grande and made 13th Donatary-Captain of the island of São Miguel following his father's death (who never received the title directly). An absentee captain, he was forced to return to the island by the King.

== Biography ==
=== Early life ===
He was born in Lisbon in 1712, and educated in Paris, where his father was posted to the Corte of King Louis XIV

He married D. Margarida de Lorena e Távora, daughter of the 2nd Count of Alvor, Bernardo Filipe Nery de Távora and D. Joana de Lorena, in 1728.

They raised two children, a son died young, while their daughter Joana Tomásia da Câmara, would become Countess of Ribeira Grande, who was forced to marry her uncle (Guido Augusto da Câmara, brother of José Rodrigo da Câmara).

=== Donatary-Captain ===
José Teles was master of a grand House, accumulated from the hereditary privileges of his grandfather and all the donatary captains, alcaldes, and commanders of the Order of Christ (including commander of the Port of Mujas and Port of Ervagens on the island of São Miguel). He became, consequently, the 11th Donatary-Captain, and 8th alcalde of the Fort of São Brás since 1724, at the time of his grandfather's death. Yet, he was reluctant to visit his captaincy, until the King, as a requirement of the municipal councils of the Kingdom, by royal proclamation on 8 March 1740, ordered him to São Miguel.

He returned to his ancestral home to find it insolvent, depleted from the expenditures of his father in France. He remained in Ponta Delgada for ten years, dedicating himself to the administration of his grandfather's factories in Ribeira Grande.

=== Later life ===
José da Câmara Teles returned to Corte in 1752, obtaining the post of Colonel in the infantry, but died in 1757 (at the age of 45).
