= Pedro Correia da Cunha =

Portuguese nobleman

1st Captain-Donatário of Santa Cruz
- In office 1475–1485
- Monarchs: Alphonso V; John II
- Preceded by: Vasco Gil Sodré
- Succeeded by: Duarte Correia da Cunha
- Constituency: Santa Cruz

1st Captain-Donatário of Santa Cruz
- In office 1485–1497
- Monarchs: John II; Emmanuel I
- Succeeded by: Duarte Correia da Cunha
- Constituency: Graciosa

Personal details
- Born: Pedro Correia da Cunha; 1440
- Died: 1497 (aged 56–57) Lisbon
- Citizenship: Kingdom of Portugal
- Spouse: Izeu Peresterelo
- Children: Jorge Correia da Cunha; Duarte Correia da Cunha; Branca Correia da Cunha; Filipa Correia da Cunha; Maria Correia da Cunha; Catarina Correia de Lacerda

Pedro Correia da Cunha (1440 – 1497, Lisbon) was a Portuguese nobleman who was the Second Donatary-Captain of Porto Santo, and the 1st Donatary-Captain of the island of Graciosa, in the Portuguese archipelago of the Azores.

== Biography ==
Pedro Correia was a descendant of D. Paio Peres Correia, 17th Grandmaster of the Portuguese Military Order of Saint James of the Sword. he was the son of Gonçalo Correia, master of the ancient House of Farelães, and his wife Branca Rodrigues Botelho. Many of his siblings and close relatives came to live in the Azores, including Margarida Correia, Jácome Dias Correia and João Correia "the Elder".

=== Donatary-Captain ===
Pedro Correia purchased the Donatary-Captaincy of Porto Santo in 1458 for 300,000 reais plus a perpetual yearly interest payment of 30,000 reais. Yet, in 1473 he was forced to return the Captaincy due to a lawsuit brought by his brother-law, Bartolomeu Perestrelo "o Moço", who was under-age at the time that his mother sold the Captaincy.

Pedro Correia da Cunha arrived in Graciosa around 1475, after being nominated to the position of Donatary-Captain of the northern part of the island. At the time Graciosa was divided into two captaincies: the southern part of the island (with its seat in Vila da Praia) was under the governorship of Vasco Gil Sodré; the northern captaincy, seated in Santa Cruz, was offered to Pedro Correia da Cunha. After 1485, his wife and children came to live on Graciosa, when Cunha became the principal Donatary-Captain, when the territory was unified.

=== Later life ===
He died in Lisbon in 1497, and was buried in the Chapel of St. John, erected in the Church of Nossa Senhora do Carmo (of whom he was patron). His wife's remains were later buried in the same chapel, after she died on the island of Graciosa.

== Descendants ==
His wife was Izeu Peresterelo de Mendonça, daughter of Bartolomeu Perestrelo and thus sister to Columbus's wife Filipa Moniz. Izeu Perestrelo was cousin to Ana de Mendonça (the mistress of King John II).

From his marriage to Izeu Perestrelo de Mendonça, his children were:

1. Jorge Correia da Cunha, who married Leonor de Melo, but died before inheriting the Donatary-Captaincy of Graciosa;
2. Duarte Correia da Cunha, who succeeded his father as Donatary-Captain of Graciosa, and married twice;
3. Branca (or Briolanja) Correia da Cunha, who became wife of Diogo Vaz Sodré;
4. Filipa Correia da Cunha, who married Simão da Cunha;
5. Maria Correia da Cunha;
6. Catarina Correia de Lacerda, who married Heitor Mendes de Vasconcelos;
