= Rodrigo da Câmara =

Portuguese noble

Rodrigo da Câmara 3rd Count of Vila Franca

7th Captain-Donatário of São Miguel
- Monarchs: Philip III of Portugal; John IV of Portugal
- Preceded by: Manuel da Câmara II
- Succeeded by: Manuel da Câmara III
- Constituency: São Miguel

Personal details
- Born: Rui Gonçalves da Câmara; 1594
- Died: 1662 (aged 67–68) Ponta Delgada
- Resting place: Ponta Delgada
- Citizenship: Kingdom of Portugal
- Nickname: O Infeliz (The Unhappy)

Rodrigo da Câmara (c.1594 – c.1662), member of the Camara Family, was son of Manuel da Câmara II, and succeeded him as the 7th Donatary Captain of the island of São Miguel, and 3rd Count of Vila Franca.

== Biography ==
=== Early life ===
Destined for a military career by his father, young Rodrigo was sent in 1612 to Ceuta, where he remained in military service for two years. He returned to Portugal and married D. Maria de Faro, daughter of the Count of Vimioso and niece of D. Francisco de Faro, the niece of Philip II of Spain (Philip I of Portugal). He was 25 years old when his father died, the point at which he succeeded the man as the Captain-Donatário of the island of São Miguel.

=== Donatário ===
He frequented the Spanish Court in Madrid, accompanied the royal family in diverse trips throughout Spain, and lived a comfortable life. Among other servants he had a personal secretary, valets, butlers, pages, squires and footmen, all working for him in his duties.

By royal decree, in 1624, he was obliged to take his retinue to Ponta Delgada and carry out his role as dontary captain, but following the death of his wife returned to court in 1626. He remarried on June 1, 1628, to D. Maria Coutinho, daughter of the Count of Vidigueira, the Queen's handmaiden and descendant of Vasco da Gama: at the wedding, the couple were assisted by the King of Spain and the entire court. The King, therefore, continued to bestow on him and his descendants the title of Count of Vila Franca, an act that formalized these privileges in perpetuity, as the original titles given to his father and grandfather were only until the end of their lives.

Remaining in Lisbon in the ancestral home in the estate of São Francisco, in 1629 he and his wife had a daughter, followed in 1630 by a son, which they named Manuel Luís. Following his birth, Rodrigo moved once again to Ponta Delgada, leaving behind his family while he settled into the new accommodations. He coordinated the assistance and reconstruction following the great volcanic eruption in Furnas in September 1630, which caused the death of 195 people. A Plinian eruption, the explosion caused the liberation of gas, pumice and ash that reached as far as Corvo.

At that time rumours began to appear that the Count was bisexual, this after being caught in flagranti delicto with a nun in the cell of the local convent. Yet, the rumours persisted and stories spread of his homosexual dalliances with his pages and footmen. Denounced by the Cortes in Madrid, he departed for the city, where at great cost he was exonerated. Still, owing to the scandal he remained there for some time, until he was ordered to return to São Miguel in 1639, by regal authority. Yet, on his arrival the scandalous commentaries continued, with rumours of sodomy and dalliances with nuns.

The Count was in São Miguel at the time of the beginning of the Portuguese Restoration War, receiving the notice of the acclamation of John IV of Portugal in the middle of January 1641 from Francisco de Ornelas. In a dubious position, he only accepted the new King when John was secure in his position, and even so, only after the Fortress of São João Baptista had fallen. Then, following a royal letter on 6 April 1641, that was personally written to him, he accepted and ordered the acclamation of the new King. Assured that he would be received at Corte, he parted for Lisbon in August 1642. On his arrival he lived at Corte, and was given the task of provisioner for the Santa Casa da Misericórdia of Lisbon in 1644.

In 1646 he commanded a company of men in the Alentejo, during the Restoration War.

=== Later life ===
During this time rumours of his homosexuality continued, creating scandals that only his privileges allowed him to deny. In 1648 he returned to Ponta Delgada where he established his home in a privileged place. In his entourage were various pages, between 13 and 24, who slept in an adjacent bedroom, allegedly monitoring his sleep. Following illness from a hemiplegia, he returned to Lisbon in 1650. In the next year, on 4 May 1651, the inevitable occurred: Lucas Leite Pereira, a former page, presented a new complaint to the Inquisition, that due to the public scandal, they were obliged to initiate a judicial process against the Count.

Receiving a complaint of sodomy on 5 May 1651, two days later the General-Council of the Holy Office of the Portuguese Inquisition deliberated on the material, owing to the Counts position of power. Owing to the grave accusations, the Council ordered that arrest of the accused, not without informing the King. The King, informed of this material by the General Inquisition, and knowing of the rumours, charged the Count of Cantanhede, cousin of the accused, to advise him and counselled him to abandon the kingdom.

The Count ordered the preparation of a ship, but, unafraid of the gravity of the situation did not embark, owing to his illness, but sent a petition to the Holy Office and revealing his location. This would not have been an issue, if it were the first accusation made against the Count, but a record of scandal had followed the nobleman since 1620, and his petition of dismissal was rejected. Since his petition was refused, the Count's departure was rushed for the evening of the 26 May, to France. Yet, owing to tardiness in his preparation, he was arrested at his home on 25 May and sent the Holy Office. The King tried to intervene, requesting his transfer to the royal towers, but the Inquisition refused, citing that he had violated his pages and laws.

The accusation on 5 May included five other complaints, that remained secret in the archives of the Holy Office. A trial was meticulously organized, and the testimonies of the complainants confirmed the Count's homosexual practices. Among those debriefed were several pages, that admitted to a sexual relationship with the Count, describing in detail their practices, and his own son, who admitted an incestuous relationship. The count confessed, confirming all the cases, adding several other new cases; the records, a copy of which was saved in the Azorean Regional Archive, noted that the count had maintained sexual relationships with nuns in various convents of Ponta Delgada, Vila Franca do Campo and Ribeira Grande. The process was explicit for the epoch, and included excerpts of the practices of homosexuals and bisexuals in the 17th century.

Owing to the proof and his own confession, the count was condemned for sodomy on 20 December 1652, and sentenced to life, resulting in the forfeiture of his possessions, including the Captaincy of the island of São Miguel. His wife and his influential family attempted to commute the sentence to life in a convent, rather than the dungeons of the inquisition. In the end Rodrigo was sent to the Convent of Cabo de São Vicente in 1658, where he remained until, in bad health he died on 30 April 1662.
