= Manuel da Câmara III =

Portuguese politician

Manuel da Câmara 1st Count of Ribeira Grande
- Manuel Luís Baltazar da Câmara

8th Captain-Donatário of São Miguel
- In office 1662–1673
- Monarch: John IV of Portugal
- Preceded by: Rodrigo da Câmara
- Succeeded by: José Rodrigo da Câmara
- Constituency: São Miguel

Personal details
- Born: Manuel Baltasar Luís da Câmara; 5 January 1630
- Died: December 29, 1673 (aged 43) Lisbon
- Citizenship: Kingdom of Portugal

Manuel Luís Baltazar da Câmara (5 January 1630 – 29 December 1673, in Lisbon), member of the Gonçalves da Câmara, was the son of Rodrigo da Câmara and succeeded him as the 8th Donatary Captain of the island of São Miguel, 4th Count of Vila Franca and first Count of Ribeira Grande.

== Biography ==
=== Early life ===
Manuel was the son of Rodrigo da Câmara and D. Maria Coutinho, dame in the court of Queen Elizabeth of Bourbon.

He was 21 years old when he testified against his father in front of the Holy Office of the Inquisition, for alleged practices of sodomy and supposed incestuous relations. These crimes, at the time, resulted in the forfeiture of family possessions and loss of honour at Corte: his father eventually died in miserable conditions in the convent of Cape St. Vicent. The remainder of the family, consequently, suffered a period of financial chaos and became social outcasts in court. Manuel Luís married late, and remained with his mother at the convent where his father was incarcerated, until his father's death.

=== Donatário ===
Following the death of the 3rd Count of Vila Franca, the Countess used her family's connections (the Counts of Vidigueira were descendants of Vasco da Gama) with the royal family to attempt to recover the possessions confiscated following the scandal of her ex-husband, and rehabilitate the family honour. She, therefore, sought King Afonso VI to resuscitate the Captaincy and the incomes associated with this patronage. By royal letter, dated 15 September 1662, the monarch named D. Manuel Luís Baltazar da Câmara, the first Count of Ribeira Grande, returned his familial interests and provided an inheritance for him and his descendants. Shortly later, on 28 September, the King re-instituted all the possessions confiscated from his father, including the Captaincy of São Miguel.

=== Later life ===
Manuel served in the Restoration Wars in the province of Alentejo, as master-of-camp in Setubal.

The 1st Count of Ribeira Grande did not narrowly support the development of São Miguel, and was instrumental in the support of the Catholic church, donating funds to the Império dos Nobres on Faial, in order to fulfill a promise made to the Holy Spirit. In this intervention he promised to institutionalize the Cult of the Holy Spirit if God would provide him with a strong son: his son, José, would later inherit the Captaincy of São Miguel.

He was believed to have gone mad before dying.
