= Antão Martins Homem =

2nd Captain-Donatário of Praia
- In office 1483–1520
- Monarchs: John II; Manuel I
- Preceded by: Álvaro Martins Homem
- Succeeded by: Álvaro Martins Homem III
- Constituency: Praia

Personal details
- Born: Antão Martins Homem; 1450s
- Died: 1531
- Citizenship: Kingdom of Portugal
- Spouse: Isabel de Ornelas da Câmara
- Children: Álvaro Martins Homem; Domingos Martins Homem da Câmara; Catarina da Câmara Homem; Pedro Álvares da Câmara

Antão Martins Homem (1450s–1531) was a Portuguese nobleman, 2nd Donatary-Captain of Praia. He succeeded his father Álvaro Martins, in the captaincy of the Terceira Island.

== Biography ==
Antão was the son of Álvaro Martins Homem, the 1st Donatary-Captain of Vila da Praia and Inês Martins Cardoso, along with siblings Catarina Cardoso, Fernão Martins Ferreira and Luís Martins Homem. The family of Antão Martins Homem was descended from Pedro Homem da Costa one of the fabled The Twelve of England.

He eventually married Isabel de Ornelas da Câmara (daughter of Pedro Álvares da Câmara, the son of João Gonçalves Zarco and Catarina de Orneslas Saavedra), fathering several children, including Álvaro Martins Homem; Domingos Martins Homem da Câmara; Catarina da Câmara Homem and Pedro Álvares da Câmara (who became canon of the Sé Cathedral of Angra. His son, Álvaro Martins Homem III, became the third Donatary-Captain of Praia, and married Beatriz de Noronha.

=== Donatary-Captain ===
His installation as the Donatary-Captain of Praia was confirmed in the town of Moura, on 26 March 1483.

Antão Martins processed many of the residents of Praia for constructing mills, and not paying him for that service. Finally, the ouvidor Vasco Afonso decided (as acting captain in 1487), that Antão Martins should construct four mills, and repair the ones in Agualva. This, thereby, allowing the citizenry to mill at their convenience, without tribute to the King or donatary-captain. But, since this was not accomplished the residents returned to the ouvidor, this time Afonso de Matos, who ordered their construction in three months in 1491. This after João Gomes, João Correia and Afonso Anes, in addition to other property-owners and gentlemen farmers of that captaincy constructed their own mills. But, even then, the Donatary-Captain did not comply, and it was resolved that the residents could mill in their places for six months (May to October), when there was less water. The monopoly on salt was also waived, which permitted the purchase of salt from ships.
