= Rui Gonçalves da Câmara III =

Portuguese politician

Rui Gonçalves da Câmara 1st Count of Vila Franca

5th Captain-Donatário of São Miguel
- In office 1573–1601
- Monarchs: Sebastian; Henry; Philip I
- Preceded by: Manuel da Câmara
- Succeeded by: Manuel da Câmara II
- Constituency: São Miguel

Personal details
- Born: Rui Gonçalves da Câmara; 1550
- Died: 1601 (aged 30–31)
- Citizenship: Kingdom of Portugal

Rui Gonçalves da Câmara (c.1550 – c.1601), member of the House of Camara, was son of Manuel da Câmara, and succeeded him as the 4th Donatary Captain of the island of São Miguel, but was recognized predominantly in his role as the 1st Count of Vila Franca during the Philippine dynasty.

== Biography ==
Following the death of his father in 1578, who was buried in almost monarchical fashion, the new Captain-Donatário departed for Lisbon, where he hoped to join King Sebastian of Portugal on his adventure into North Africa. But, upon arriving the Corte received notice of the disaster at Alcácer Quibir, occurring on 4 August 1578, and the disappearance of their King.

=== Donatário ===
The events of his disappearance threw Portugal into a dynastic crisis, and the young noble decided to remain at Corte. Yet, he received orders by King Henry to part for his captaincy, in order to maintain political stability within the Kingdom: he departed in September 1579. But, a few leagues into the Atlantic, he resolved to return to Lisbon, alleging health problems with his wife and obtained royal permission to postpone his voyage until the following April.

King Henry's death on 31 January 1580 permitted Rui to postpone his return to the Azores, indefinitely. During the dynastic crisis that developed, Rui Gonçalves da Câmara aligned his family with the faction supporting Philip II of Spain (Philip I of Portugal), while on the island of Terceira and other islands of the Azores, António, Prior of Crato was enthusiastically acclaimed. Yet, on São Miguel, where his family influenced politics, there was tepid support for António, with many of the nobles supporting the Castilian pretendent to the throne. With his arrival in the Azores (in 1582), King António temporarily altered this situation. But, quickly, the defeat of Luso-French forces, commanded by Filippo Strozzi on 26 June 1582 (at the Battle of Vila Franca), put São Miguel definitively in the hands of the faction supporting Phillip II. By royal decree, the donatary captain, Rui Gonçalves da Câmara, departed with a squadron of Castilian forces ordered to proceed to occupy the Azores, launching on 23 June 1583. This was not before, by regal charter (dated 17 June 1583) he was named Count of Vila Franca, owing to his collaboration and support for the Philippine cause.

Following five years of absence, on 7 June 1583, Rui disembarked in Vila Franca do Campo, and was received in full honours. But, his Spanish connections and recent elevation to Count did not make him popular with the local populous: the municipal council in Vila Franca imposed embargoes after the granting of the title, alleging that it violated its historical privileges. The embargoes were rejected, but demonstrated the people's resistance to the new regime. Resuming his functions, Rui installed himself in Ponta Delgada, dedicating himself to the defence of the island. This was important, since his allegiance to Phillip II made him an indirect enemy of France and England: the island was, therefore, threatened with increased attacks from English and French forces, including Francis Drake. The Count distributed his forces throughout the island, creating a company of "adventurers" (aventureiros as they were locally known) under the command of his son Gaspar. Meanwhile, the Count of Cumberland attacked and sacked Graciosa and São Jorge, while his compatriot, the Duke of Essex, did this same on the island of Faial. Regardless, the Castilians were reviled by the local populous, favouring their supporters rather than the local nobility of the time.

=== Later life ===
On 12 August 1590 he departed for Lisbon, leaving behind his ouvidor Gonçalo Vaz Coutinho to handle his supervisory duties. During Coutinho's stewardship, the island was attacked by 150 troops loyal to Count of Essex, who launched various attacks and caused a lot of damage. But, his efforts were for not, and he returned to England along with the potential English governor (whom Elizabeth had dispatched anticipating an easy conquest of the islands). On 1598, Rui Câmara returned to the islands, where he continued to exercise his functions until his death in 1601.
