= Álvaro Martins Homem III =

Portuguese politician

Álvaro Martins Homem da Câmara
- 3rd Captain-Donatário of Praia
- Predecessor: Antão Martins Homem
- Successor: Antão Martins da Câmara
- Born: c.1490 Praia, Azores
- Died: c.1535 Praia, Azores
- Noble family: Martins Homem
- Spouse: Beatriz de Noronha
- Occupation: Politician

Alvaro Martins Homem (c.1490-1535) was a Portuguese nobleman and the 3rd Donatary-Captain of Praia da Vitória.

== Biography ==
Álvaro was born in Praia da Vitória, Portugal, son of Antão Martins Homem and Isabel de Ornelas da Câmara, a noble lady, great-great-granddaughter of Sancho de Herrera de Saavedra, and descendant of João Peres de Vasconcelos. He was married to Beatriz de Noronha, daughter of João de Noronha and Inês de Abreu, a noblewoman, belonging to the family of João Fernandes de Andrade and Beatriz Gomes de Abreu.

The marriage between Martins Homen and Beatriz de Noronha, was performed in 1519 in the Ribeira Palace, due to the illustrious ancestry of the Noronha family, among whose ancestors was Alfonso Enríquez, Count of Gijón and Noreña, son of Henry II of Castile.

Álvaro Martins Homem was designated Captain-Donatário of Praia by order of John III of Portugal, he held the position from 1520 to 1535, being replaced by his brother, Antão Martins da Câmara. Both brothers were the grandsons of Álvaro Martins, 1st Captain of Praia.
