= Manuel da Câmara II =

Portuguese politician

Manuel da Câmara II 2nd Count of Vila Franca
- Manuel Luís Baltazar da Câmara

6th Captain-Donatário of São Miguel
- In office 1601–1617
- Monarchs: Philip I of Portugal; Philip II of Portugal
- Preceded by: Rui Gonçalves da Câmara III
- Succeeded by: Rodrigo da Câmara
- Constituency: São Miguel

Personal details
- Born: Rui Gonçalves da Câmara; 1570
- Died: 1617 (aged 46–47) Ponta Delgada
- Resting place: Ponta Delgada
- Citizenship: Kingdom of Portugal

Manuel Luís Baltazar da Câmara (c. 1570 – April 1617), member of the dynastic Gonçalves da Câmara family, was son of Rui Gonçalves da Câmara III, and succeeded him as the 6th Donatary Captain of the island of São Miguel.

== Biography ==
=== Donatário ===
Following the death of his father, by royal decree (25 October 1601), he was made 2nd Count of Vila Franca, assuming at that time the captaincy of the island.

He was married to D. Leonor de Vilhena, daughter of D. Fradique Henriques, King Philip's chief steward.

The new captain lived a great part of his life in the captaincy, and was recognized for the stability and security of his government, something that was lacking in his father and grandfather's administration.

The most prominent occurrence of his regime occurred in 1616, when the neighbouring island of Santa Maria was attacked by Barbary coast pirates, Vila do Porto completely sacked and its inhabitants sold into slavery in Northern Africa. This episode gave origin to the Confraria dos Escravos da Cadeinha (the brotherhood of the slaves of Cadeinha). D. Manuel attempted to alleviate the concern of Marienses, even as little was accomplished by the national administration to relieve their suffering.

Câmara's administration was characterized by a reorganization of the territory and by slow progress in the administration of civil and eccelisastical courts. This was a period of integration of church and state, when many of the public works were associated with the Baroque period starting with first religious projects, such as the Misericórdia and the Franciscan Convent of Ribeira Grande, and in Ponta Delgada, the Jesuit College, Convent of São João and Convent of Graça. In Terceira, following the 1614 earthquake, which caused the death of 200 people and destruction of 1600 homes and 24 churches, there were also several initiatives to recuperate and reestablish normalcy.

=== Later life ===
In April 1617, Manuel II died, and was succeeded by his son in the position of, ultimately, last Count of Vila Franca.
