= Vasco Gil Sodré =

Vasco Gil Sodré (c. 1450 – c. 1500) was a Portuguese navigator and one of the first settlers of the island of Graciosa. Although he attempted to obtain the Donatary captaincy of the island, he and his progenitors were the origin of many of the families of the island. English and Portuguese records about the English origins of the Sodré's and their ties to Earl of Hereford, House of Wessex, House of Normandy, Norman-Plantagenet ancestry, House of Lancaster, the Butler dynasty, the Belknaps of Kent, and the House of Beaufort are generally disputed most hostilely by the English for legal and political reasons: ex, estates, writs of attainder, real or perceived shifts in allegiances, rivalries, inheritances.

== Early life ==
Born in Montemor-o-Novo, the son of Gil Sodré and grandson of the English nobleman John de Sudley (transliterated to João de Sodré, where Sodré was corrupted from the English Sudeley or Sudley. John Sudley was a descendant of William le Boteler, which explains the commonality of his coat-of-arms in England and Portugal, between the Boteler (Butler) and Sodré families.

== Marriage ==
Vasco Gil Sodré was married twice: first to Iria Vaz do Couto, daughter of Duarte Barreto do Couto, the first Donatary captain of Graciosa; and the second to Beatriz Gonçalves da Silva, who accompanied him to the island. He had one daughter named Isabel (Sodre).

Beatriz Gonçalves da Silva was referred to, by Gaspar Frutuoso, as Beatriz Gonçalves de Bectaforte, native of the castle of Bectaforte in England. From this marriage, he had Diogo Vaz Sodré, Fernão Vaz Sodré, Mécia Vaz, Leonor Vaz and Inês Vaz, as well as others, comprising ten children, that were the progenitors of the island of Graciosa.

Duarte Barreto do Couto, brother of his first wife, was married to Antónia Sodré, making them double in-laws. Although there are few record, Duarte Barreto do Couto, more commonly known as Duarte Barreto, noble of the Algarve, was Donatary captain of the southern part of the island, which was later incorporated into the territory of the captaincy of Graciosa.

== Graciosa ==
Vasco Gil Sodré came to Graciosa following the mysterious disappearance of Duarte Barreto do Couto, who died during a Castilian incursion into Graciosa (probably in 1475, during the War of the Castilian Succession). Becoming a widow, and alone on the island, Antónia Sodré wrote to her brother, so that he could come to stay with her.

Responding to her invitation, Vasco Gil Sodré came to Graciosa, after a stopping at several north African settlements, arriving at a time in which Portugal was at war with the Crown of Castile, owing to the pretensions Joanna la Beltraneja, between 1475 and 1479.

Gil Sodré was accompanied by Beatriz Gonçalves da Silva, and a group of servants, arriving in Graciosa after staying in Terceira. The family erected a house in Carapacho, a place near to their lands in the southwest of the island, in what is today Praia.

Vasco Gil Sodré attempted to obtain the Donatary captaincy of the island, including the construction of a customs-house on his part, the captaincy of the north (centered on Santa Cruz da Graciosa) was given to Pedro Correia da Cunha (brother-in-law of Christopher Columbus, who arrived on the island from Porto Santo, after losing the captaincy, in 1474.

Despite the efforts of the Sodré family, in 1485 Pedro Correia da Cunha was confirmed as Donatary Captain for the entire island, because the "land was too small for two divisions", effectively impeding Vasco Gil Sodré and his descendants from obtaining the captaincy they claimed. This decision definitively unified the captaincy of Graciosa, until the Donatary system was abolished. The division resulted in the two municipalities on the island (Praia da Graciosa and Santa Cruz da Graciosa), later unified in 186]. Vasco died at Santa Cruz da Graciosa.

== Historical and political context of disputes over records ==
Early Mercian and Capetian associations, Earl of Hereford:

Early estates that developed into later Sudeley holdings were located outside Winchcombe, then a capital of Mercia, and prospered during the reign of King Offa of Mercia.

The early manor of Sudeley is traditionally described as a gift from Æthelred the Unready to his daughter Goda upon her marriage to Drogo of Mantes, whose son was Ralph, Earl of Hereford. Drogo of Mantes belonged to the Capetian House of Vexin, also known as the First House of Vexin or the House of Valois-Amiens-Vexin.

Norman Conquest and continuity of Sudeley Castle:

Ralph, Earl of Hereford, nicknamed “the Timid” following a military defeat during the Norman Conquest, was succeeded by his son Harold de Ewyas, also known as Harold de Sudeley. Harold married Godiva of Wessex and was related by kinship to Edward the Confessor.

Despite the upheavals of the Conquest, the Sudeley estates were retained under William the Conqueror. Harold’s son, John de Sudeley, married Grace de Tracy, daughter of William de Tracy--an illegitimate son of Henry I of England. John de Sudeley is credited with constructing the first Sudeley Castle.

The Anarchy and King Stephen:

During The Anarchy, John de Sudeley supported Empress Matilda. In retaliation, King Stephen seized Sudeley Castle and used it as a royal stronghold.

Assassination of Thomas Becket, Archbishop of Canterbury:

William de Tracy, identified as a member of the Sudeley family, was among the assassins of Thomas Becket, Archbishop of Canterbury, in 1170, an act traditionally understood as occurring at the perceived behest of Henry II of England. The event is frequently cited as an early illustration of tensions between the English monarchy and the Catholic Church.

Knights Templar associations:

The Sudeleys were prominent benefactors of the Knights Templar during their period as early feudal barons in England. Ralph de Sudeley was known as a great-grandson of Henry I contemporaneously. Following the suppression of the Templars in England in 1312, members of the order were welcomed by King Dinis of Portugal and reorganized as the Order of Christ.

The dissolution of the Knights Templar has been cited as a potential cause for the loss or destruction of records relating to the children of the Sudeley family, with the possibility that undocumented cadet or collateral branches existed, including in Ireland.

Maternal lines to foreign dynasties and fear of French influence:

The Sudeleys formed part of an interconnected network of Marcher lord families, including the Mortimers and Despensers, who frequently intermarried with the Staffords and Beauchamps to consolidate power in western England.

Maternal ties to continental dynasties, including the House of Courtenay, were potentially viewed with suspicion by English ruling elites, particularly given the Sudeleys’ landholdings, military capacity, and historical associations with the Knights Templar. Figures cited in this context include John de Sudeley, 2nd Lord Sudeley, and his wife Eleanor de Scales.

The Scales family were prominent Templars and Lords Scales, with maternal descent from the Capetian House of Courtenay through Egeline de Courtenay, mother of Eleanor de Scales. Members of the family served under Edward I during the suppression of Scotland. The Scales were also ancestors of Lord Rivers, father of Elizabeth Woodville, later queen consort to Edward IV.

Bartholomew Sudeley, son of John de Sudeley and Eleanor de Scales, married Matilda Montfort of the House of Montfort-Brittany, a cadet branch of the House of Dreux. Through the Montfort line, Matilda was related to Simon de Montfort, 6th Earl of Leicester, leader of the Second Barons' War (1264–1267), whose reforms contributed to the development of parliamentary representation. These connections, alongside Courtenay and Scales ancestry, have been interpreted as reinforcing concerns over potential French influence.

The Sudeleys may also have been related to Robert the Bruce through Richard de Clare, 2nd Earl of Pembroke.

Peasants’ Revolt of 1381 and Belknap inheritance inquisitions:

Robert Belknap, Chief Justice of the Common Pleas, was given the unenviable task by Richard II of enforcing the poll tax that preceded the Peasants' Revolt of 1381. The unpopular Belknap was later attainted and banished to Ireland, though the writ was later revoked.

Belknap family estates became the subject of inquisitions post mortem when John Belknap, son of Sir Hamon Belknap and grandson of Robert Belknap, was declared dead in 1436 by a council acting on behalf of Henry VI. At that time, Belknap was legally deceased in English records while the family stood to inherit Sudeley Castle.

Portuguese sources identify John Belknap as João de Resende Sodré, father of Isabel Sodré, mother of Vasco da Gama. Belknap was also the maternal grandson of Thomas le Boteler, 4th Lord Sudeley, linking the family to the Butler dynasty. Da Gama’s journals name Frederick Sudley as a maternal grandfather who traveled to Portugal in 1381 with Edmund of Langley, 1st Duke of York.

Treaty of Windsor and Portuguese settlement of Azores:

The alliance between England and Portugal, formalized by the Treaty of Windsor (1386), is regarded as the oldest continuous alliance in the world. Philippa of Lancaster, daughter of John of Gaunt, traveled to Portugal with a retinue that included John de Sudley, also known as John Sodre, according to Portuguese histories and accounts of the Azores.

Her son, Henry the Navigator, favored Gonzalo Vaz Botelho, whose family later intermarried with the Sodré family and held offices in the Azores. Vasco Gil Sodré was known in Portugal as the grandson of John de Sudley and nephew of William le Boteler of Wem, with coats of arms having political weight and serving as a basis for office-holding.

Wars of the Roses and House of Beaufort:

Richard Plantagenet, 3rd Duke of York, also known as "Richard of York", was directly at odds with Edmund Beaufort, 2nd Duke of Somerset. Beatriz de Goncalves de Bectaforte may have been a daughter, granddaughter, or great-grand daughter of John "of Gaunt," Plantagenet either by Katherine Swynford, an unknown mistress, or John or Edmund Beaufort, the Dukes of Somerset.

During the Wars of the Roses, Edward IV seized Sudeley Castle from Ralph Boteler, Baron Sudeley, an advisor to Henry VI, reflecting the Sudeleys’ Lancastrian alignment. Richard III later claimed that Lady Eleanor Talbot had a pre-contract of marriage with Edward IV, rendering the children of Edward IV and Elizabeth Woodville illegitimate under canon law. Eleanor Talbot had previously been married to Sir Thomas Butler, son of Ralph Boteler. This means that, legally speaking, Eleanor Talbot was Queen consort to Edward IV due to the allegation by Richard III that is still extant.

Richard III seized Sudeley Castle and used it as a base prior to his defeat by Henry VII at the Battle of Bosworth Field. Henry VII’s claim to the throne relied primarily on victory rather than direct paternal legitimacy, and due to his maternal descent from Margaret Beaufort.

Sudeley Castle used as Yorkist stronghold:

Sudeley Castle, historically, has been a hotly contested castle among royals and a central piece of any discussion about civil wars. Sudeley Castle was seized from the Lancastrian Boteler family (Baron Sudeley) by Edward IV and given to Elizabeth Woodville's father, Earl of Rivers, and then her brother, Anthony, Earl Rivers who was a key Yorkist ally.

Reign of Henry VII, Tudor consolidation, English Civil War, Glorious Revolution of 1688:

Sudeley Castle later became the residence of Thomas Seymour, 1st Baron Seymour of Sudeley (Lord Sudeley was a title seized by Richard III and given to Seymour by the Tudors in recognition of his ancestry from the Sudeleys), who attempted to install Lady Jane Grey as queen. The castle is also the burial place of Catherine Parr, sixth wife of Henry VIII.

During the English Civil War, Sudeley Castle served as headquarters for Prince Rupert of the Rhine, nephew of Charles I. One of the estate’s cottages is named after him.

The Catholic House of Stuart had Beaufort lineage from Joan Beaufort, Queen of Scots. The House of Stuart was rejected as monarchs of England and replaced by William III (of Orange-Nassau) and Mary II, later replaced by the House of Hanover and the House of Saxe-Coburg and Gotha, aka, "Windsor." This can be problematic to current royal houses, such as the House of Windsor that the current pretender to the Portuguese throne, Duarte Pio, Duke of Braganza could also claim the crown of England through the House of Beaufort.

Act of Settlement:

The Act of Settlement 1701 barred Catholics from the English line of succession, legally excluding the Catholic House of Stuart and securing the Protestant succession that followed.
