= Manuel da Câmara =

Portuguese politician

4th Captain-Donatário of São Miguel
- In office 20 October 1535 – 1573
- Monarchs: John III; Sebastian; Henry
- Preceded by: Rui Gonçalves da Câmara II
- Succeeded by: Rui Gonçalves da Câmara III
- Constituency: São Miguel

Personal details
- Born: Manuel da Câmara; 1504
- Died: 1578 (aged 73–74) Lisbon
- Resting place: Ponta Delgada (Azores)
- Citizenship: Kingdom of Portugal

Manuel da Câmara (c. 1504 - 13 March 1578, Lisbon), was the son of Rui Gonçalves da Câmara II and successor to the Donatary-Captaincy of the island of São Miguel in the Portuguese archipelago of the Azores.

== Biography ==
=== Early life ===
Younger son of Rui Gonçalves da Câmara II and D. Filipa Coutinho, following the death of his older brother, the adult would fall in line to replace his father in succession to the familial fiefdom of São Miguel in the Azores. Further, the obligation to succeed his brother's duties also included his marriage to D. Joana de Melo, daughter of Jorge de Melo (head gamekeeper to the King), who assisted his father in the captaincy government. This turn of events did not ingratiate Manuel, who hopped onto a galleon sailing to Lisbon, but stopping-off in Madeira he obtained a voyage to the North of Africa. His father eventually ordered his return, but it was the intervention of the King who forced the adult to Corte, where he was obliged to marry the gamekeeper's daughter.

=== Donatário ===
Upon receiving notice of his father's death, he departed for São Miguel in 1535, living his wife at Corte. He remained on the island until 1540, before returning to Lisbon.

At the end of that year, he was ordered by the King to the fortress in Santa Cruz do Cabo de Gué, which was encircled by Moors, by the time of his arrival in December. He distinguished himself in combat, but was eventually imprisoned. Following two years of captivity, he paid his own ransom, and eventually returned to Lisbon, where he was compensated with his Captaincy privileges. Yet, he remained at Corte until 1552, the year when French pirates and corsairs threatened many of the Câmara holdings: his familial ties insisted on his presence. By order of the King, he sailed for São Miguel where he remained until 1554, fortifying the defences, including the Fort of São Brás in Ponta Delgada.

=== Later life ===
Following volcanic eruptions in 1563, he returned to the islands in 1565 and remained until 1573, when he returned to Portugal, leaving his son, Rui, as the Captain-General in his place. Manuel da Câmara died in Lisbon on 13 March 1578; his body was laid to rest in Ponta Delgada, where he received a funeral befitting a member of the monarchy.
