= Count of Ribeira Grande =

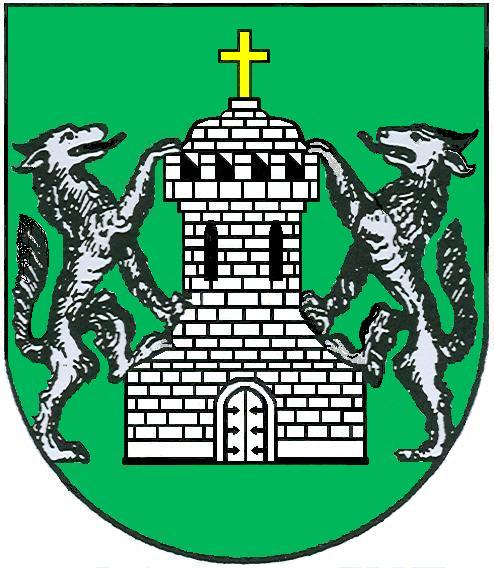
- Creation date: 15 September 1662
- Created by: Afonso VI of Portugal
- Peerage: Kingdom of Portugal
- First holder: Dom Manuel Luís Baltasar da Câmara, 4th Count of Vila Franca
- Last holder: Dom Vicente de Paula Gonçalves Zarco da Câmara (monarchy abolished)
- Present holder: José Cabral Gonçalves Zarco da Câmara (claimant)
- Remainder to: Hereditary in perpetuity (de juro e herdade)
- Subsidiary titles: Marquis of Ribeira Grande (1855–1872)
- Extinction date: 1910 (monarchy abolished)
- Motto: Pela Fé, pelo Príncipe, pela Pátria

The Count of Ribeira Grande (in Portuguese: Conde da Ribeira Grande) was a hereditary Portuguese title of nobility (de juro e herdade), created by King Afonso VI by letters patent of 15 September 1662 to replace the title of Count of Vila Franca. It was held by the family of the captains-donatary of São Miguel Island, in the Azores, the Gonçalves Zarco da Câmara, who descended in the male line from João Gonçalves Zarco, the discoverer of Madeira.

The title was first granted to Dom Manuel Luís Baltazar da Câmara, until then 4th Count of Vila Franca and 8th captain-donatary of São Miguel.

== History ==
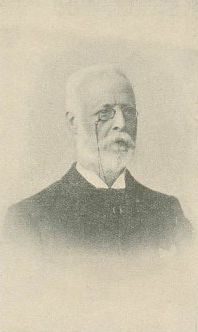
José Maria Gonçalves Zarco da Câmara, 9th Count of Ribeira Grande (1843–1907)

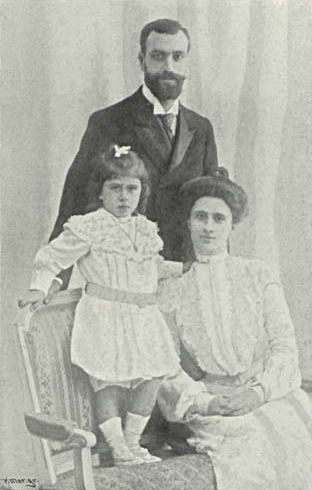
Vicente de Paula Gonçalves Zarco da Câmara, 10th Count of Ribeira Grande, with his wife and son (1908)

=== Background ===
The Câmara family acquired the lordship of São Miguel in 1474, buying the captaincy from João Soares de Albergaria. On 17 June 1583 the heads of the family received the title of Count of Vila Franca, also hereditary in perpetuity. João Gonçalves Zarco, the founder of the line, had been granted a coat of arms by Afonso V on 4 July 1460, and the grant included the surname "Câmara de Lobos", from which the family took its name.

=== Creation of the title ===
Although Manuel Luís Baltazar da Câmara was made Count of Ribeira Grande by letters patent of 15 September 1662, the origins of the title lie in the downfall of his father, Rodrigo da Câmara, 3rd Count of Vila Franca, of whose second marriage Manuel Luís was born. The 8th captain-donatary was involved in several scandals during his career and was eventually arrested and tried by the Holy Office. On the basis of various denunciations, witness statements and his own confession, he was convicted; the family's property was confiscated and he was imprisoned in the Convent of Cape St Vincent until his death.

His wife was unable to secure his release, but through her family connections as a descendant of Vasco da Gama she persuaded the Court to restore the family's honours and property after his death. Their son was the direct beneficiary of this rehabilitation. Because of the discredit attached to the countship of Vila Franca, the island's former capital, the king decided to replace it with that of Ribeira Grande, and Afonso VI also returned to him the Crown and Order property his father had lost. The change, made by charter (alvará) of 15 September 1662, was intended to dissociate the title from the name linked to the conviction of the 3rd Count of Vila Franca. The choice of Vila Franca had been controversial from the start, as Philip II of Spain had not consulted the local authorities before creating the dignity.

As well as being donatary, the 1st Count of Ribeira Grande was governor, captain-general and ouvidor-geral (chief magistrate) of São Miguel, alcaide-mor of São Brás Castle and lord of Ponta Delgada, Ribeira Grande, Vila Franca, Nordeste and Água de Pau, among other places.

=== Marquisate ===
In 1855 the 8th Count received the title of Marquis of Ribeira Grande, also hereditary, by decree of 5 September that year, signed by Ferdinand II as regent during the minority of Peter V. The grant arose from the verification of the second life of the title of Marquis of Ponta Delgada, which had been granted for two lives to his aunt, Dona Leonor da Câmara, daughter of the 6th Count; its name was then changed to Ribeira Grande. In the same year, by decree of 28 February, the countship was renewed for the marquis's son and heir, the future 9th Count. Although hereditary, the marquisate was never renewed, so the 8th Count was its only holder.

== Arms ==
The Counts of Ribeira Grande bore the undifferenced arms of the Câmara family, inherited from the Counts of Vila Franca: Vert, a tower argent on a mount, with a cupola and cross Or, between two wolves proper leaning against the tower. The motto was Pela Fé, pelo Príncipe, pela Pátria ("For the Faith, for the Prince, for the Fatherland").

== Counts of Ribeira Grande (1662) ==
No.	Holder	Dates	Title	Notes	Refs
1	Dom Manuel Luís Baltazar da Câmara	1630–1673	1st Count of Ribeira Grande	Also 4th Count of Vila Franca and 8th captain-donatary of São Miguel. A son of the second marriage of the 3rd Count of Vila Franca, he was born on 5 January 1630 and died in Lisbon on 29 December 1673. He was captain-general and governor of São Miguel, mestre de campo of the Setúbal regiment and a gentleman of the household of John IV, and fought in the Alentejo during the Restoration War. He married Dona Mécia de Mendonça, daughter of Diogo Lopes de Mendonça, 2nd Count of Miranda.	
2	Dom José Rodrigo da Câmara	1665–1724	2nd Count of Ribeira Grande	Son of the 1st Count; born on 5 May 1665, he died on 7 March 1724. He was 9th donatary and captain-general of São Miguel, ouvidor-geral, 6th alcaide-mor of São Brás Castle, gentleman of the chamber to Infante Francisco, governor of the Belém Tower, a deputy of the Junta dos Três Estados and president of the Senate of the Lisbon Municipal Chamber. In 1684, in France, he married Princess Constance Émilie de Rohan (1667–1709), daughter of François de Rohan, Prince of Soubise, and Anne Chabot de Rohan. Their children included Dom Duarte António da Câmara (d. 1779), their second son, who on 13 June 1720 married Dona Inês Joaquina da Silva Telo de Meneses, 5th Countess of Aveiras, and was granted the title of Count of Aveiras by letters patent of 26 June that year, later becoming, by his second marriage, 7th Count of Atalaia (1746) and 2nd Marquis of Tancos (letters patent of 19 September 1761); and Dona Ana Xavier de Rohan, wife of the 5th Count of Ericeira.	
3	Dom Luís Manuel da Câmara	1685–1723	3rd Count of Ribeira Grande	Eldest son of the 2nd Count, born on 18 January 1685; he died on 3 October 1723, before his father. Donatary and captain-general of São Miguel and 7th alcaide-mor of São Brás Castle, he distinguished himself in the War of the Spanish Succession: he was wounded at Almansa and, in 1712, as governor of Campo Maior, led the defence of the town during the Spanish siege, which was eventually lifted. He was then ambassador extraordinary to France and plenipotentiary at the Congress of Cambrai, spending some seven years at the French court. On 18 August 1715 he made a lavish public entry into Paris, and he encouraged French craftsmen to settle in São Miguel to develop its woollen industry. In 1711 he married Dona Leonor Teresa Maria de Ataíde (d. 1752), daughter of Jerónimo de Ataíde, 9th Count of Atouguia.	
4	Dom José da Câmara	1712–1757	4th Count of Ribeira Grande	Son of the 3rd Count; born on 23 May 1712, he died on 24 June 1757. As his father had already died, he succeeded his grandfather directly to the whole estate, including the donataries and commanderies. He was 11th donatary and ouvidor-geral of São Miguel and 8th alcaide-mor of São Brás Castle. A captain of dragoons, he was appointed governor of São Miguel in 1742, serving for ten years, and returned to court as a colonel of infantry. On 20 July 1728 he married Dona Margarida de Lorena e Távora, daughter of the 2nd Counts of Alvor.	
5	Dom Guido Augusto da Câmara e Ataíde	1718–1770	5th Count of Ribeira Grande	Son of the 3rd Count; born in Paris on 30 June 1718. He became count through his marriage, on 23 May 1748, to his niece, Dona Joana Tomásia da Câmara (b. 1731), heiress of the 4th Count and 5th Countess of Ribeira Grande. He was arrested on suspicion of involvement in the attempt on the life of King Joseph I and died in the Junqueira prison in 1770.	
6	Dom Luís António José Maria da Câmara	1754–1802	6th Count of Ribeira Grande	Son of the 5th Count and the 5th Countess; born in the parish of Ajuda on 10 February 1754, he died in that of Alcântara on 26 March 1802. Alcaide-mor of São Brás Castle in Ponta Delgada, member of the Council and Knight of the Order of Christ. He served in the cavalry, reaching the rank of captain in 1789, and succeeded his mother as head of the house. He married three times: in 1772 Dona Maria Rita da Cunha (1745–1777), daughter of the 5th Counts of São Vicente, without issue; on 21 November 1778 Dona Maria Rita de Almeida (1751–1786), daughter of the 2nd Marquises of Alorna and sister of the poet Dona Leonor de Almeida, 4th Marquise of Alorna; and in 1788 Dona Francisca Teles da Silva (1766–1796), daughter of the 2nd Marquises of Penalva. The children of his second marriage were the 7th Count and Dona Leonor da Câmara (1781–1850), lady-in-waiting to Queens Carlota Joaquina and Maria II, who in 1835 was granted the title of Marquise of Ponta Delgada for two lives, the second to pass to her nephew, the 8th Count. The children of his third marriage included Dom Manuel Maria da Câmara (1789–1825), colonel of cavalry and Viceroy of Portuguese India, and Dom Luís Maria da Câmara (b. 1793), minister resident in Brussels.	
7	Dom José Maria António Gonçalves Zarco da Câmara	1784–1820	7th Count of Ribeira Grande	Son of the 6th Count and Dona Maria Rita de Almeida; born in the parish of Alcântara on 2 December 1784, he succeeded his father on 26 March 1802. He was 11th alcaide-mor of São Brás Castle, moço fidalgo, veador to Princess Maria Benedita, Grand Cross of the Order of Our Lady of the Conception of Vila Viçosa and Commander of the Order of Aviz. He made his career in the infantry, reaching lieutenant-colonel in 1813, fought in the Peninsular War and later transferred to the army staff in Brazil. He married twice: first, on 18 October 1810, Dona Maria do Santíssimo Sacramento de Vasconcelos e Sousa (1790–1813), daughter of the 2nd Marquises of Castelo Melhor, without issue; and second, on 29 October 1814, Dona Mariana de Almeida Portugal (1785–1849), lady-in-waiting to Queen Maria I and daughter of the 3rd Marquises of Lavradio. The children of the second marriage were the 8th Count and Dona Maria Rita (b. 1820), who in 1842 married the 10th Count of Arcos. He died in Rio de Janeiro in 1820.	
8	Dom Francisco de Sales Gonçalves Zarco da Câmara	1819–1872	8th Count of Ribeira Grande	Son of the 7th Count; born in Rio de Janeiro on 29 July 1819, he succeeded his father as a small child and died in Lisbon, in the parish of Alcântara, on 1 October 1872. Peer of the Realm, alferes-mor (standard-bearer) of the Realm, 12th alcaide-mor of São Brás Castle in Ponta Delgada and Commander of the Order of Aviz. He had a brief military career in the Commerce Volunteers Battalion (1840–1841). He was made the only Marquis of Ribeira Grande, hereditary in perpetuity, by decree of 5 September 1855, signed by Ferdinand II as regent, through the verification of the second life of the title of Marquise of Ponta Delgada granted to his aunt, Dona Leonor da Câmara; he is therefore also counted as 2nd Marquis of Ponta Delgada. He married three times: in Paris in 1840, Dona Ana da Piedade de Bragança Melo e Ligne (1822–1856), daughter of the 3rd Duke of Lafões; in 1857, her sister, Dona Maria da Assunção de Bragança Melo e Ligne (1831–1858); and in 1867, Dona Luísa da Madre de Deus da Cunha e Meneses (1843–1923). His children included the 9th Count; Dona Ana Maria, who married the 1st Marquis of Sesimbra; the playwright and poet Dom João da Câmara (1852–1908); and Dom António de Jesus Maria Zarco da Câmara (1854–1914), a composer of sacred music. His second marriage produced Dona Mariana Zarco da Câmara (b. 1858), who married Manuel de Castro e Lemos, of the Casa do Côvo.	
9	Dom José Maria Gonçalves Zarco da Câmara	1843–1907	9th Count of Ribeira Grande	Son of the 8th Count and 1st Marquis and his first wife; born in the parish of Alcântara on 3 November 1843, he died in 1907 (on 15 February according to Canedo; on 15 December according to Zúquete). A doctor of political and administrative sciences from the University of Louvain, he was attaché at the Portuguese legation to the Holy See, honorary officer-major of the Royal Household, chief steward (mordomo-mor) to Queen Amélie and a Peer of the Realm; he received several Portuguese and foreign honours, including the Grand Cross of the Order of Our Lady of the Conception of Vila Viçosa and the rank of Grand Officer of the Legion of Honour. He took his seat in the Chamber of Peers, by succession to his father, on 7 January 1873. He married twice: first in London in 1862, Dona Luísa Maria de Sousa Holstein (1845–1864), daughter of the 2nd Dukes of Palmela; and second in 1872, in the chapel of the Casa do Côvo (Oliveira de Azeméis), Dona Maria Helena de Castro e Lemos Magalhães e Meneses (1852–1922). The children of the second marriage included the 10th Count and Dom Rui Zarco da Câmara (1888–1952), a well-known mounted bullfighter, who married a granddaughter of the 1st Count of Burnay.	
10	Dom Vicente de Paula Gonçalves Zarco da Câmara	1875–1946	10th Count of Ribeira Grande	Son of the 9th Count and his second wife; born in the parish of Alcântara on 19 July 1875. A law graduate, he was a Peer of the Realm and veador (lord-in-waiting) to Queen Amélie. He married twice: first, in the parish of Mercês on 19 July 1898, Dona Maria da Pureza de Vasconcelos e Sousa (1877–1922), legitimated daughter of the 5th Marquis of Castelo Melhor; and second, on 12 April 1946, the Frenchwoman Yvonne Blanche Bazin, without issue. He died on 24 April 1946.	

== Claimants under the Republic ==
Following the establishment of the Republic in 1910, the state stopped granting titles of nobility. Since then, the following members of the family have claimed to represent the title:

No.	Name	Dates	Title claimed	Notes	Refs
11	José Maria Gonçalves Zarco da Câmara	1898–1961	11th Count of Ribeira Grande	Son of the 10th Count; born in the parish of Santos-o-Velho on 9 December 1898. On 30 May 1925, in Porto, he married Maria Ester Nunes de Almeida de Magalhães (b. 1900). They had three daughters and a son.	
12	José Vicente de Paula Gonçalves Zarco da Câmara	1932–?	12th Count of Ribeira Grande (and Marquis of Ribeira Grande)	Eldest son of the preceding; born in Santarém on 13 December 1932.	
13	José Cabral Gonçalves Zarco da Câmara	b. 1960	13th Count of Ribeira Grande	Son of the preceding.	
