= Hacienda Chucmichén =

- Private Residence
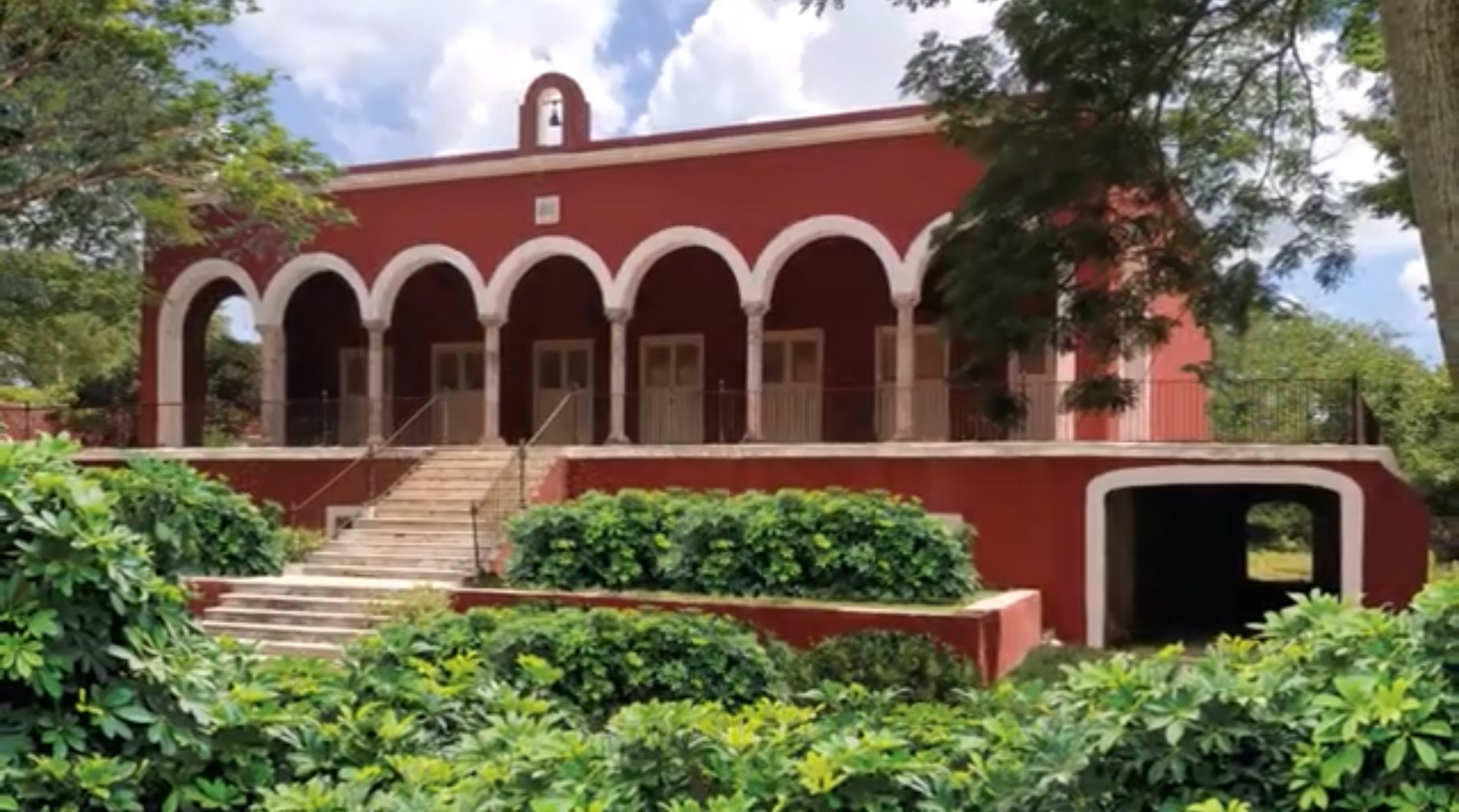
- Hacienda Chucmichén

- Location in Mexico
- Coordinates: 21°13′46″N 88°55′22″W
- Country: Mexico
- Mexican States: Yucatán
- Municipalities: Temax Municipality
- Time zone: UTC−6 (CST)
  - Summer (DST): UTC−5 (CDT)
- Postal code: 92479
- Area code: 991

Hacienda Chumichén was an estate built in the mid-19th century for the aristocratic de la Cámara family. It is located in Temax, Yucatán in the southeast of Mexico.

From its origins as a cattle ranch built for Nicolás de la Cámara y Castillo, it transitioned into a flourishing henequen plantation under the stewardship of Raymundo Cámara Luján, a prominent industrialist. During Yucatán's Gilded Age, which lasted roughly between 1870 and 1920, henequen comprised almost twenty percent of Mexico's total exports, producing 90% of the sacks and rope consumed internationally. By 1900, the United States, alone, was importing some 81 million kilograms of Yucatecan henequen per annum. This generated substantial wealth for a select few families, forming an oligarchy known as the gente decente (the decent people). During this period, the entire Chucmichén estate covered 4,289 hectares dedicated exclusively to henequen. However, the Mexican Revolution and subsequent agrarian reforms led to the decline of the haciendas, including Hacienda Chucmichén, which eventually became ejidos, communal units with collective land ownership.

In the early 21st century, the hacienda was restored and converted into a luxurious residential complex.

== History ==
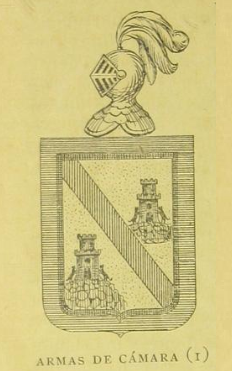
Coat of Arms of the de la Cámara Family

The Hacienda de Chucmichén dates back to c. 1850 and was built for Nicolás de la Cámara y Castillo (1823–1866), originally as a cattle ranch.

The de la Cámara family are descendants of Juan de la Cámara, a conquistador who, alongside Francisco de Montejo, fought in the Spanish conquest of Yucatán in the 16th century. Juan de la Cámara received, among others, the encomienda of Euán and Sinanché, "as the conqueror of these provinces."

Thus, since the beginning of the colonial period, the Cámara family already owned lands in Sinanché, which, like Temax, was then part of the district of Izamal, an area that would become the henequen region of Yucatán in the mid-19th century.

The haciendas in Yucatán were agricultural organizations that emerged in the late 17th century and throughout the 18th century, unlike what happened in the rest of Mexico and almost all of Spanish America, where these estates were established almost immediately after the conquest. In Yucatán, due to geographical, ecological, and economic reasons, particularly the quality of the soil and the lack of water for irrigation, they had a late appearance.

Nicolás de la Cámara y Castillo owned several haciendas in the Temax region, including the Haciendas of Santa Ana, Xkalak, San Antonio Cámara, and Chumichén. When Nicolás died in 1866, the Hacienda de Santa Ana became the property of his youngest son, Nicolás Cámara Luján (1851–1918). The other haciendas came to be owned by Raymundo Cámara Luján (1850–1919), his eldest son.

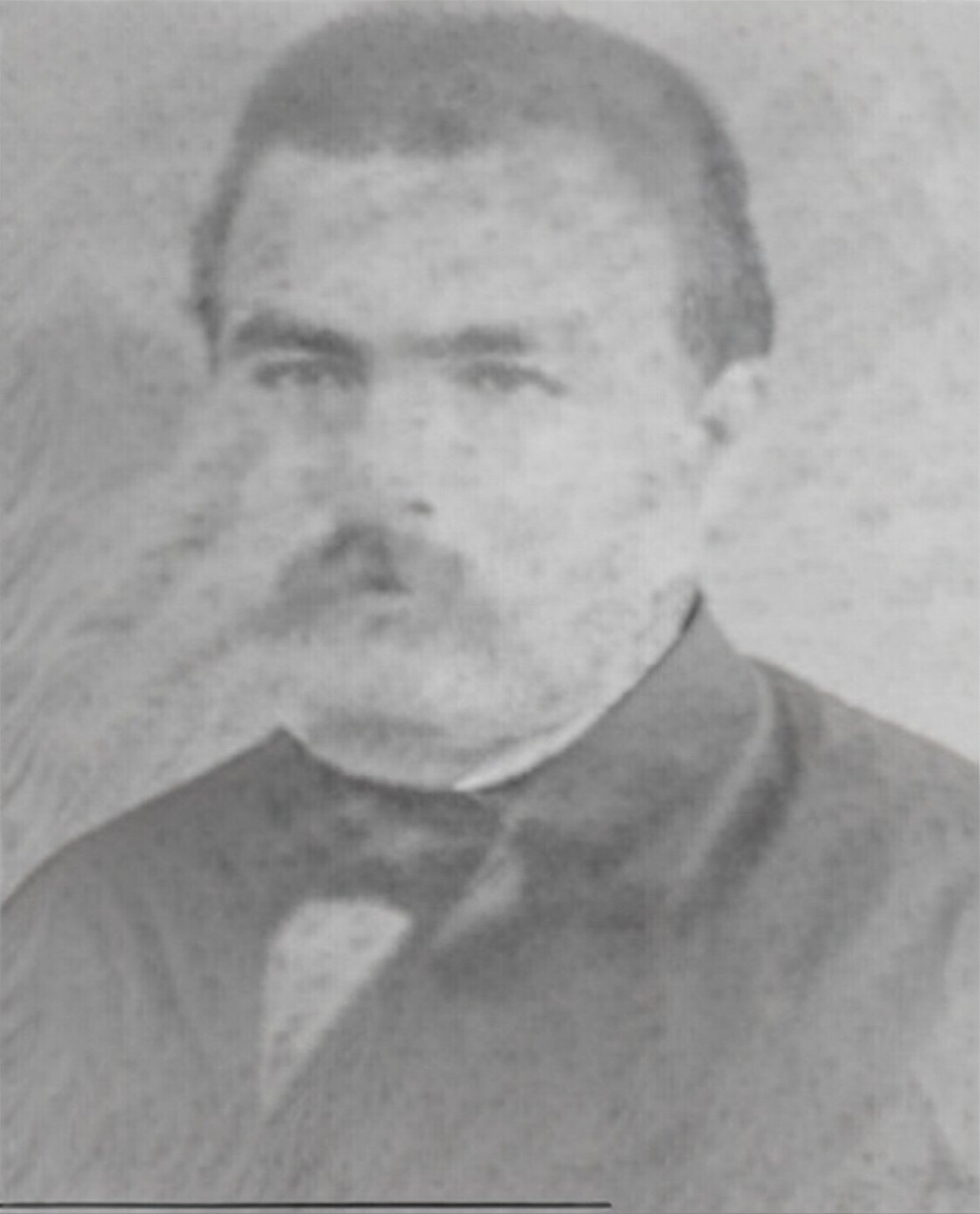
Raymundo Cámara Luján (1850–1919)

Raymundo Cámara Luján became an important industrialist during the Porfiriato and was the father-in-law of José María Pino Suárez, who would become the Vice President of Mexico between 1911 and his assassination in 1913. During the 1880s, he oversaw the transformation of Chucmichén from a cattle ranch into a prosperous henequen plantation.

Just between Chucmichén and San Antonio Cámara, he controlled a combined area of 7,812 hectares (78.12 km^{2}) dedicated to henequen production, roughly the size of Guernsey.

He owned many other estates throughout the Yucatán Peninsula and was both a henequen producer and exporter. In addition to henequen, in his other estates he also produced sugar cane, chewing gum, tobacco, cocoa, cotton, bananas, vanilla, and exploited forest resources.

After the Caste War, henequen haciendas were established on a larger scale throughout Yucatán, particularly in the central-northern region, whose lands were suitable for henequen cultivation. During Yucatán's Gilded Age, which lasted roughly between 1870 and 1920, henequen comprised almost twenty percent of Mexico's total exports, producing 90% of the sacks and rope consumed internationally. By 1900, the United States, alone, was importing some 81 million kilograms of Yucatecan henequen per annum. Much of this wealth was concentrated in a small group of families, knowns as gente decente (the decent people), all of European descent (criollos), oftentimes with close ties of kinship to each other:

"There were about 1,000 henequen haciendas in Yucatan, of which 850 had shredding and packing plants, in the hands of approximately 400 families. But a group of 20 or 30, which concentrated ownership of the land, was capable of extracting 50% of henequen, of controlling nearly 90% of its exportation, of directing, of course, regional politics; in other words, they formed an oligarchy. Among its most prominent members were Eusebio Escalante Castillo, Eusebio Escalante Bates, Carlos Peón Machado, Pedro Peón Contreras, Leandro León Ayala, Raymundo Cámara Luján, José María Ponce Solís, Enrique Muñoz Arístegui, Olegario Molina Solís and Avelino Montes."

After Raymundo Cámara Luján died in 1919, his estates passed on to his children, the Cámara Vales brothers. Among them were María, who had served as the Second Lady of Mexico; similarly, Nicolás and Alfredo had served as Governors of Yucatán and Quintana Roo, respectively.

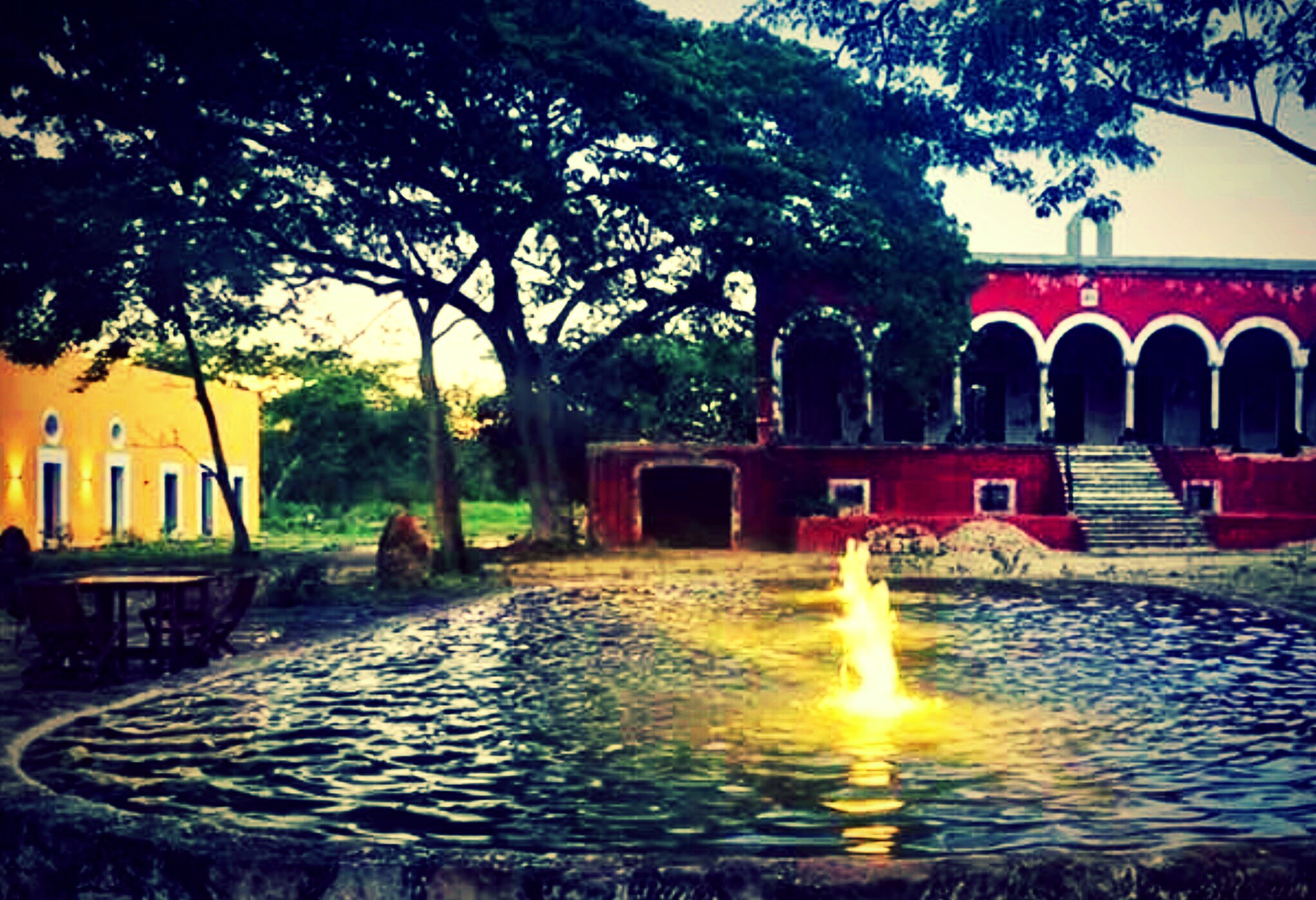
Hacienda Chucmichén

In the 1920s, when the hacienda was still owned by the Cámara Vales brothers, three statues from the Maya civilization were found on its grounds:

"Very present in the oral tradition of Temax and Chucmichén, as the place is known for three sculptures that were sent by train to Mérida in the 1920s. These sculptures were displayed in the archaeological garden on the site that occupied the colonial cemetery of the chapel of the Ermita de Santa Isabel in the city of Mérida. They were cataloged as originating from Chucmichén and are currently safeguarded in the warehouses of the Regional Museum of Archaeology Palacio Cantón. In the town of Temax, our informants remember this sculpture as 'The King,' and it is a rough anthropomorphic representation carved in the round. The figure is facing forward and standing, wearing sandals tied to the legs and a loincloth. It bears a skull-like pectoral, and the arms, without hands or forearms from the elbows, project in high relief towards the front. The head is small and round with a highly stylized face, and on top rests a horizontal headdress with three pieces in low relief, similar to a hat."

Like most other haciendas in Mexico, they ceased to exist and became ejidos, which means they became autonomous collective units with communal land ownership rights, starting in 1937 after the decrees that established agrarian reform in Yucatán, promulgated by President Lázaro Cárdenas del Río. Out of a land area of 4,289 hectares, some 2,389 hectares were expropriated by the government, leaving the Cámara Vales brothers with only about 2,000 hectares around the old hacienda's main building.

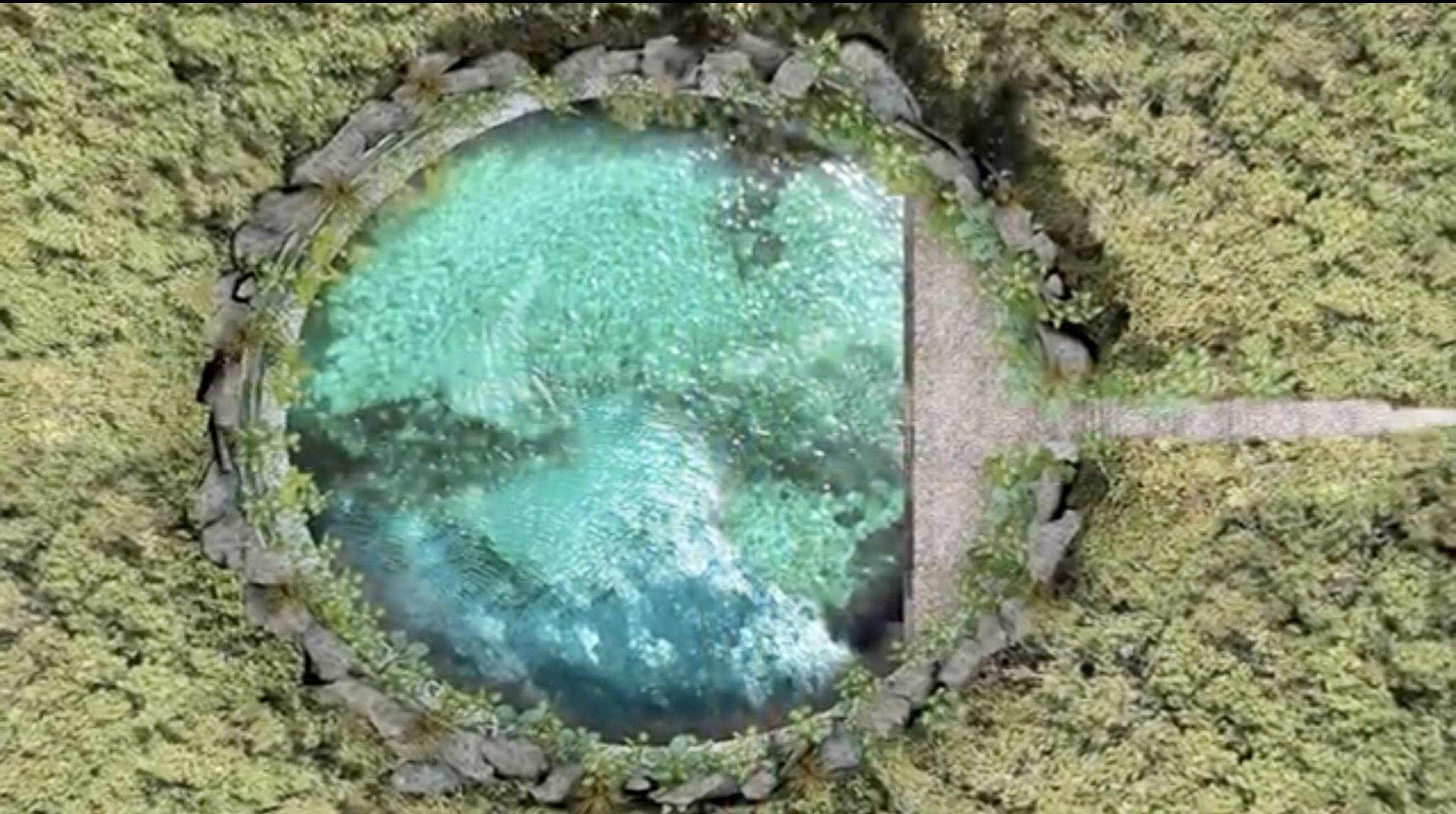
A private Cenote on the grounds of the Chucmichén estate

The hacienda of Chucmichén employed some 280 people in 1910. After the expropriation, regional economic activity declined significantly. As of 2005, the population of Chuchmichén had decreased to 56 people working in the ejidos, effectively reducing the settlement to a hamlet.

As of the 2020s, the former hacienda and the adjacent property have been developed into a luxurious residential complex that includes a beach house, swimming pools, clubhouse, chapel, commercial and service area, and a green area of 125,000 square meters with a kayak lake, cenote, bicycle path, and walking and jogging trail.

== Image Gallery ==
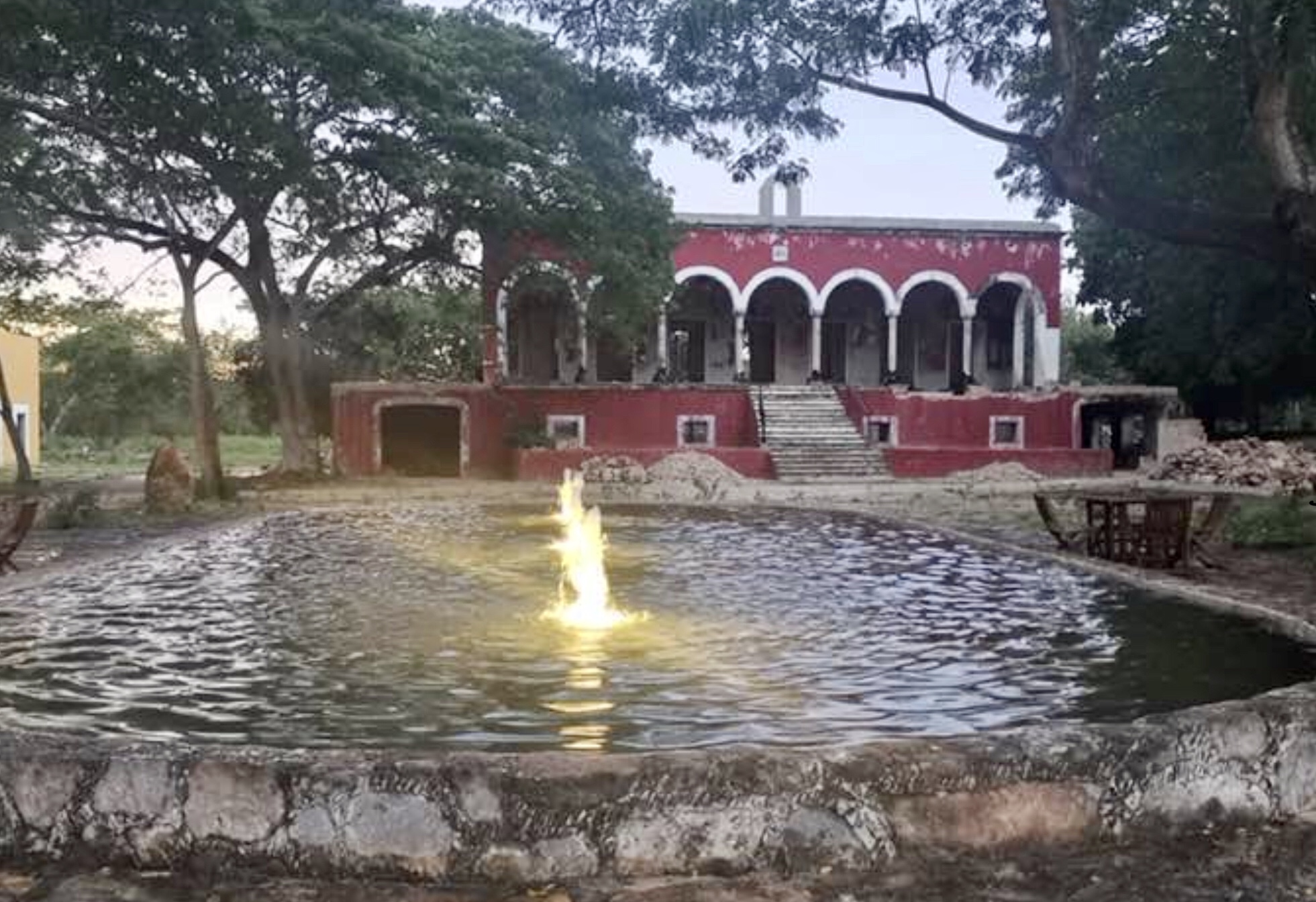
Hacienda Chumichén

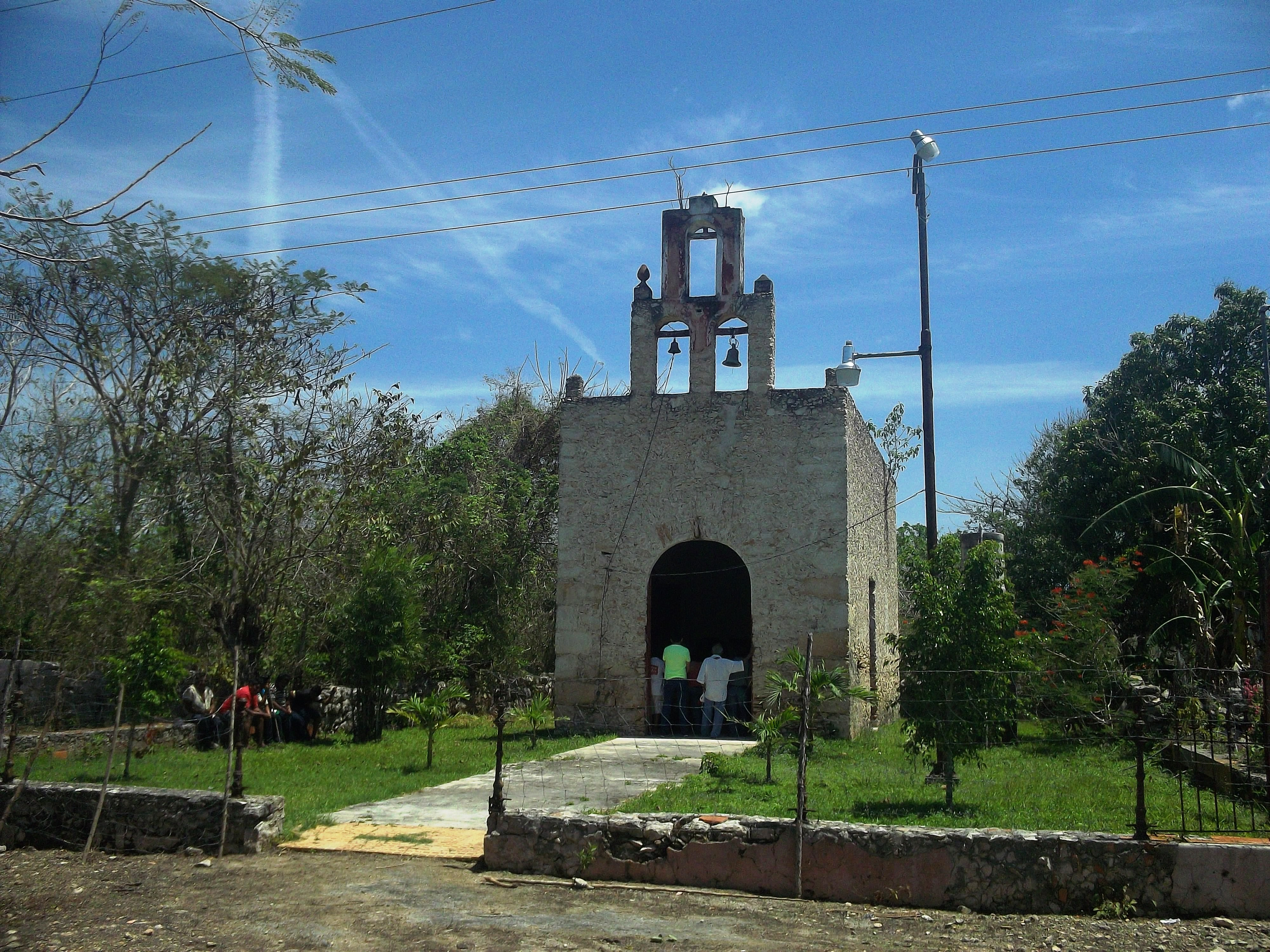
The ruins of the old chapel at Chucmichén.

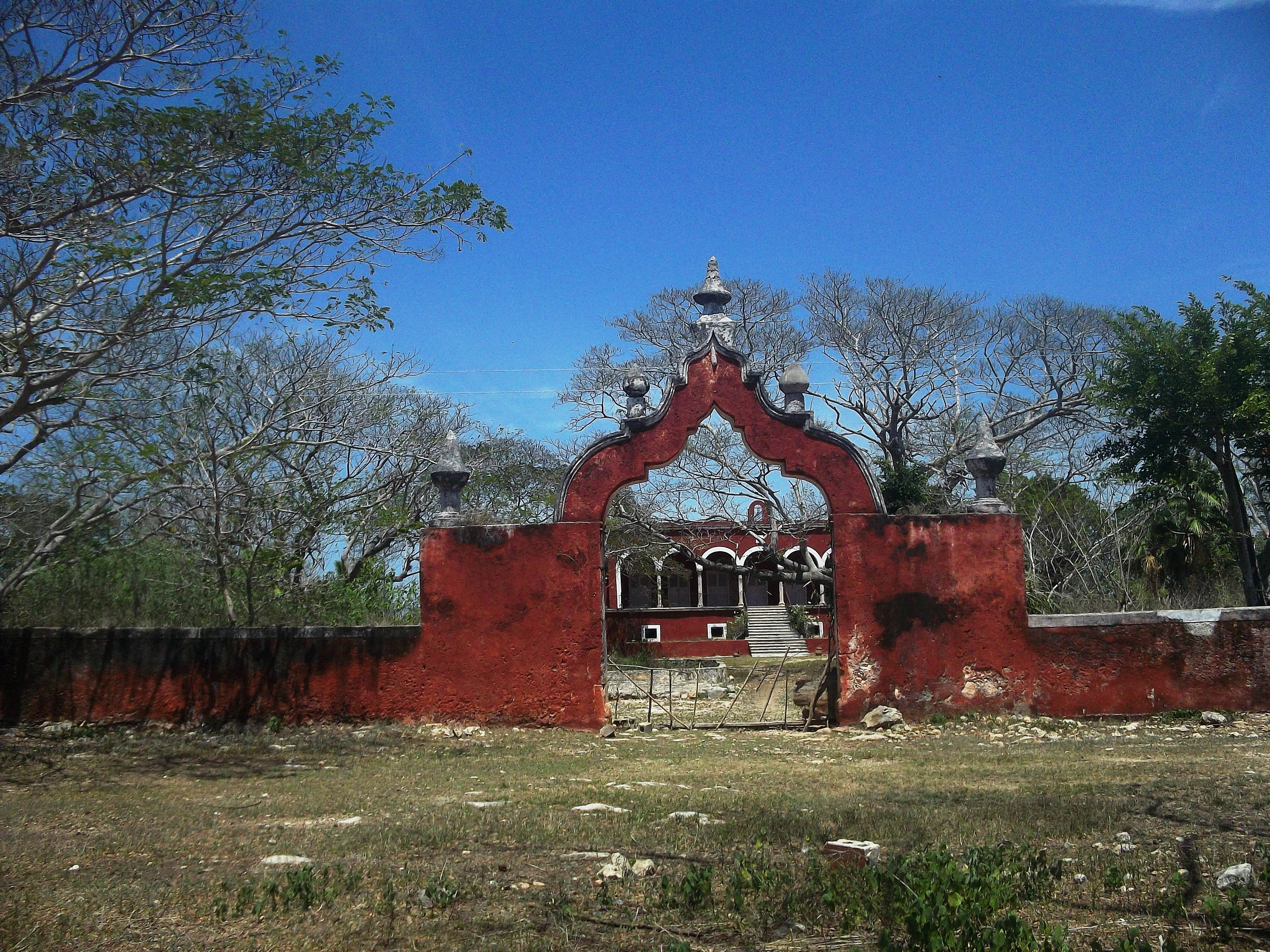
View of Chucmichén.

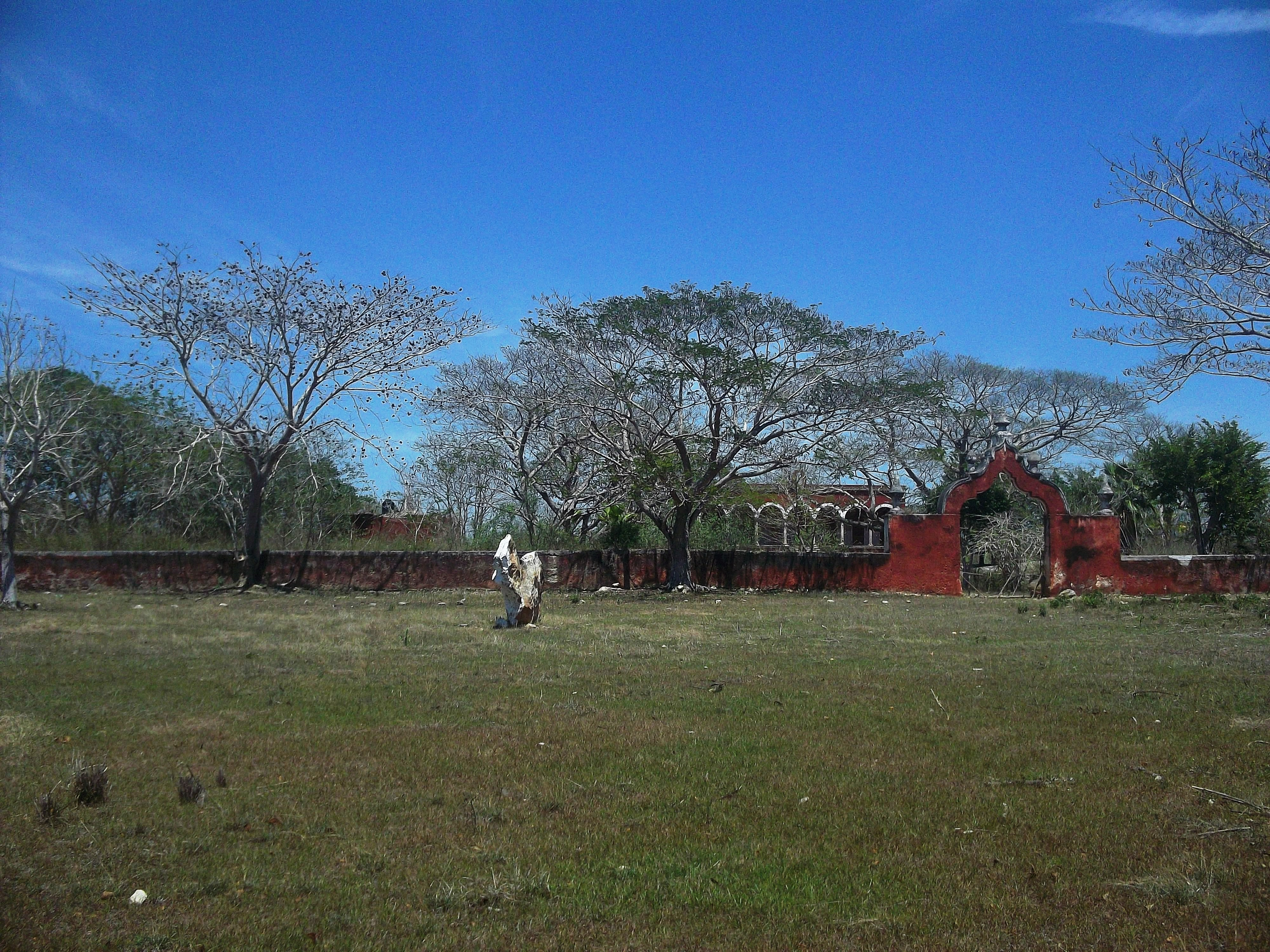
View of Chucmichén.

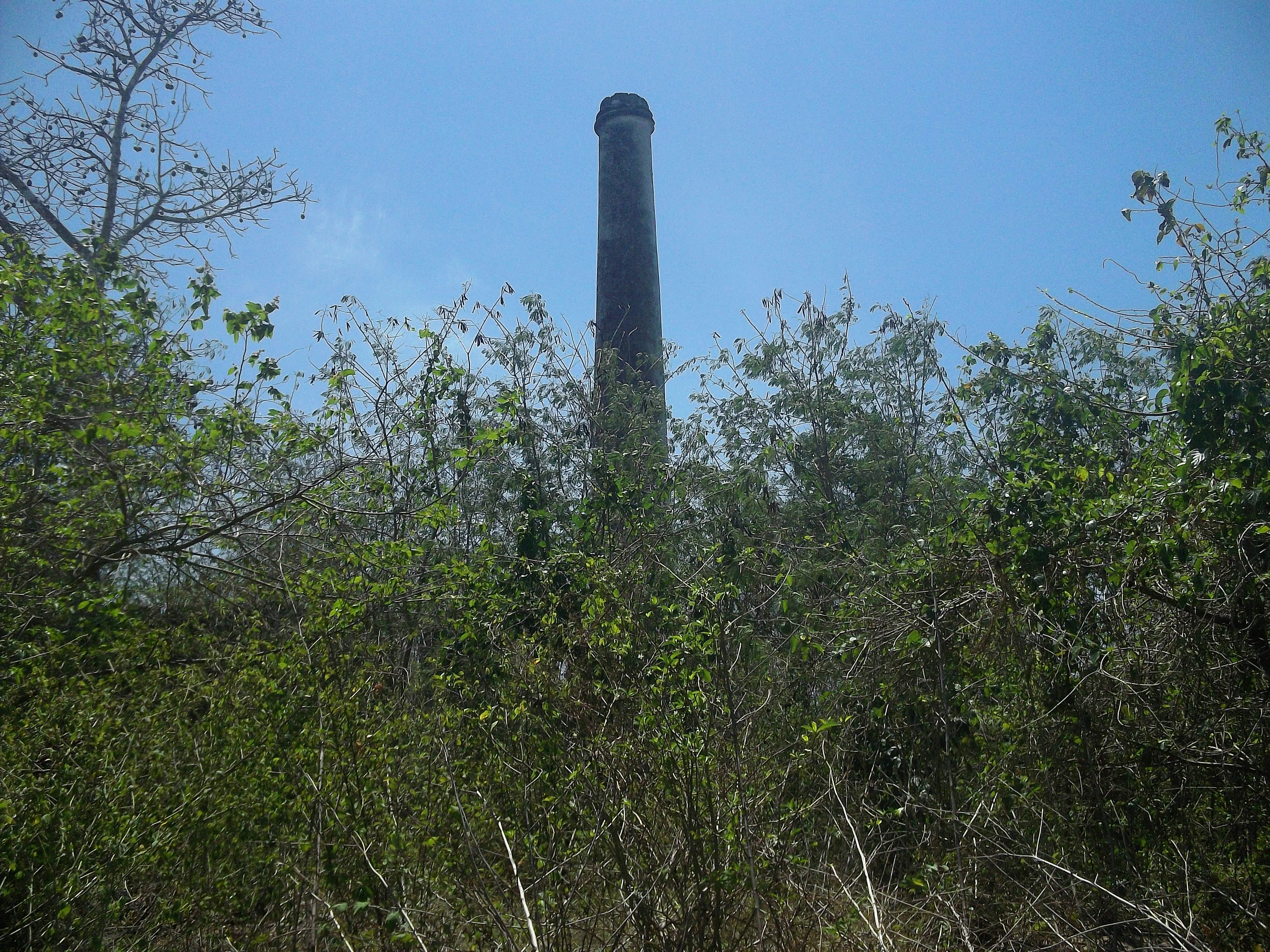
View of Chucmichén.

== See also ==
- Cámara family
- Henequen industry in Yucatán
- Haciendas of Yucatán
- Raymundo Cámara Luján
