= Carlos Peón Machado =

Governor of Yucatán (1894–1897)

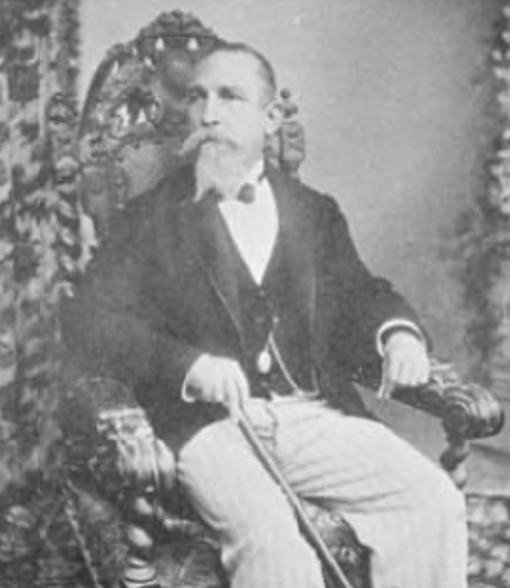

Governor of Yucatan
- In office 1894–1897
- Preceded by: Daniel Traconis
- Succeeded by: Francisco Cantón

Personal details
- Born: Carlos Peón Machado; 1857 Mérida, Yucatán, Mexico
- Died: 1923 (aged 63–64) Mérida, Yucatán, Mexico
- Party: Liberal Party
- Spouse: María de la Concepción Suárez Villamil
- Children: Sara Peón Suárez; Humberto Carlos Peón Suárez
- Parent(s): Felipe Peón Machado (father); María Machado y Machado (mother)
- Education: Instituto Literario de Yucatán

Carlos Peón Machado (1859–1923) was a Mexican lawyer, engineer, landowner, and politician who served as Governor of Yucatán between 1894 and 1897. Due to his immense wealth and political influence, he is considered one of the main figures of the nineteenth-century Yucatecan oligarchy that is known as the Divine Caste (Casta Divina). During his administration, he was responsible for promoting the henequen boom which transformed Yucatán into the wealthiest and most industrialized state in Mexico at the beginning of the twentieth century.

In 1896, in one of his absences from the Governorship, he was temporarily replaced as interim Governor by José Palomeque Solís. Later, in 1897, due to differences with the dictator Porfirio Díaz, he had to resign, handing over the governorship to José María Iturralde Lara, who replaced him until the end of his mandate.

== Family ==
Born in Mérida, Yucatán, in 1859, he was the second son of Felipe Peón Machado and María Machado y Machado. His father, a wealthy landowner, was a sympathizer of the Liberal Party and a first cousin of that homonymous Yucatecan who gave his life defending Girona from the Napoleonic invasion, thus inspiring the pen of Andrés Quintana Roo.

His sister, Nicolasa, was the wife of Eusebio Escalante, an important Yucatecan businessman, industrialist, and landowner. Later, Peón's daughter would marry a son of Escalante.

On his father's side, he descends from the Peón family, a distinguished patrician family that settled in the Yucatán Peninsula in the eighteenth century and could claim descent from Francisco de Montejo, the Spanish conquistador who had led the Yucatán campaign. Throughout the colonial period, the Peón and Cámara families had been the principal landowners in the Yucatán peninsula, owning vast tracts of property.

== Marriage ==
He married María de la Concepción Suárez Villamil, daughter of Joaquín Suárez Cámara, a wealthy landowner related to the Cámara family, and María Villamil Vales. The couple had the following offspring:

- Sara Peón Suárez: married to Eusebio Escalante Peón, the son of Eusebio Escalante Bates and Nicolasa Peón Machado
- Humberto Carlos Peón Suárez: married to Pilar Rosado Almeida, daughter of Pedro Rosado Palomo and María Rosalía Almeida Vadillo.

His great-nephew, Patricio Escalante Guerra, married Cordelia Pino Cámara, the youngest daughter of José María Pino Suárez, Vice-President of Mexico, and María Cámara Vales.

== Education ==
Coat of arms of the Peón family of Yucatán

He graduated from the Colegio de San Ildefonso, a Jesuit-inspired institute that had a curriculum based on that of the French lycées. Later, he studied at Instituto Literario de Yucatán, where he obtained both a degree as an agronomic engineer and a law degree.

== Career ==
Before becoming a politician, Peón acted for twelve years as the administrator of his father's estates, which included Hacienda Tabi, a sugarcane mill that he had industrialized importing a steam engine and decauville railways. Starting in 1873, he also acquired the Hacienda Temozón, one of the most important in the region, that was dedicated to the production of henequen and at its zenith had an area of 6,643 hectares and 640 employees. He also participated in several businesses with his brother-in-law Eusebio Escalante. After the death of his father, Carlos Peón became the head of the Peón family.

The political scene in Yucatan had been divided since the mid-nineteenth century between the Conservatives who had supported the French intervention and the establishment of the Second Mexican Empire led by Maximilian and the Liberals who had resisted the expansionism of Napoleon III. The first group was headed by Francisco Cantón, a conservative and populist politician. The second group was led by Manuel Cepeda Peraza and "rich merchants and landowners such as Carlos Peón Machado, Eusebio Escalante and Alvino Manzanilla stood out amongst their ranks, as well as the future strong man of Yucatán, Olegario Molina". Although both were Liberals, over the years Molina distanced himself from Peón for reasons that "were more economic than political" given Peón's closeness to the Escalante trading house "which represented Molina's most important competition in the henequen trade."

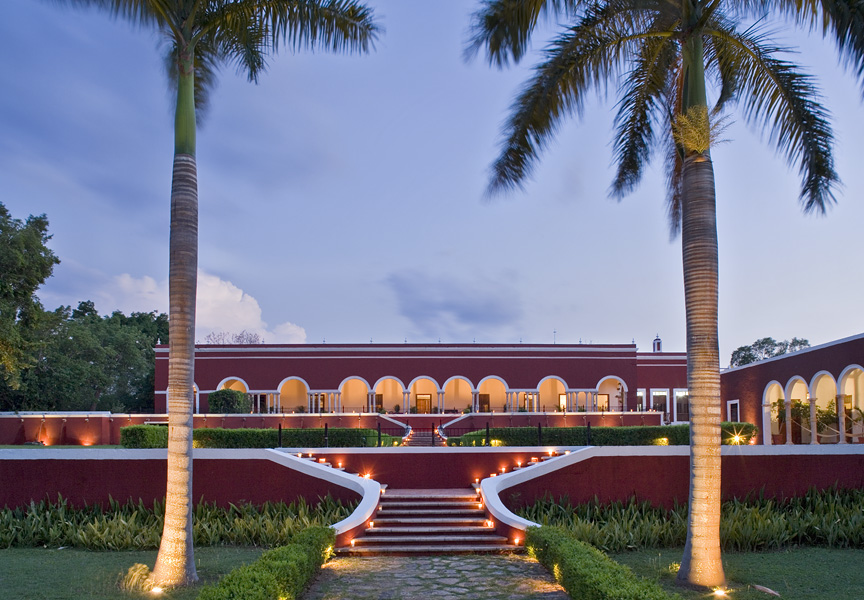
Hacienda Temozón, one of the estates of Carlos Peón

At the beginning of 1875 local elections were held in Yucatán and Eligio Ancona and Carlos Peón were elected, respectively, as Governor and Lieutenant Governor for the period that was to end on January 31, 1878. In November 1876, the Tuxtepec Revolution, a coup d'état led by General Porfirio Díaz, overthrew President Sebastían Lerdo de Tejada, who had been politically close to Ancona and Peón. Both were forced to abandon their posts in December 1876. Lerdo de Tejada was the last civilian president before a military dictatorship that would govern Mexico until 1911.

Despite his estrangement with the porfiriato, Peón remained close to Manuel Romero Rubio, a distinguished politician who, despite, having served in the Lerdo de Tejada administration managed to ingratiate himself with the new regime. Starting in 1881, Romero Rubio became the father-in-law of the dictator Porfirio Díaz and was for many years his Secretary of the Interior, the most powerful position in the Cabinet of Mexico. In 1894, Peón ran as a candidate for Governor of Yucatán with the support of the federal government. His candidacy was attractive because he was considered "an honest millionaire, with an impeccable private life, who is surrounded by the flattery that comes with a high position, enhanced by decent conduct."

He was elected Governor for the four-year term between 1894 and 1898, being the first civilian to hold this position after a long period of military governments. From his predecessor, General Daniel Traconis, he inherited a deep recession. A firm believer in economic liberalism, during his administration he stimulated economic development through private enterprise, particularly concentrating on promoting the henequen industry in Yucatán, which reached its greatest export boom after his term as Governor. The henequen boom would transform Yucatán into the richest and most industrialized state in the entire country at the beginning of the twentieth century; between 1870 and 1920, henequen comprised almost twenty percent of Mexico's total exports, making it the second most important Mexican exportable product after precious metals. In contrast to other plantations in Latin America, Yucatecan entrepreneurs maintained control over the land, physical capital, and transport infrastructure. During the henequen boom, Mérida, the State capital, was once reputed to have more millionaires per capita than any other city in the world.

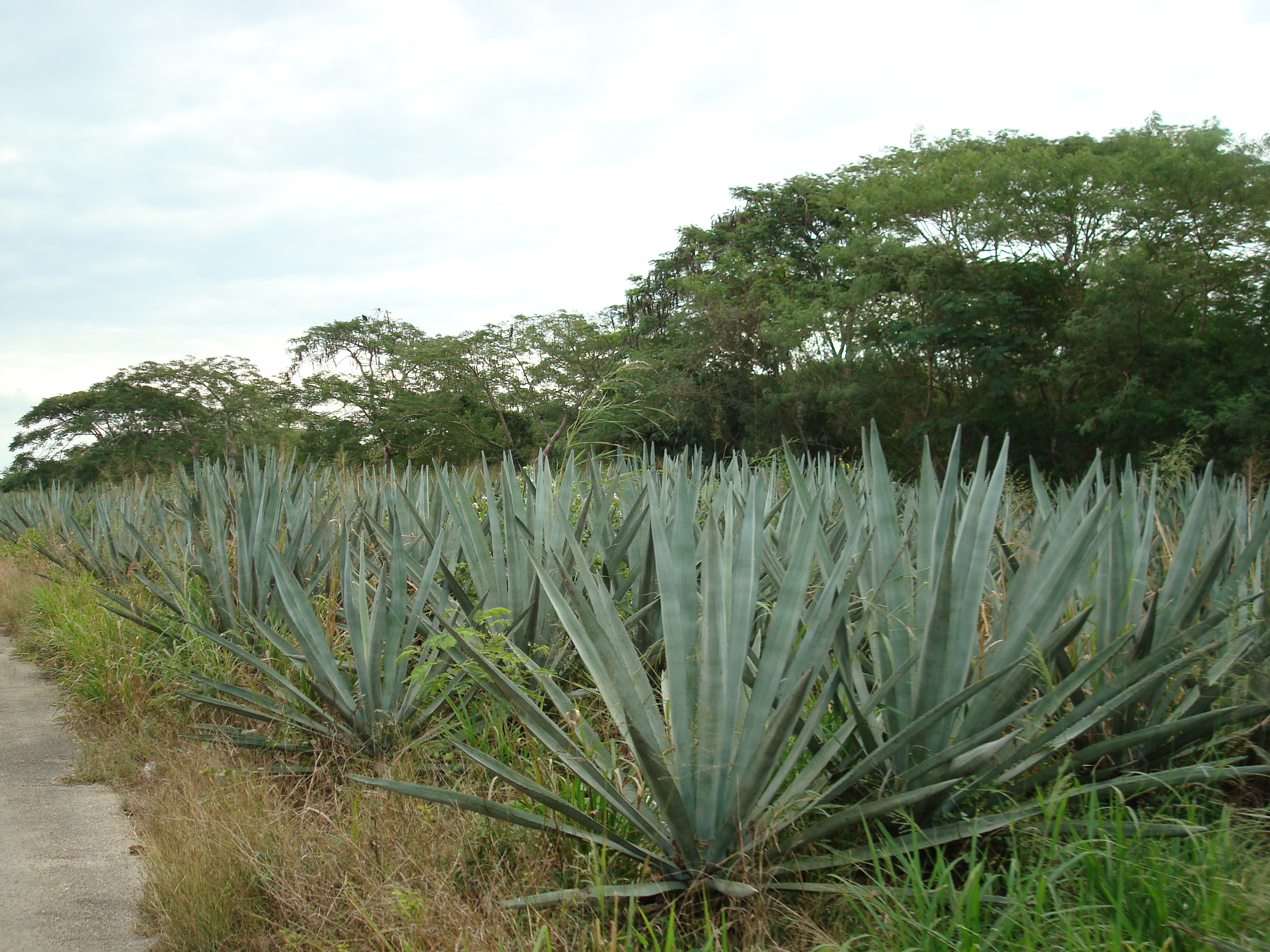
Henequen plantation in Izamal, Yucatán. During his Governorship, Peón promoted the industry causing an economic boom which transformed Yucatán into the wealthiest and most industrialized states in Mexico.

Due to his considerable wealth and political power, Peón is considered one of the main figures of the nineteenth-century Yucatecan oligarchy that came to be known as the Divine Caste.

Additionally, during his administration, Peón was "the promoter of a new law that taxed capital and not property and was responsible for promoting secular education," he created the General Directorate of Statistics and inaugurated the Juarez Penitentiary, the most important prison in Yucatan. He also promulgated the Criminal Law in 1897, shortly before leaving power. Known for his liberalism and inspired by the ideals of the French Revolution, he was a "millionaire landowner [who] loved to present himself as a kind of Yucatecan Count Mirabeau." During his period as Governor, he also attempted to ameliorate the plight of the mayan laborers who worked in the Haciendas in conditions akin to serfdom.

"The faction headed by Peón has been identified as "radical liberal" or "Jacobin", since during his government Peón distinguished himself by his strict application of the Reform laws. His political project included the elimination of the Catholic Church from public life, especially from education, and to enlighten indigenous people and artisans. The tie that kept Carlos Peón united with the federal government was Porfirio Díaz's father-in-law, Minister Manuel Romero Rubio, so when he died in 1895, Peón was left without support in the Mexican capital. After knowing that Porfirio Díaz wanted to support the candidacy of Francisco Cantón to occupy the state governorship, Peón resigned from the governorship."

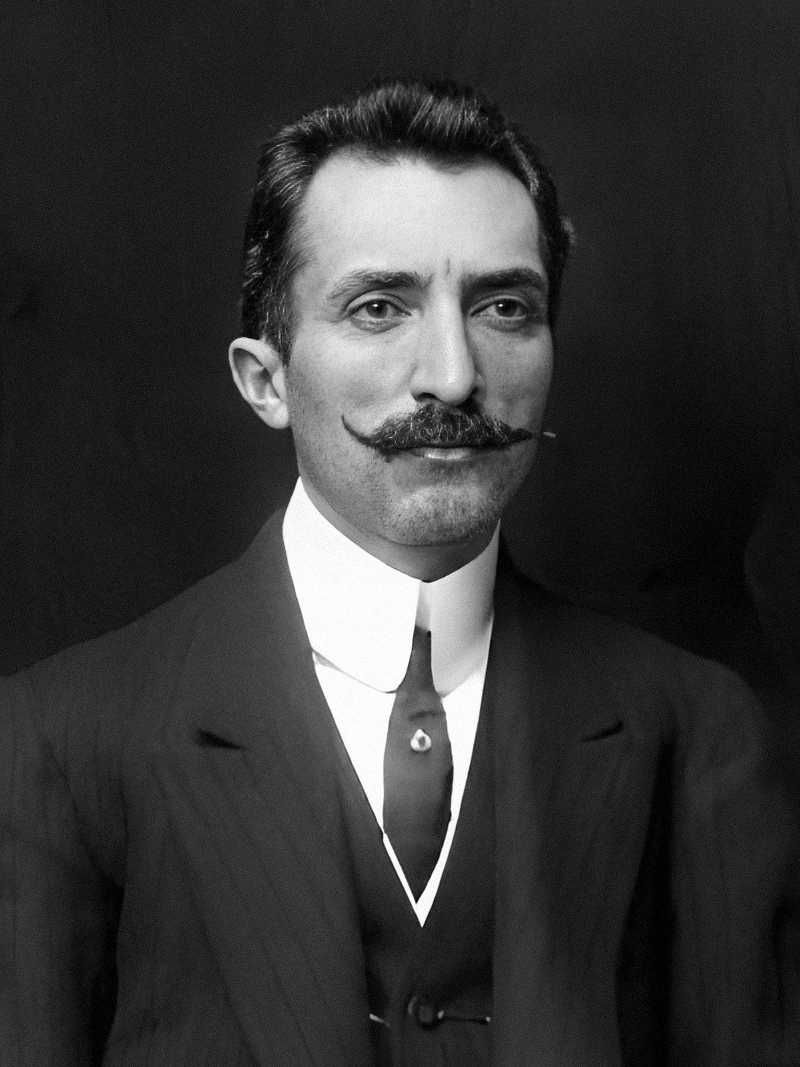
Carlos Peón was the political mentor of José María Pino Suárez.

Since the middle of the year 1897, he had focused his efforts on re-electing himself. After 30 years of liberal governments, Peón had to face one of the most difficult campaigns since he did not have the support of either the federal government or former liberal supporters such as Olegario Molina. In the month of August of that year, Colonel Francisco Cantón launched his candidacy, achieving great popular support and counting with the full-hearted support of his stepbrother, Joaquín Baranda, a long-serving and powerful Secretary of Justice in the cabinet of Porfirio Díaz.

When one of the rallies of Cantón was broken up and violently repressed by the government, Peón was forced to resign his position:

"On August 11, 1897, the supporters of Canton, faced with the possible manipulation of the electoral results by Governor Peón, organized a provocation in order to confront the police and members of the National Guard with their own sympathizers. The result was five deaths and the resignation of Governor Peón. He was replaced by José María Iturralde, who immediately replaced the political leaders of the 16 parties that were supporters of Peón and prepared the triumph of Cantón, who took office on February 1, 1898."

Canton's candidacy also had the support of the clergy who had seen their rights curtailed by the Peón administration. In the following administrations, "the ecclesiastical hierarchy [...] not only recovered the economic power lost since the application of the Reform Laws but became notorious for justifying the miserable living conditions of the serfs."

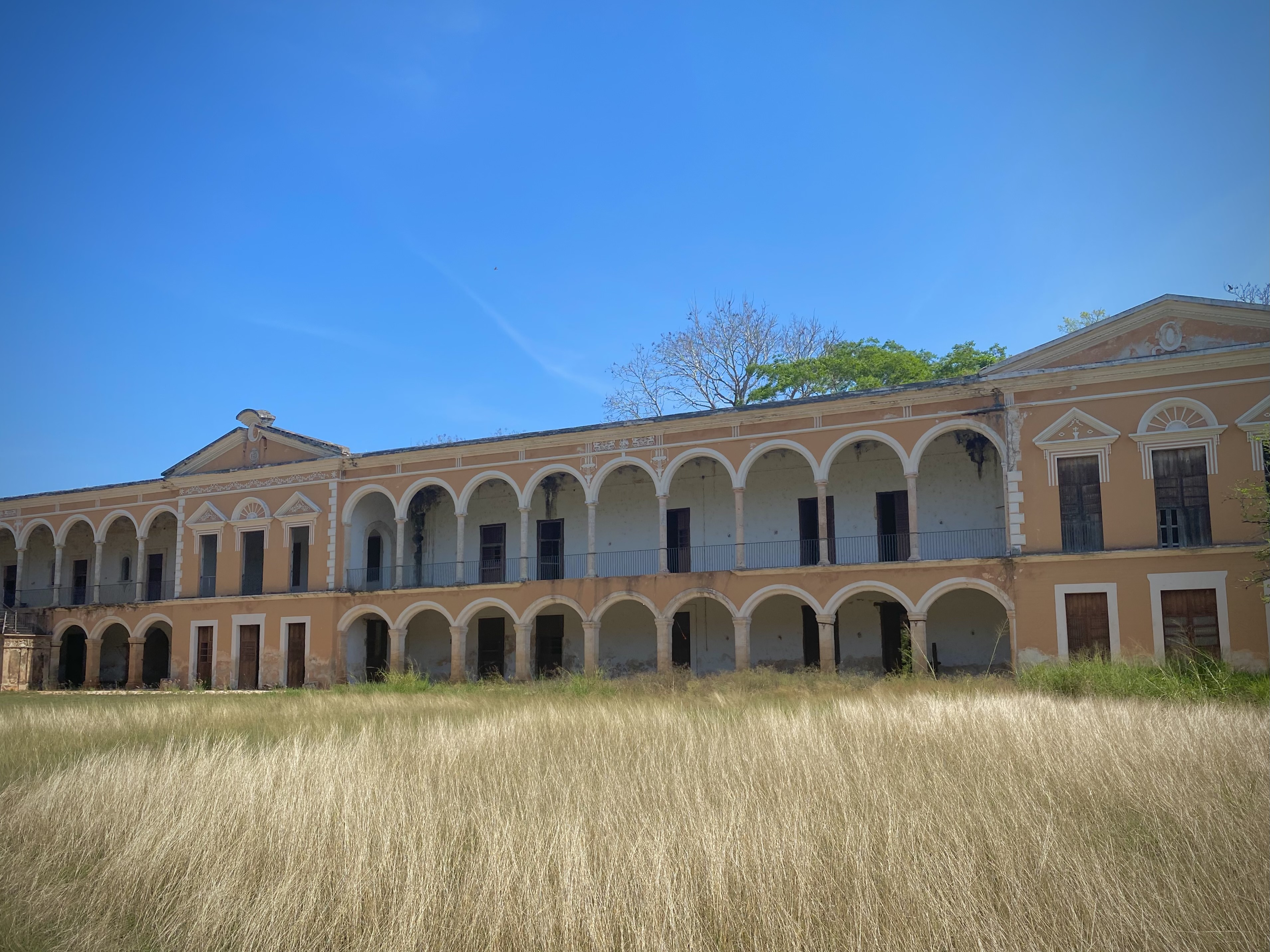
Now in ruins, the Hacienda Tabi once belonged to Carlos Peón.

Upon retiring from political life, Carlos Peón returned to the private sector, where he became a business partner of Eusebio Escalante, his brother-in-law, "in almost all of his companies." Ferrocarriles Unidos de Yucatán, for example, was a profitable railroad company that was controlled by Escalante family and Carlos Peón was appointed chairman of the board of directors.

The panic of 1907 led to the collapse of the Escalante trading house (Casa Escalante), which undoubtedly had a negative effect on Peón's wealth.

Though retired from politics, Carlos Peón found his ideological successor in José María Pino Suárez, who would later serve as Vice-President of Mexico. Pino Suárez was married to María Cámara Vales, a member of the Cámara clan, a patrician family that had close-knit familial and business bonds with the Peón clan that dated back to the colonial period. "Pino inherited all the urban and rural electorate that had been loyal to Peón, led by various landowners and businessmen and part of the intelligentsia of Mérida." Among Pino's close collaborators was Peón's son, Humberto Carlos Peón Suárez, who in 1911 was elected alderman of the Mérida city council, while Fernando Solís León served as Mayor" and Pino served as Governor.

In 1911, during the visit of Francisco I. Madero to Yucatán, campaigning for Pino, he was hosted by Peón at Hacienda Temozón. Similarly, in 1923, he received Álvaro Obregón at his property when he was a candidate for the presidency of the republic.

He died in Mérida, Yucatán, on September 11, 1923.

== Pérez Codex ==
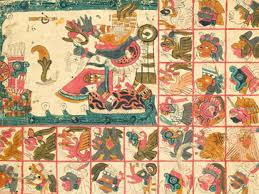
Pérez Codex

The Pérez Codex is the name given to the extensive document compiled by Juan Pío Pérez, a nineteenth-century philologist, which contains a series of fragmentary copies of various books of the Chilam Balam, gathered for the purpose of carrying out the chronological studies undertaken by this wise researcher. of the Mayan culture in Yucatan.

After the death of Pío Pérez, the Codex was gifted to Carlos Peón. Peón later loaned it to Crescensio Carrillo y Ancona, he Archbishop of Yucatán, who returned it to him a few years later stating: "as I am no longer the director of the Yucatecan Museum, for which I wanted to have the manuscript, I believed it my duty to deliver it back to Mr. Peón, whose illustration and patriotism will inspire him to preserve it for posterity and for science." Peón, in life, gifted the codex to his sister Nicolasa Peón, wife of Eusebio Escalante.
