= Divine Caste =

Elite families in the Yucatán Peninsula during the 19th and early 20th centuries

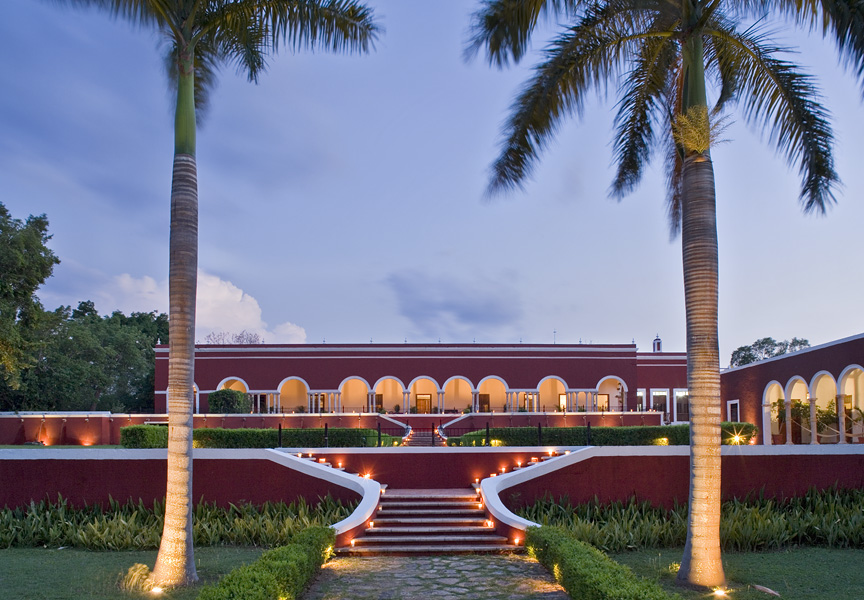
Hacienda Temozón, one of the principal henequen haciendas in Yucatán. It belonged to the Peón family.

The divine caste, known as "la casta divina" in Spanish, refers to a group of wealthy and influential families in the Yucatán Peninsula during the 19th and early 20th centuries. They were considered the social and intellectual elite of the region and held significant cultural, political, and economic power.

A few members of the divine caste traced their lineage back to the early Spanish conquistadors and settlers of Yucatan. They were predominantly Criollos, which refers to individuals of Spanish descent born in the Americas. These families maintained close ties with the Catholic Church and held positions of prominence in government, law, business, and academia. They played a significant role in shaping the intellectual and cultural life of Mérida and the Yucatán peninsula. Their influence extended beyond the local sphere, with some members of the caste holding positions of national importance.

the term "divine caste" was not self-appointed by the Yucatecan elite. It was a designation used by their critics and others to describe them. Instead, the Yucatecan elite preferred to refer to themselves as the "decent people" or "gente decente," which conveyed a sense of social superiority and moral rectitude due to their adherence to societal norms, conservative Catholicism, European cultural influences, and refined lifestyles.

This exclusive group, composed of about twenty families, exerted control over the henequen industry, which transformed Yucatán into Mexico's wealthiest and most industrialized state in the early 20th century. During Yucatan's Gilded Age, which lasted roughly between 1870 and 1920, Yucatecan henequen accounted for nearly twenty percent of Mexico's total exports. Out of its haciendas came 90% of the sacks and rope consumed internationally. Both goods were considered essential in the context of the Second Industrial Revolution and the naval arms races between the Great Powers as the world prepared for World War I. Henequen "crossed all borders. It was sold everywhere: binder twine in the United States; silk in Germany and henequen sacks throughout the Americas. In other words, it almost became an article of first necessity in the entire world." By 1900, Yucatán was exporting 81 million kilograms of henequen to the United States each year, roughly 178.5 million pounds priced at $9.48 USD per pound. Solely from their exports to the United States, henequen exporters were generating annual revenue of roughly $1.7 billion USD. Adjusted for inflation, this 1900 annual revenue would amount to approximately $62 billion USD in 2023. Unlike other plantations in Latin America, the leading Yucatecan families retained ownership over land, physical capital, and infrastructure. The henequen boom led Mérida, the state capital, to boast more millionaires per capita than any other city in the world.

By the early 20th century, the divine caste experienced internal divisions, reflecting a power struggle between the traditional upper-class families that had long dominated the Yucatán peninsula and Olegario Molina, who aimed to monopolize the henequen industry, acting on behalf of J.P. Morgan and the International Harvester, an American conglomerate. The social upheaval caused by the Mexican Revolution (1910-1920) significantly impacted the divine caste's political influence. The revolution brought about profound changes in Mexican society, including the redistribution of land and wealth. As a result, the divine caste lost much of its power and control over the henequen industry. Nonetheless, descendants of the Yucatecan elite continued to be active in public life even after the decline of the divine caste's political influence. Their historical legacy and contributions to the development of Yucatán and Mexico as a whole remain noteworthy.

== Origins of the term ==
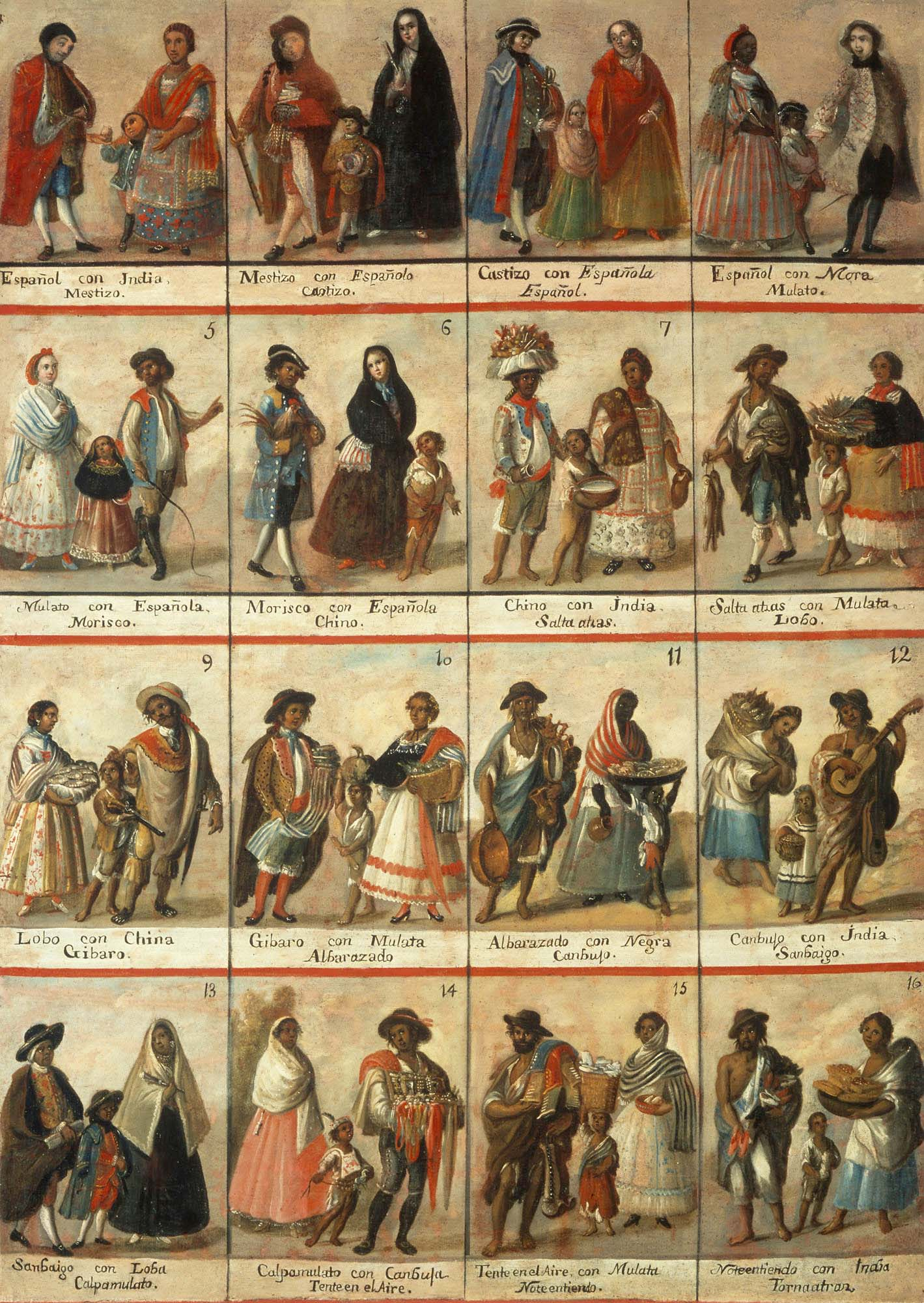
Casta painting showing 16 racial groupings. At the top of the social pyramid in the colonial period were the peninsulares and criollos.

Casta is a word existing in Spanish, Portuguese and other Iberian languages since the Middle Ages, meaning "lineage". Casta gave rise to the English word caste during the early modern period.

In the colonial era, the term "caste" in the context of Spanish America referred to the social hierarchy and racial classification system that emerged as a result of intermixing between Indigenous peoples, Europeans (Spaniards), and Africans. The caste system categorized individuals based on their racial and ethnic backgrounds, assigning them specific legal and social statuses.

The castes in New Spain included categories such as "peninsulares" (those born in Spain), "criollos" (people of Spanish descent born in the Americas), "mestizos" (people of mixed Indigenous and Spanish ancestry), "mulattos" (people of mixed African and Spanish ancestry), "zambos" (people of mixed Indigenous and African ancestry), and others. Each caste had its own social and legal privileges or restrictions, and the system was primarily designed to maintain the dominance of peninsulares and criollos and ensure a strict racial hierarchy.

The term "caste" later also came to be associated with the caste system in India of dividing society into hierarchical groups based on birth, occupation, and social status. In New England, for example, the term "caste" is often used to refer to a social elite known as the Boston Brahmins. The Boston Brahmins were a group of wealthy and influential families who held significant social, cultural, and political power in the region during the 19th and early 20th centuries. They were typically of English Protestant (WASP) descent and traced their lineage back to the early Puritan settlers. The term "Brahmin" was borrowed from Hinduism, where it referred to the highest priestly caste.

Similarly, the term "divine caste" was coined to emphasize the perceived superiority of the Yucatecan elite over the rest of society, reinforcing a hierarchical system that favored a small, privileged group. They were typically of Spanish Catholic descent and, in a few cases, traced their lineage back to the early colonial period.

The term "divine caste" was not self-appointed by the Yucatecan elite but rather a term used by others to describe them. Instead, they would have referred to themselves as "gente decente" (the decent people), a designation that carried a sense of social superiority and moral rectitude. It reflected their belief that they were the epitome of sophistication, culture, and virtue. The Yucatecan elite considered themselves as the inheritors of a long-standing traditions, priding themselves on adhering to certain societal norms and values. They upheld conservative Catholicism, embraced European cultural influences, and maintained refined lifestyles. They were known for their education, etiquette, and participation in intellectual and cultural pursuits. By aligning themselves with these ideals, they distinguished themselves from the perceived moral deficiencies and cultural shortcomings they sometimes attributed to the lower classes.

Meanwhile, critics of the social group referred to them as the "fifty henequen kings" (John Kenneth Turner), the "divine caste" (Salvador Alvarado) or the "henequen aristocracy". They argue that it perpetuated an elitist and exclusionary social structure, and it has been a subject of debate and critique in discussions on social class and privilege in Mexican society.

While the origin of the term "divine caste" has been attributed to Salvador Alvarado, the leader of the constitutionalist army in the southeastern region of Mexico and governor of Yucatán from 1915 to 1917, during the Mexican Revolution, other sources note that the term was coined since the late 19th century to describe the Yucatecan elite, who established their dominance following the Caste War and took advantage of their economic power derived from the complete control of the henequen agro-industry.

== History ==
During the colonial period, the criollos, people of Spanish descent born in the Americas, assumed a privileged position and formed a regional elite, concentrating ownership over large estates, known as latifundios. Several prominent families emerged in Yucatán who had already begun accumulating wealth before Independence. These included the Peón and Cámara families, known for their extensive landholdings and employing a strict marital policy as one of their primary strategies to strengthen their social position, allowing them to forge their regional influence and solidify their status within the Mexican nobility.

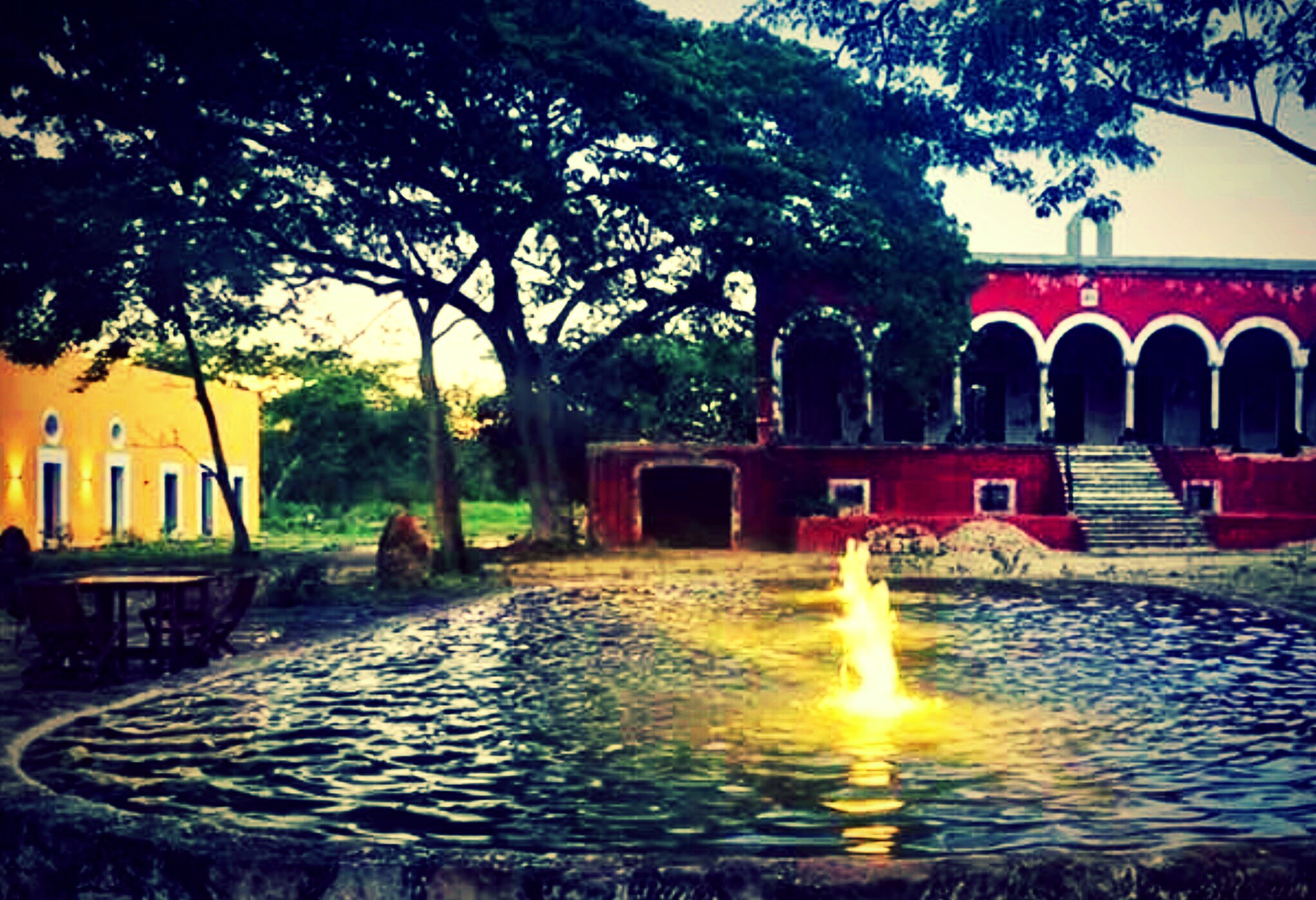
Hacienda Chucmichén, a henequen hacienda in Temax, Yucatán.

While there was a certain degree of social and economic mobility after Mexican Independence, political mobility remained limited. Unlike the situation in central Mexico, where the criollo elites maintained their economic power while ceding political power to mestizos (people of mixed European and indigenous descent) to legitimize the new Republic, the Yucatecan criollo elite maintained their dominance over political, economic and social spheres.

The Caste War of Yucatán was a major conflict that took place from 1847 to 1901. It was a prolonged and violent uprising led by the indigenous Maya people against the ruling criollo elite and their mestizo allies. During the Caste War, the henequen industry paradoxically flourished despite the ongoing conflict.

Henequen and sisal are plants native to Yucatán. Their strong fiber had various commercial applications, particularly in the production of rope and twine, which were in high demand during the industrial revolution. The durability and versatility of henequen fiber made it valuable for industries such as shipping, construction, and agriculture. Yucatán provided ideal conditions for henequen cultivation, with a climate conducive to its growth and vast fertile land.

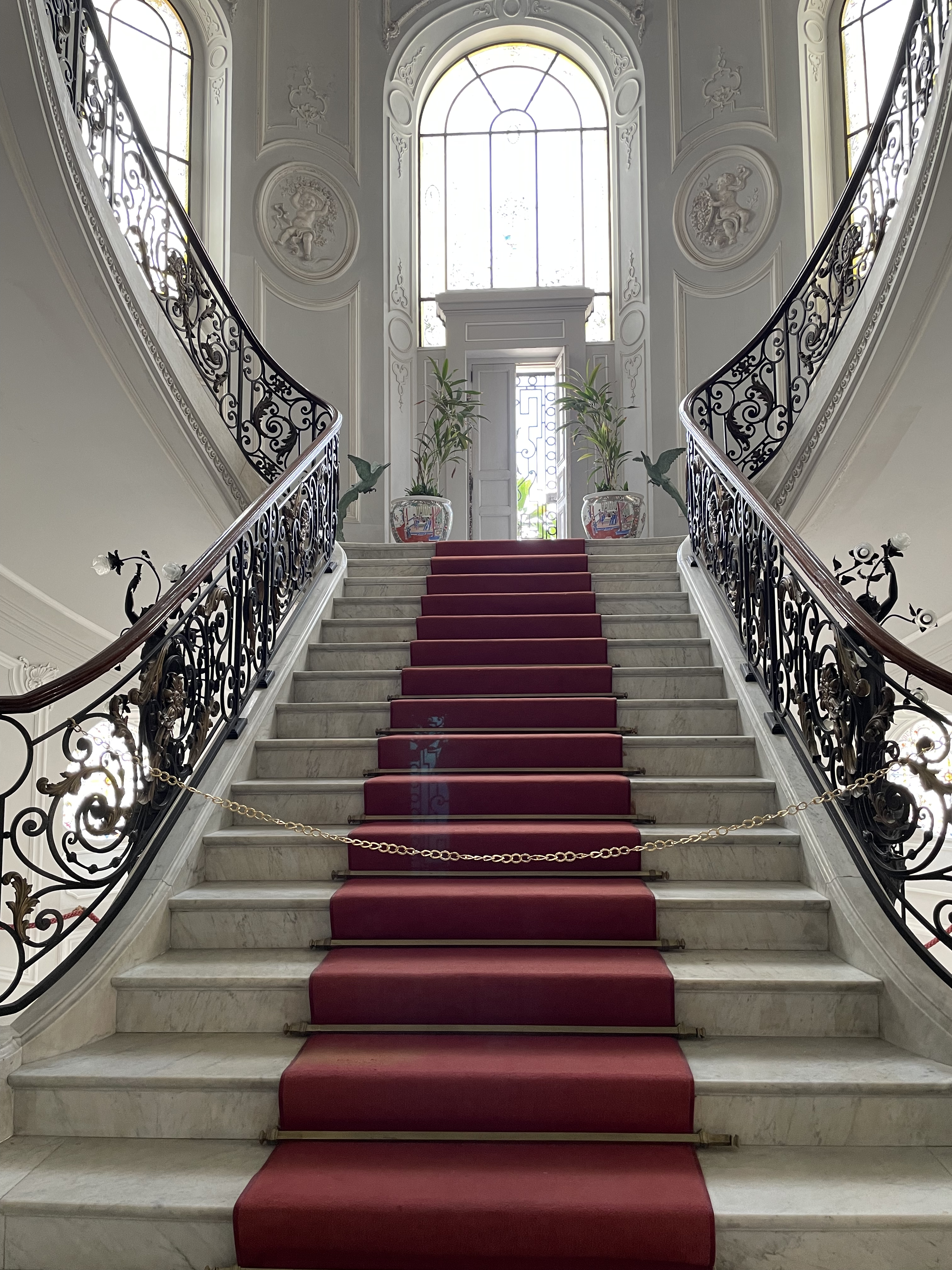
The Cámara Houses were constructed in the fashionable Beaux-Arts style by Gustave Umbdenstock, a French architect. Built for the Cámara family, they exemplify the prosperity attained by some elite families between 1870 and 1920.

In the mid-nineteenth century, Eusebio Escalante Castillo developed the henequen industry in Yucatán with financing from Thebaud Brothers, a New York City-based investment bank. The henequen industry thrived, resulting in increased production and exportation. Yucatán became the world's leading henequen producer, enjoying a virtual monopoly on the market. The demand for henequen fiber from the United States and industrialized nations in Europe, brought substantial profits to Yucatecan landowners and businessmen, contributing to the social and economic development of the region. While the Caste War disrupted many aspects of life in the region, including the social and economic structures, the henequen plantations managed to maintain their productivity and profitability. One of the main reasons for this was the geographic distribution of the conflict. The Caste War primarily concentrated in the eastern and southern parts of the Yucatán Peninsula, where the majority of indigenous Maya communities were located. The henequen plantations, on the other hand, were primarily situated in the northern and western regions. These areas, which were less affected by the immediate impact of the war, continued henequen cultivation and production. The plantations in the northern and western regions were often owned by wealthy criollo families who managed to maintain control over their estates. They were able to protect their properties from direct attacks or secure support from government forces, enabling them to sustain henequen operations.

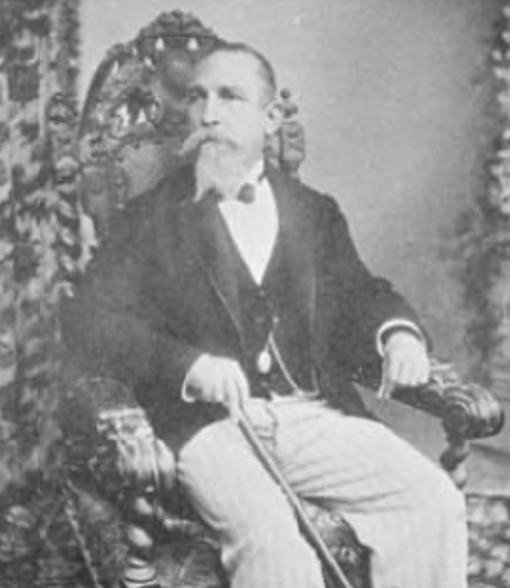
Carlos Peón, Governor of Yucatán (1894–97)

Additionally, some Maya communities who were not actively involved in the rebellion continued to work on the henequen plantations. This was often due to economic necessity, as the henequen industry provided employment opportunities and a means to earn a living. The plantations offered a source of income and stability, even amidst the turbulent conditions of the war.

The wealth generated by the henequen industry was concentrated in a small group of criollo families, oftentimes with close ties of kinship:

"Between 1880 and 1915 there were about 1,000 henequen haciendas in Yucatán, of which 850 had shredding and packing plants, in the hands of approximately 400 families. But a group of 20 or 30 families, which concentrated ownership of the land, was capable of extracting 50% of henequen, of controlling nearly 90% of its exportation, of directing, of course, the regional political destinies; in other words, they formed an oligarchy. Among its most prominent members were Eusebio Escalante Castillo, Eusebio Escalante Bates, Carlos Peón Machado, Pedro Peón Contreras, Leandro León Ayala, Raymundo Cámara Luján, José María Ponce Solís, Enrique Muñoz Arístegui, Olegario Molina Solís and Avelino Montes."

These families' dominance in henequen production and trade established them as some of the wealthiest in the Americas.

"The gente decente who had timidly gone to Havana in the 1850’s could now elbow their way confidently past bowing waiters to the roulette tables of San Remo with the silver Peruvians, the cattle-Argentines, and the steel Americans. French lessons became the rage in the best circles of local society and, once a year, a team of Parisian milliners and modistes visited Mérida to take orders from the grandest dames. At least once a year, Yucatecos made sure to polish their newly acquired linguistic skills and exhibit their sartorial splendor abroad, and local social columnists faithfully reported their European triumphs."

Carlos Peón, a liberal politician and landowner, governed Yucatán from 1894 to 1897. He strongly advocated for economic liberalism and focused on promoting industrial development, particularly in the henequen production and export industry. Peón's successors, Francisco Cantón (Conservative) and Olegario Molina (Liberal), continued to support and actively participate in the henequen industry.

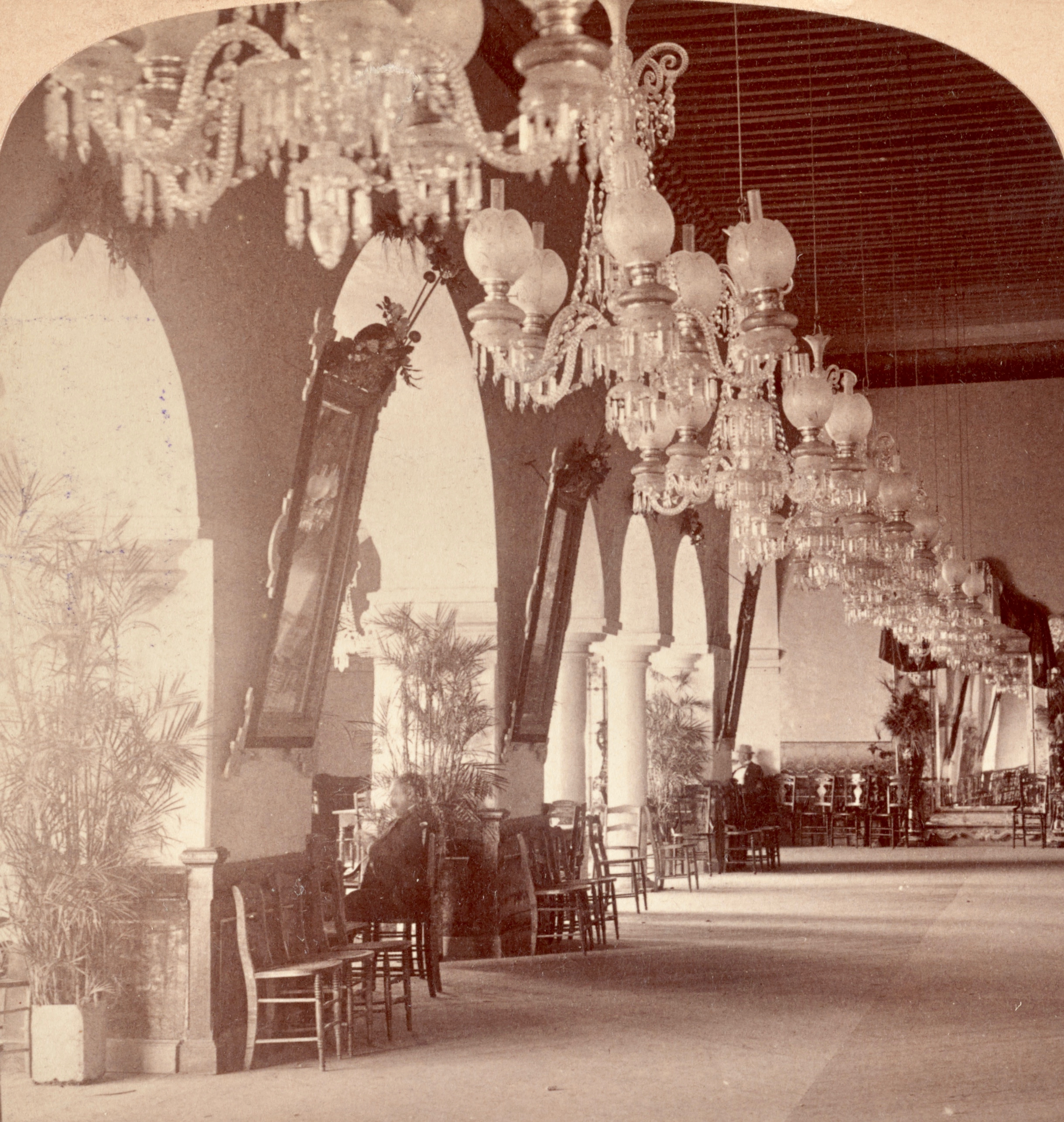
Interior of the Spanish Club at Mérida, Yucatán in 1901. It was one of the élite social clubs associated with the Yucatecan elite.

The elite social clubs of Mérida, such as "El Liceo", "La Unión", "La Lonja Meridiana" or the Spanish Club of Mérida, were exclusively reserved for industrialists, landowners and politicians of European descent, categorically excluding outsiders, including wealthy Lebanese businessmen, referred to as "the berber caste". Among these clubs, "La Lonja Meridana" was the most exclusive:

"A group of Yucatecan businessmen and landowners joined their interests and capital to form a social club. Taking advantage of the economic situation that Yucatan went through, a group of conservative industrialists, which included members of the regional Porfirian oligarchy such as Eusebio Escalante Bates, Raymundo Cámara Luján and Agustín Vales Castillo, the clique close to the newly elected governor, General Francisco Cantón, founded La Lonja Meridiana."

In 1902, following the conclusion of the Caste War, President Porfirio Díaz seized the opportunity to exert his political power by rejecting the candidacy of Francisco Cantón, a conservative, for the governorship of Yucatán. Instead, Díaz favored Olegario Molina, a liberal candidate. This decision, despite facing protests from various sectors of the Yucatecan population, had significant repercussions for the region. That same year, President Díaz implemented two actions that had detrimental effects on the area: the separation of Quintana Roo from Yucatecan territory and the renunciation of Mexico's territorial claim over Belize. These measures, ordered by Díaz, also elicited opposition and concerns from various segments of the Yucatecan population.

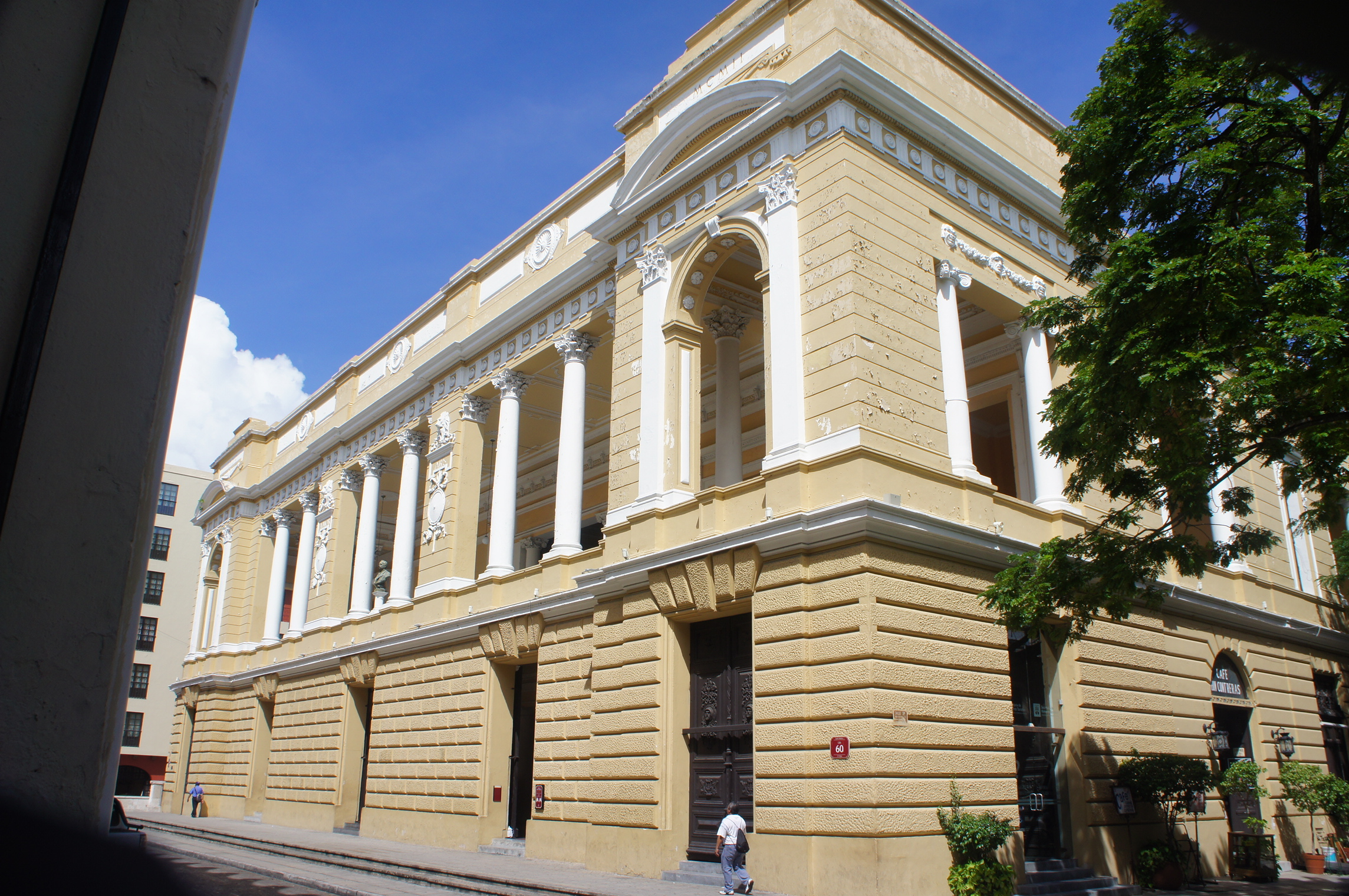
During the henequen boom, "Mérida was transformed [...] "the White City" or the "Paris of Mexico" was spotless and modern, an appropriate seat for Yucatan's millionaires"

Francisco Cantón, compelled to retreat from public life, decided to sell off all his businesses to Eusebio Escalante. The Escalante family, renowned for their involvement in the henequen industry in Yucatán, stood as one of the wealthiest families in Mexico during the turn of the 20th century. However, following 1902, a formidable contender emerged in the form of Olegario Molina. Despite his humble origins in poverty, Molina skillfully amassed a significant fortune under the patronage of President Díaz and his influential advisors, known as "los Científicos." Molina's ascension to prominence was further solidified during his tenure as the Governor of Yucatán from 1902 to 1906. Subsequently, he secured a position in the Cabinet of Mexico as the Secretary of Commerce and Industry, serving from 1906 to 1911.

By 1900, the United States was importing 81 million kilograms of henequen annually (approximately 178.5 million pounds). In 1902, American financier John Pierpont Morgan merged the McCormick Harvesting Machine Company and Deering Harvester Company, along with three smaller agricultural equipment firms, to form International Harvester. Cyrus McCormick was appointed as the head of this newly organized consortium. What had once been competing companies were now united under Morgan's leadership. The United States, being the primary importer of henequen at the time, transitioned from being a price taker to a price maker, with the ability to dictate prices to Yucatecan henequen producers. In October of that year, Molina met with Cyrus McCormick in Havana, Cuba to finalize a secret agreement. According to this agreement, the American conglomerate committed to exclusively importing henequen from Molina's company, acting as an intermediary between the henequen plantation owners and the American markets. In return, Molina pledged to use "every effort within his power to depress the price of sisal fiber," and McCormick would only pay him "prices that will be dictated from time to time by the I.H. Co." As a result of the secret agreement between McCormick and Molina, the price of henequen dropped from fluctuating in the market at around $9.48 USD per pound to a fixed rate of just 8 cents per pound.

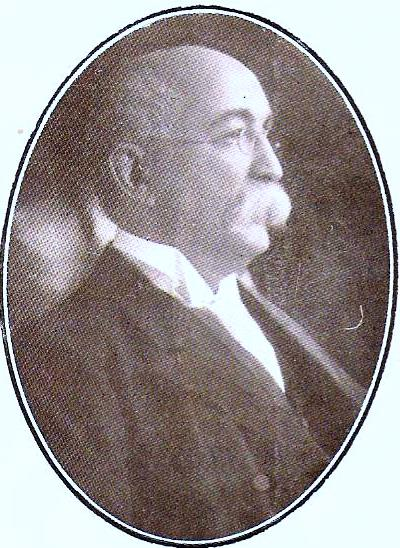
Olegario Molina, Governor of Yucatán (1902 - 1906)

As a result of this secret agreement, Olegario Molina became "the largest landowner in the state and the largest individual producer of henequen." However, his growing power and wealth made him the primary adversary of fellow landowners. This group of capitalists included "the traditional landowners, encomendero, and cattle-owning families whose prestige dated back to the colonial period, and who had shown a remarkable ability to adapt to the changing economic order." Eusebio Escalante, José María Ponce, Carlos Peón, and Raymundo Cámara were prominent members of this group.

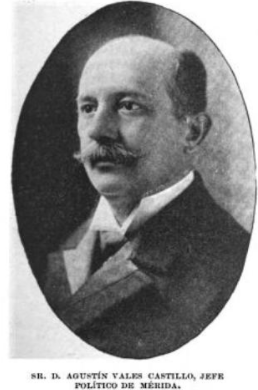
Agustín Vales Castillo, a landowner and industrialist, served as Prefect of Mérida (1902 - 08).

After the Panic of 1907, the Escalante trading house faced a significant decline, providing Molina with an opportunity to exploit the situation. He capitalized on his rival's downfall, consolidating himself as the primary exporter of henequen by artificially suppressing prices to gain control over the market. Molina employed a combination of political influence, cronyism, and monopolistic business practices to strengthen his business empire and eliminate his competitors. Nevertheless, by 1907, Olegario Molina had emerged as the most prominent figure within the Yucatecan elite:

“Chief among the henequen kings of Yucatan is Olegario Molina, the Secretary of Commerce and a former Governor of Yucatán. Molina’s estates in Yucatán and Quintana Roo, cover more than 15,000,000 acres or 23,000 square miles – a small kingdom in itself. The fifty henequen kings live in costly palaces in Mérida and many of them have homes abroad. They travel a great deal, usually they speak several different languages and they and their families are a most cultivated class of people. All of the Yucatan Peninsula is dependent on the fifty henequen kings. Naturally these men are in control of the political machinery of their state, and naturally they operated the machinery for their own benefit."

Due to Molina's growing influence in the economic and political spheres of the state, numerous landowners belonging to the traditional families (Cámara, Peón, Escalante, Ponce, etc) were compelled to unite in order to challenge his power:

"During that period, the first association of henequen landowners emerged with the primary aim of defending themselves against the group led by Olegario Molina and his son-in-law Avelino Montes. The challenges they faced were formidable. Molina wielded substantial economic and political power [...] These circumstances caused a rift to develop between the various associations of henequen landowners and the local and federal government authorities."

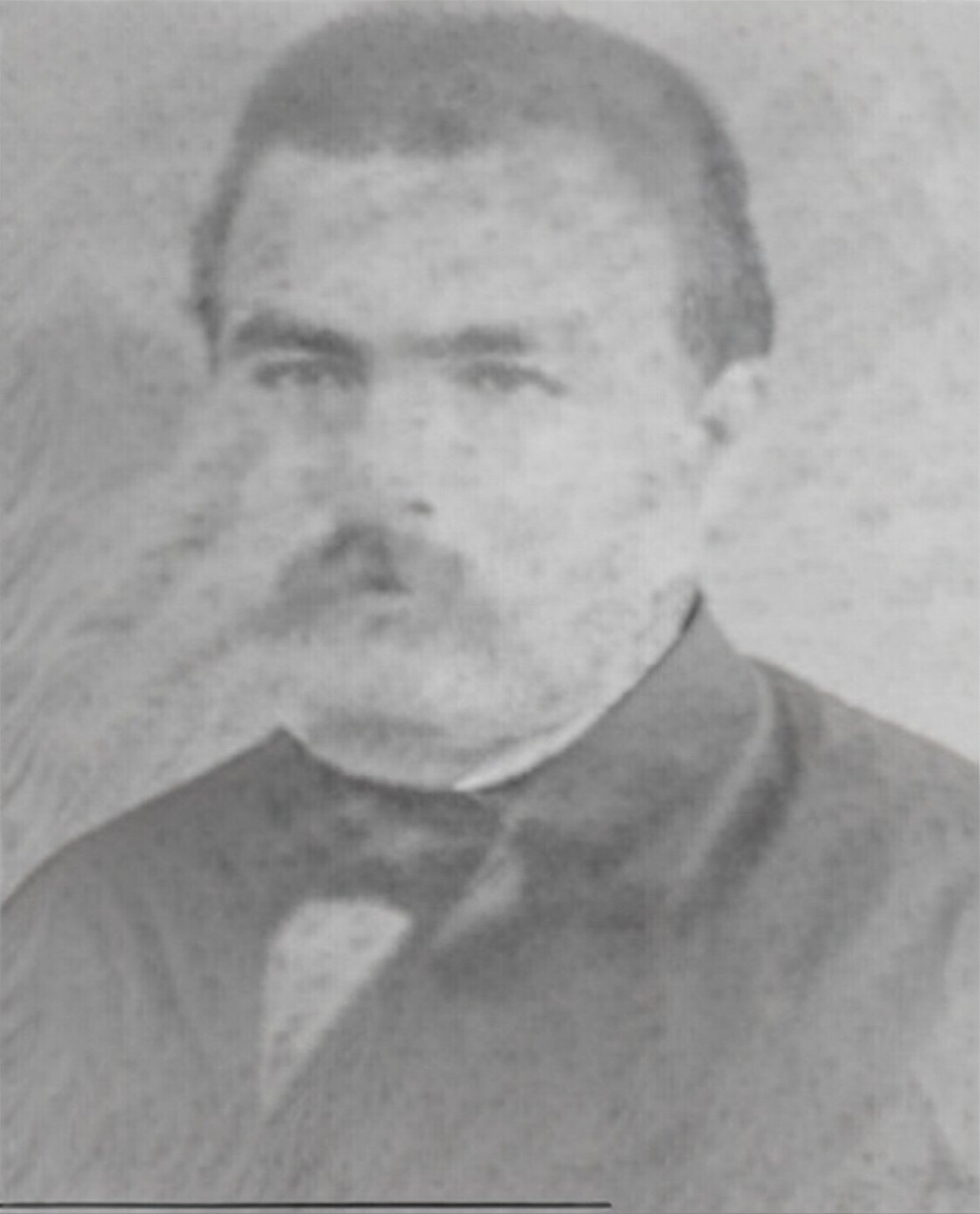
Raymundo Cámara (1850 - 1919), an influential landowner and industrialist.

In 1910, Francisco I. Madero, a wealthy landowner from the northern state of Coahuila, spearheaded a democratic movement known as Maderism, aimed at overthrowing the Díaz dictatorship. This revolution garnered support from numerous Yucatecan landowners who had been threatened by Olegario Molina. Following the 1910 revolution led by Francisco I. Madero and the ascent of José María Pino Suárez to the governorship of Yucatán in 1911, the relationship between these landowners and the government underwent a significant transformation. However, Pino Suarez's term was short-lived as he resigned from his position to assume the role of Vice-President of Mexico. His brother-in-law, Nicolás Cámara Vales, succeeded him as Governor. Both men maintained close ties to the traditional landowning families.

“It is important to remember that during that time, the influential large landowners who had been part of the old regime and supported the traditional oligarchic system still held significant power. Some of these landowners had ties with the leaders of local Maderism, albeit with more moderate and conservative positions compared to other regions of Mexico. Notably, María Cámara Vales, the wife of Pino Suárez, belonged to a prominent landowning family that maintained a close relationship with the old regime. Her parents, Raymundo Cámara Luján and Carmen Vales Castillo, possessed ample economic resources. In fact, María's brother, Nicolás Cámara Vales, would serve as the Governor of the state just a year later.”

During his governorship, Nicolás Cámara Vales established the Henequen Market Regulatory Commission in 1912. This initiative aimed to regulate prices and increase market access for landowners, thereby curbing the monopolistic power sought by the International Harvester. However, in February 1913, the Madero government was overthrown during the Ten Tragic Days, a military coup. Governor Cámara Vales was forced to resign by the new military dictatorship led by General Victoriano Huerta. In 1915, following the collapse of the Huerta regime, Venustiano Carranza, a revolutionary politician, assumed the presidency of Mexico. Shortly after taking office, Carranza dispatched General Salvador Alvarado to Mérida with the aim of promoting the socialist ideals of the Mexican Revolution in the Yucatán peninsula. Geographically isolated from the rest of the country, the Yucatán peninsula had managed to remain relatively unaffected by the radicalism of the revolution until then. Both Molina and Pino Suárez, adhering to the liberal traditions of the nineteenth century, held a disdain for socialism. However, with the arrival of Alvarado in 1915, the wave of socialism could no longer be avoided in Yucatán, and it came to dominate Mexican politics until the 1980s when neoliberal reforms began to be implemented.

"Before the Revolution arrived in Yucatan, a small number of people had economic control over the region in combination with the foreign trusts. Their agent, Avelino Montes, a Spaniard, was the son-in-law and partner of Olegario Molina, the true master of the Yucatan, in collusion with a few large landowners. That group led by Montes dominated the government, the banks, the railroads, education, charity, the church, and even high-society parties. Anyone who did not belong to the CASTE was condemned to be excluded from everything. Not even a leaf falls without the permission of the CASTE. The Creel-Terrazas family, in comparison, were nothing but poor apprentices, who should have traveled to Yucatan to receive lessons... In exchange for the unconditional support and the money they offered to all governments, the landowners only demanded the protection and intervention of the authorities. to conserve the odious servitude of the Yucatan haciendas [...] REACTIONARIES, PRIVILEGED CASTE and DIVINE CASTE (Salvador Alvarado used capital letters to refer to that group throughout the quoted text) were the epithets that the Sinaloan General applied to the members of the tight henequen elite that controlled Yucatecan society, whose destruction had become a strategic objective for the constitutionalist General."

General Alvarado tried to end the ascendancy of the divine caste over politics, economy, and society. The most exclusive club associated with the Yucatecan elite was "La Lonja Meridiana", known for catering exclusively to its criollo members and guests. However, there was a significant event that challenged the exclusivity of La Lonja Meridiana and signaled a shift in power dynamics. In March 1916, during a memorable evening, the normally opulent halls of La Lonja Meridana saw the presence and participation of mestizos, who were of mixed Indigenous and European heritage. This unexpected presence and participation of mestizos can be seen as a metaphorical triumph of the mestizo people over the prevailing oligarchy and a sign of changing times under the Mexican Revolution:

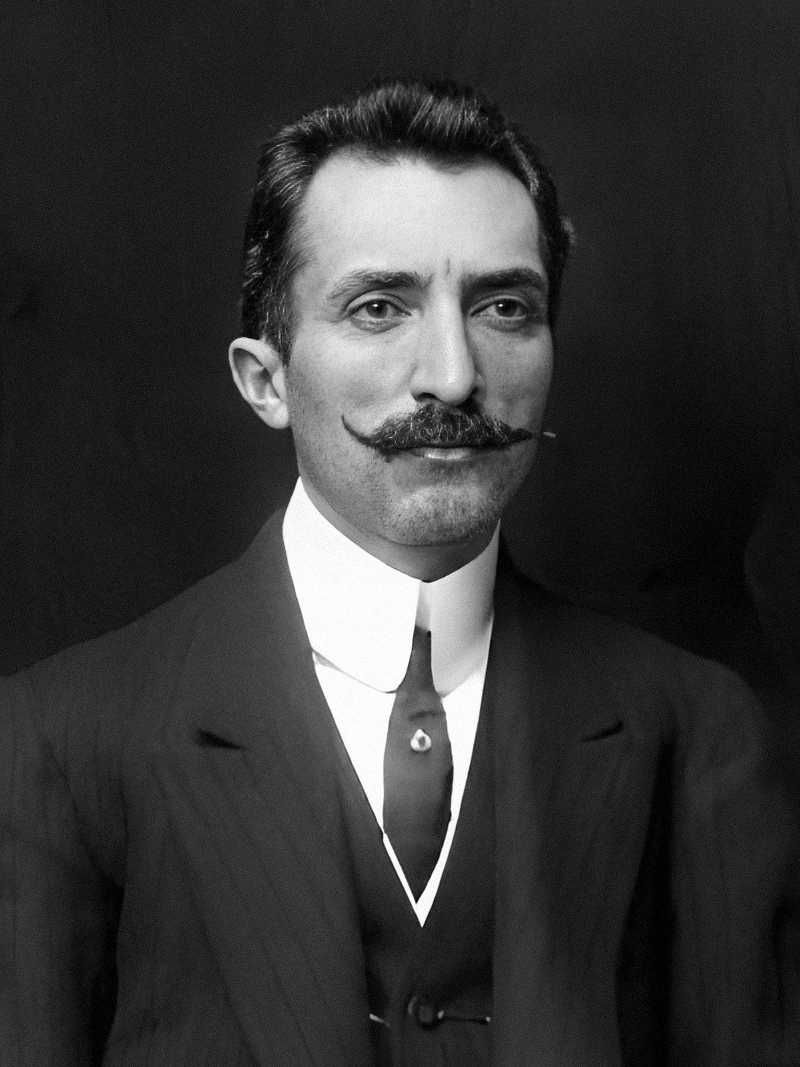
José María Pino Suárez, Governor of Yucatán (1911)

“Bringing together the crème de la crème of Merida's society, these exclusive clubs were renowned for their extravagant and opulent activities. Accessible only to their members and guests, who were exclusively white (criollo), they presented a stark contrast to the ordinary mestizo people observing from the streets below. However, during one memorable evening in March 1916, the resplendent halls of La Lonja Meridana resounded not only with the familiar strains of Quadrilles, Waltzes, Mazurkas, and danzones, but also with the rhythmic footsteps of the mestizos on the marble floors. The French mirrors, usually reflecting the opulent attire and jewelry imported from Paris, now showcased the intricate suits and rosaries of the mestizas. General Alvarado must have surely relished this metaphorical triumph of the mestizo people over the prevailing oligarchy, while members of La Lonja Meridiana must have witnessed it with profound horror, realizing it as an unequivocal sign of the changing times under the Revolution."

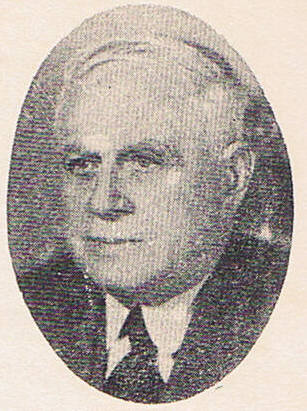
Nicolás Cámara Vales, Governor of Yucatán (1911 - 1913)

During the 1930s, Lázaro Cárdenas, the socialist President of Mexico, implemented the expropriation of the Haciendas of Yucatán. The Haciendas ceased to exist, becoming ejidos, autonomous collective units with communal land ownership rights. This action effectively broke the iron grip that the divine caste once held on the region.

Following the Mexican Revolution, the descendants of the divine caste largely withdrew from frontline politics but continued to discreetly participate in other spheres of public life, such as business and diplomacy. Similar to the wealthy industrialists in Monterrey, it is believed that the descendants of the Yucatecan oligarchy played a role in the establishment and growth of the center-right National Action Party (PAN). In 2001, after almost 90 years of Revolutionary governments, Patricio Patrón Laviada, a PAN politician and descendant of two prominent families associated with the divine caste, assumed the Governorship of Yucatán. A similar narrative can be observed with Carlos Castillo Peraza, a Yucatecan intellectual who played a key role in shaping the ideology of the PAN party.

A recent study, published in 2018, highlights how descendants of the divine caste maintain their influence in social circles. Magazine photographers and bouncers are reportedly instructed to select specific individuals, preferably descendants of influential families like the Cámara family, to photograph or to give preferential admission to exclusive nightclubs. This practice reflects the perpetuation of a social hierarchy based on wealth and status, where individuals from certain families are considered "opinion leaders" and set the standard for others to emulate:

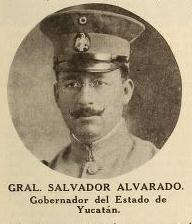
Salvador Alvarado, Governor of Yucatán (1915 - 1918)

"...we had to look for the people they call 'opinion leaders.' That's the concept they work with [...] They are well-known people, attractive and wealthy. The idea was this: if you see Juan Cámara drinking a bottle of José Cuervo, you should think, 'I want to be like Juan Cámara, so I'm going to drink José Cuervo to be like him.'"

== In popular culture ==
The Divine Caste is a 1977 Mexican historical drama film directed by Julián Pastor and starring Ignacio López Tarso, Ana Luisa Peluffo and Pedro Armendáriz Jr. The film is set in Yucatán around the time of the Mexican Revolution and portrays the social upheaval following General Salvador Alvarado's arrival in the area.
