= Olegario Molina =

Mexican politician, governor of Yucatán from 1902 to 1907

Olegario Molina Solís
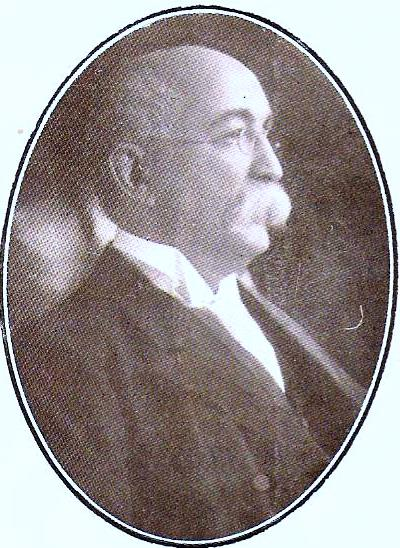
- Olegario Molina in 1909

Secretary of development, colonization and industry
- In office 21 March 1907 – 24 March 1911
- President: Porfirio Díaz
- Preceded by: Blas Escontría y Bustamante
- Succeeded by: Manuel Marroquín y Rivera

Governor of Yucatán
- In office 1 February 1902 – 27 March 1907
- Preceded by: Francisco Cantón Rosado
- Succeeded by: Enrique Muñoz Arístegui

Personal details
- Born: March 6, 1843 Bolonchén, Yucatán (now Campeche)
- Died: April 28, 1925 (aged 82) Havana, Cuba
- Spouse: Dolores Figueroa y Milán (m. 1866; died 1914)
- Children: 6

Olegario Molina Solís (6 March 1843 – 28 April 1925) was a Mexican lawyer, businessman and politician who served as the governor of Yucatán from 1902 to 1907 and the secretary of development, colonization and industry in the government of Porfirio Díaz from 1907 to 1911. He was also a member of the Chamber of Deputies in two terms.

Born in Bolonchén, in what is now the state of Campeche, Molina and his family moved to Hecelchakán in the state of Yucatán in his youth. He studied law, becoming a lawyer. He was elected unopposed as the governor of the state in 1901, being reelected in 1906. During his governorship, he implemented many sanitary reforms and began bringing the Maya population into the state's education system. Molina also developed the state's henequen industry, being a member of the state's henequen oligarchy.

In 1907, Molina was appointed as the secretary of development by President Díaz. In this role, he made a failed attempt to regulate the country's mining sector, and supported the forced deportations of Sonora's Yaqui population to perform forced labor in Yucatán. He resigned during the Mexican Revolution in 1911, going into exile in Cuba later in the decade. He died in the 1920s, having never returned to Mexico.

== Ancestry ==
The Molina family was Spanish in origin, having immigrated to Mexico in the eighteenth century. Molina's paternal grandparents were Julián Molina y Bastante and Paula Esquivel del Granado, while his maternal grandparents were Felipe de Solís Lara and Rosalía Rosales Valdés. Julián was the son of José Molina and María Bastante y García Rejón. José Molina and his brother Juan migrated from Guatemala to what is now the state of Campeche.

Julián attempted to cultivate tobacco outside of Valladolid. When that failed, he moved his family to Bolonchén. There, he prospered, and supported the Spanish Constitution of 1812 when it was promulgated, and was then elected president of the local ayuntamiento under its provisions. When Ferdinand VII annulled this constitution, Julián refused to comply and was arrested, being released in 1817. He continued to support Mexican independence, and then retired to private life when that was accomplished. Also in Bolonchén, his son Juan Francisco expanded their tobacco farm and opened a store, marrying into the prominent Solís Rosales family.

== Early life ==
Olegario Molina Solís was born in Bolonchén, Campeche, on 6 March 1843. At the time of his birth, it was an integral part of the state of Yucatán. His parents were Juan Francisco Molina y Esquivel and Cecilia Solís Rosales, who married in 1835. Molina had nine siblings: Ricardo (born 1840), José María (born 1844), José Trinidad (born 1846), Pastor (born 1846), Augusto (born 1847), Juan Francisco (born 1850), Audomaro (born 1852), Manuel, and Casiana, the latter of whom died at birth. Audomaro Molina Solís was a notable journalist and Juan Francisco Molina Solís was a prominent historian.

In 1847, Molina y Esquivel fought in the Caste War of Yucatán, and when he returned he found that Maya rebels razed the family store and the Molina-Rosales estate. As a result, in 1850, he moved the family to Hecelchakán and rebuilt their fortune. At the age of five, due to a maid giving him the wrong medicine, Molina lost his left eye. Due to this, during his primary education, his mother read his lessons to him. In 1857, a Campeche successionist movement broke out, which the Molinas opposed, leading to successionists raiding their estate and the family fleeing to Mérida back in Yucatán.

In Mérida, Molina studied philosophy at the Seminario Conciliar de San Ildefonso. His family's poverty meant that he had to work while continuing his studies. He worked as a clerk for the hospital San Juan de Díos, where he befriended a foreign priest who taught him French and English. He later attended the state law school, where he received his degree in 1866.

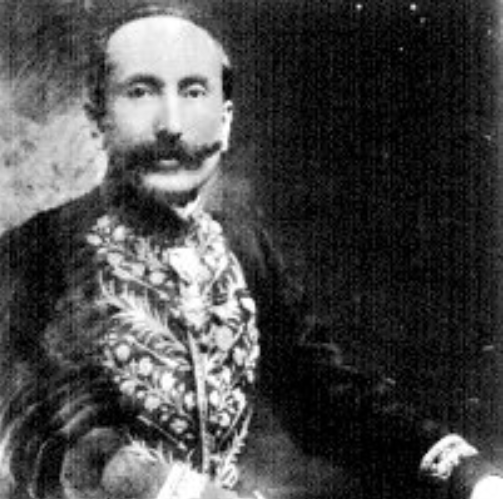
Molina, c. 1885

The same year that Molina received his degree, he joined the side of the Liberals during the second French intervention in Mexico, who sought to drive the forces of Maximilian von Habsburg out of the Yucatán Peninsula. Joining the war three months before the fighting ended in the area, Molina was made the secretary of the general Manuel Cepeda Peraza. After the Liberals won, Cepeda Peraza rewarded Molina by giving him and some of his brothers positions in the new government. Molina became head of the Instituto Literario (Literary Institute), simultaneously gaining a degree in topographical engineering.

Molina married Dolores Figueroa y Milán in 1866, and she died in 1914. They had six children: Olegario, who died young, María, Teresa, Dolores, Luis Augusto, and Carmela.

== Governorship ==
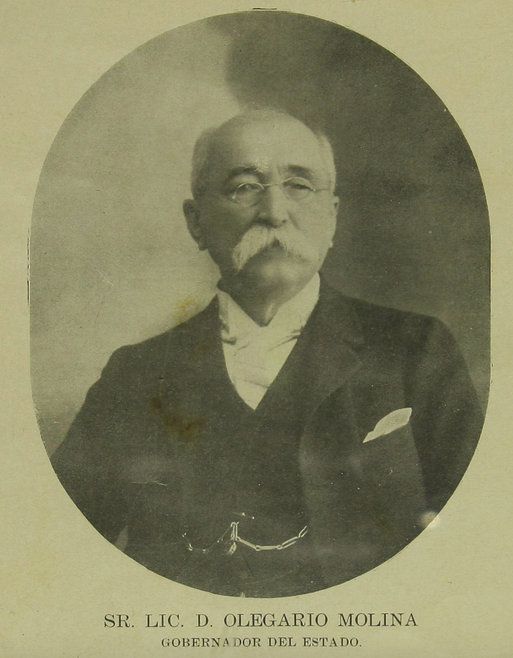
Photograph of Molina during his governorship in 1906

On 9 July 1901, the Central Club (Spanish: Club Central) was formed in Mérida to support Molina's candidacy for the governorship of Yucatán. Molina ran as the only candidate that year. Molina took office on 1 February 1902, succeeding Francisco Cantón Rosado. Yucatán's previous two governments had been liberal and then conservative. Molina's government represented a break from this revolving ideological trend, instead being "scientific", moderate, and influenced by positivism. This trend followed the Porfirian line and would be Yucatán's government until the end of the Porfiriato. The Catholic Church viewed Molina's government as the best way to prevent Yucatán's anticlerical faction from returning to power. During his governorship, the Church's religious infrastructure was strengthened, with more Catholic churches and schools being built.

In the first week of his governorship, Molina gave up his salary, instead directing it to fund the construction of Yucatán's general hospital, later known as "Agustín O'Horán" hospital. It would take almost the entirety of his term to complete. During the final year of the project, he worked with the businessman Enrique Muñoz Arístegui, who would become a political collaborator. Molina's administration also saw increased sanitary reform in Mérida, which had previously been struck by epidemic diseases. Education was also a priority for Molina's government, as the elite businessmen, intellectuals and politicians of the positivist regime wished to bring "civilization" to Yucatán's indigenous Maya population, many of whom lived in semi-independent areas in the state's east and south. Molina declared to Yucatán's legislature in 1906 that the role of the state was to:

[...] Ensure that instruction spreads to the remote regions; avoid its confinement in the main areas; generalize the conviction that instruction is the most desirable good and that it is the capital duty of every citizen to contribute to the penetration of the popular masses.

(Spanish: [...] Preocupar que la instrucción se difunda hasta las regiones apartadas; evitar su confinamiento en los centros principales; generalizar el convencimineto de que la instrucción es el bien más apetecible y que es deber capital de todo ciudadano contribuir a que compenetre en las mases populares.)

In the second half of the eighteenth century, international demand for fibers rose, and henequen became Yucatán's chief export. Henequen exports increased from 40,000 bales to 600,000 bales during the Porfiriato, and gave power to a small hacienda-residing class (Spanish: hacendados) numbering c. 300-400 people. Molina was the most conspicuous character of the so-called Divine Caste, a term used by General Salvador Alvarado to designate the Yucatecan oligarchy of the early twentieth century or, more precisely, the group of hacendados henequeneros, or porfiriato henequenero, who controlled the state economy of Yucatán at that time. According to the American journalist John Kenneth Turner, Molina's land holdings in Yucatán and Quintana Roo amounted to 15,000,000 acres, or 23,000 square miles. In October 1902, Molina's exporting house (Spanish: casa exportadora), Molina y Compañía, signed a secret contract with International Harvester sought to eliminate competitors and force the price of fiber down.

From July to October 1903, Molina's brother Manuel Molina Solís served as interim governor while he was out of the state on vacation. On 1 February 1906, Molina was elected to a second term. His reelection sparked controversy in Yucatán society, with many calling for the establishment of a true democracy and a change in power, both in the state and the rest of the country. Molina was again absent from 16 April to 6 December 1906, during which Muñoz Arístegui served as interim governor.

From 5 February to 9 February 1906, President Porfirio Díaz, accompanied by, among others, his wife, Vice President Ramón Corral, and foreign ambassadors, visited the state. This was the first time that Mexico's federal government set foot on the Yucatán Peninsula. Díaz inaugurated several projects, including the O'Horán hospital. The visit convinced Díaz that Molina would be a good member of his cabinet. Muñoz Arístegui was to finish the remainder of Molina's second term.

== Secretary of development ==
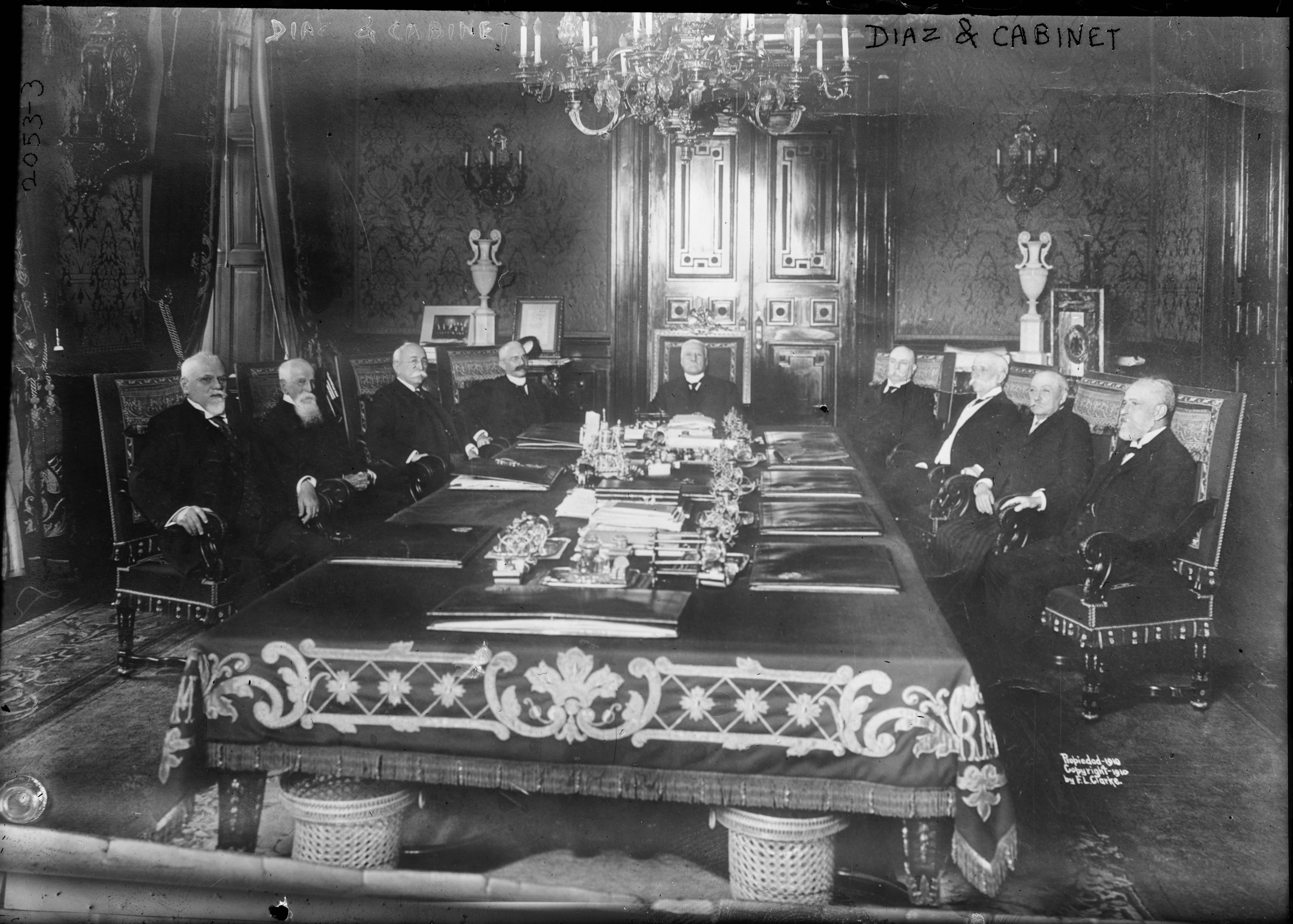
Molina (third from the left) with Porfirio Díaz (center) and his cabinet, known as the Científicos, c. the 1900s.

On 21 March 1907, Molina was made secretary of development, colonization and industry by President Díaz. The previous officeholder, Blas Escontría y Bustamante, died in 1906. Molina moved his residency to Mexico City, and became a member of the Científicos ("Scientists"), technocratic members of Díaz's circle. Molina particularly got along well with the finance minister, José Yves Limantour, who was considered the head of the group. Molina, as the secretary of development, issued his first government circular in February 1908 to prepare Mexico's states for the upcoming 1910 census. The results of the census were published on 27 October 1910.

In 1907, Molina proposed a mining law (Spanish: ley minería) that would grant the Mexican government greater regulatory oversight of Mexico's mining industry. Two articles of legislation were criticized by foreign investors, as they prevented them from buying lands near the border and stated that all mining activities be carried out by companies incorporated in Mexico. In June 1908, Daniel Guggenheim, the president of the ASARCO mining company, wrote to Díaz that the new law would chase away foreign investment and make it impossible to continue investing more capital in the future. On behalf of Díaz, Molina responded:

In any country, the law is not the one that must be accommodated, to the needs of the capital that seeks investments, to the contrary, the capitalist must submit to the law of the country in which he invests, attracted by the benefits and gain that the investment of his capital offers him.

(Spanish: En cualquier país, la ley no es que se debe acomodar a las necesidades del capital que busca inversiones, al contrario, el capitalista debe someterse a la ley del país en que él invierte, atraído por los beneficios y ganancias que la inversión de su capital le ofrece.)

The government was split on the issue, with Molina and the Secretary of Finance José Yves Limantour being in favor of better regulations, while Vice President Corral argued that maintaining American investment was more important, given that European investment was difficult to attract. Díaz opted to remove the most controversial articles of the law so as to avoid antagonizing American business leaders, who had some influence in Washington, D.C.

During the 1900s, Mexico's agricultural sector faced various crises. There were pest outbreaks of boll weevils which affected commercial monocultural zones, as well as droughts in 1907 and 1908. To promote national agriculture, Molina launched a series of initiatives between 1907 and 1910.

From its predecessors, the Díaz administration inherited resistance by the indigenous Yaqui people of the state of Sonora. They had long resisted colonization of the Yaqui Valley, and the ineffectiveness of the state government and the group's ability to side with multiple factions led to them having de facto autonomy. By the 1880s, the Porfirian government had taken control of the state, with them viewing the Yaquis their last anti-progressive obstacle. With the defeat of the Yaqui leader Cajemé, the group suffered from disunity and many surrendered. Many Yaquis left the valley, but guerilla resistance continued under Tetabiate. From 1904 to 1907, the government increased persecution, with an increase in large-scale arrests, the execution or imprisonment of some, and the deportation of others to other parts of the country to work. The bulk of the deportations were to the henequen plantations of Yucatán, which Molina played a major role in. He also used his secretaryship to give generous contracts in the Yaqui Valley to groups such as the Richardson Construction Company of Los Angeles.

== Later life ==
Due to public opposition that began the Mexican Revolution, all of Díaz's cabinet except for two ministers (José Yves Limantour and Manuel González de Cosío) resigned on 24 March 1911, including Molina. His successor, Manuel Marroquín y Rivera, was announced on 28 March along with Díaz's new cabinet. Díaz would ultimately resign himself in May. After Molina's resignation, he retired to Mérida back in Yucatán. He lived there until his wife died in 1914. Due to pressure from revolutionaries, Molina and his doctor Rafael Betancourt fled to Paris that year.

Molina then traveled from Europe to Havana, Cuba, to meet his daughter María, son-in-law Avelino Montes, and granddaughter Obdulia. He was convinced by Montes, as well as his daughter Carmela and son-in-law Luis Carranza, to live with them in Havana. Another son-in-law, Rogelio Suárez, stayed in Mérida under protection from Spain, and informed Molina that several of his haciendas had been seized by Mexico's revolutionary government.

== Death and legacy ==
Molina died in exile in Havana on 28 April 1925. His remains were later transferred, after a tribute in the Teatro Peón Contreras to the chapel of the Sodzil hacienda, which was previously his property. Following the ascent of socialist Salvador Alvarado to the governorship of Yucatán in 1915, the alliance between the henequen oligarchy and International Harvester established by Molina began to be rolled back. However, at the time of his death, Molina was still one of the wealthiest entrepreneurs in Yucatán, which historian Allen Wells viewed as showcasing the Revolution's goal of agrarian reform falling short in the state. Most of the wealthy henequeneros worked with Alvarado and supported his policies, with Molina having been one of the few who left the state.
