= Juan Pío Pérez =

Mexican philologist (1798–1859)

Juan Pío Pérez Bermón
- Born: 1798; Mérida, Yucatán
- Died: 1859 (aged 60–61); Mérida, Yucatán
- Education: Colegio de San Ildefonso

Juan Pío Pérez Bermón (1798–1859) was a Mexican intellectual, philologist, researcher of Maya culture and mayor of the city of Mérida from 1848 to 1853. Pío Pérez studied Maya civilization in the Yucatán Peninsula. His most significant contributions to the field was his Dictionary of the Mayan Language and interpretations of various fragments of the Chilam Balam.

== Life ==
Pío Pérez was born in 1798 and attended the Colegio de San Ildefonso. He was from a Maya-speaking family although they were of Spanish descent. He worked as an interpreter for the New Spanish government before the Mexican War of Independence. Pío Pérez worked many government positions throughout his life, including as mayor of the city of Mérida. He died in 1859.

== Contributions ==
While working as an authority for the government in Maní, Pío Pérez encountered 16th century records in the town archive. These and other archival materials he encountered were used for his interpretation of the Mayan calendar system.

After translating and interpreting many materials, Pío Pérez passed them along to John Lloyd Stephens. Stephens, an American explorer and travel writer, published sections of Pío Pérez's work in his Incidents of Travel in Yucatán from 1843. Some collections of Pío Pérez's works are referred to as the “Codex Perez”
