= Bolonchén, Campeche =

Bolonchén
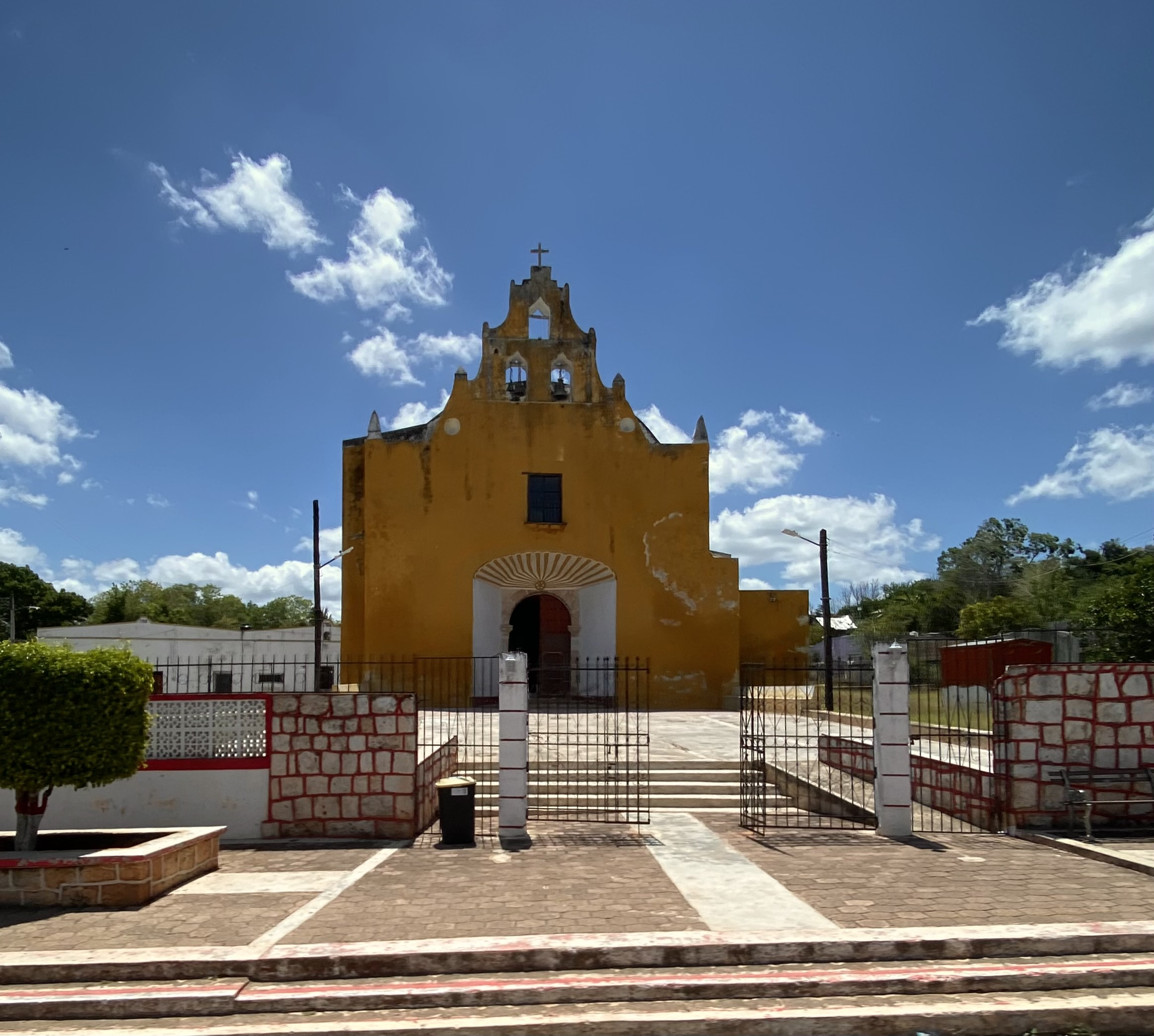
- Parroquia De Nuestra Señora de la Asuncion, Bolonchén, Campeche, 2021

- Location in Mexico Bolonchén (Mexico)
- Coordinates: 20°00′15″N 89°51′34″W
- Country: Mexico
- State: Campeche
- Municipality: Hopelchén
- Elevation: 159 m (522 ft)

Population (2010)
  - City: 3,975
  - Urban: 3,975

Bolonchén or Bolonchén de Rejón (Bolon Che'e'en in Modern Maya) is a town in the Mexican state of Campeche, about 120 km (75 mi) east from the state capital, Campeche, in Hopelchén Municipality. As of 2010 the town had a population of 3,975 people. A short distance to the south of Bolonchén are located the caves of Xtacunbilxunan.

== Etymology ==
The name "Bolonchén" means "Nine Wells" in the Maya language, and "de Rejón" commemorates Manuel Crescencio Rejón, a lawyer who helped draft the 1917 Constitution and who was born here. Previously, the Pueblo was named Bolonchenticul. It was renamed in September 1955 to Balonchén de Rejón . It is also the birthplace of Olegario Molina y Solis, the Governor of Yucatán and Minister de Fomento in the Porfirio Díaz era (1877–1911). In 1833, it was the only pueblo to escape the cholera epidemic. This was due to the efforts of Julian Molina y Bastante (Olegario's grandfather) and the brothers Martinez.

== Ruins ==
The large Bolonchén ruins site of ancient Maya architecture is located just north of the modern town. It dates from the Mayan Classic Period and Post Classic Period. Most of the carved stone facades of the ancient structures were removed in the 18th through mid−20th centuries for reuse in new construction work. Nonetheless, a few monuments with sculpture and hieroglyphic texts are still visible.

Both the ruins and cave were visited and described briefly by John Lloyd Stephens at the start of the 1840s, but no detailed scholarly examination of the ruins was made until Eric von Euw in 1973 (in part because Stephens and other early visitors failed to note that there were surviving inscriptions).

== Climate ==
Climate data for Bolonchén de Rejón
Month	Jan	Feb	Mar	Apr	May	Jun	Jul	Aug	Sep	Oct	Nov	Dec	Year
Mean daily maximum °C (°F)	29.3 (84.7)	31.3 (88.3)	33.6 (92.5)	35.6 (96.1)	36 (97)	34.5 (94.1)	33.8 (92.8)	34.1 (93.4)	33.3 (91.9)	31.8 (89.2)	30.4 (86.7)	29.2 (84.6)	33 (91)
Mean daily minimum °C (°F)	16.6 (61.9)	17.5 (63.5)	19.2 (66.6)	20.9 (69.6)	22.0 (71.6)	22.4 (72.3)	21.6 (70.9)	21.7 (71.1)	21.8 (71.2)	20.6 (69.1)	18.7 (65.7)	17.1 (62.8)	20 (68)
Average precipitation mm (inches)	30 (1.2)	23 (0.9)	20 (0.8)	30 (1.2)	76 (3)	160 (6.2)	140 (5.5)	160 (6.4)	200 (7.7)	110 (4.2)	43 (1.7)	33 (1.3)	1,000 (40)
Source: Weatherbase
