= Enrique Muñoz Arístegui =

Mexican industrialist and politician

Enrique Muñoz Arístegui (1856–1936) was a Mexican industrialist and politician. He lived in Mérida, Yucatán. He was three times the governor of Yucatán, in 1906, in 1907 to 1909 and then from 1910 to 1911.
