= List of haciendas of Yucatán =

This is a list of haciendas of Yucatán.

== B ==
- Hacienda Blanca Flor
- Hacienda Bucalemu

== C ==
- Hacienda Cacao
- Hacienda Chenché de las Torres
- Hacienda Chenkú
- Hacienda Chichén
- Hacienda Chichí de los Lagos
- Hacienda Chichí Suárez
- Hacienda Citincabchén
- Hacienda Chunchucmil No separate article on the Spanish site. It is included as a section in both articles Chunchucmil (sitio arqueológico) and Chunchucmil
- Hacienda Cuca (es)
- Hacienda Chochoh (es)
- Hacienda Cocoyoc

== D ==
- Hacienda Dzibikak
- Hacienda Dzoyolá

== E ==
- Hacienda Eknakán

== I ==
- Hacienda Itzincab Cámara has links to Lauburu There is an English page but no links to the haciendas mentioned on the Spanish page.

== J ==
- Haciendas Jardins de Merida

== K ==
- Hacienda Kancabchén
- Hacienda Kancabchén (Halachó)
- Hacienda Kancabchén (Homún)
- Hacienda Kancabchén (Motul)
- Hacienda Kancabchén (Tunkás)
- Hacienda Kancabchén Ucí
- Hacienda Kancabchén de Valencia
- Hacienda Kankabchén (Seyé)
- Hacienda Kankabchén (Tixkokob)
- Hacienda Katanchel
- Hacienda Kochol

== L ==
- Hacienda Lepan (es)

== M ==
- Haciendas de Michoacán
- Hacienda Mozanga
- Hacienda Mulchechén (es)
- Hacienda Misné (es)
- Hacienda Misnebalam (es)
- Hacienda Mucuyché
- Maxcanú Municipality:

- Hacienda Ché
- Hacienda Canzote
- Hacienda Crucero Copop
- Haciendas Memu y Xamail
- Hacienda Simón
- Hacienda Xlam Riti

== N ==
- Hacienda Nuestra Señora de la Soledad Pebá

== O ==
- Hacienda Oxtapacab (es)

== P ==
- Hacienda de Peñalolén
- Hacienda Petcanche (es)
- Hacienda Petectunich (es)
- Hacienda Poxilá (es)
- Poccheiná

== S ==
- Hacienda Sahé (es)
- Hacienda Sac Chich (aka San Antonio Sac Chich) (es)
- Hacienda San Antonio Chalante, there is an article on the village, makes no mention of the hacienda (es)
- Hacienda San Antonio Chel (es)
- Hacienda San Antonio Cucul (es)
- Hacienda San Antonio Kaua (es)
- Hacienda San Antonio Millet (es)
- Hacienda San Antonio Tahdzibichén, mentioned in a subcategory of the subcommissary Tahdzibichén (Mérida)
- Hacienda San Antonio Tehuitz (es)
- Hacienda San Bernardo (es)
- Hacienda San Diego Azcorra (es)
- Hacienda San Diego Tixcacal
- Hacienda San Ildefonso Teya (aka Hacienda Teya)
- Hacienda San Ignacio (es)
- Hacienda San José Chactún
- Hacienda San José Chakán, (es)
- Hacienda San José Cholul (es)
- Hacienda de San Juan Bautista Tabi, no article, but mentions the hacienda here Oxkutzcab
- Hacienda San Juan Dzonot (es)
- Hacienda San Lorenzo de Aké, this appears to be on the Mayan site, but talks briefly about the hacienda and has photos Aké
- Hacienda de San Mateo de la Zarca
- Hacienda San Miguel, there is nothing about this place on the Spanish site. There is one that is not on this list that I will add immediately below, clearly a different place from photos and location.
- Hacienda San Miguel Chac (aka Hacienda Chac) (es)
- Hacienda San Nicolás Dzoyaxché (es)
- Hacienda San Pedro Chimay (es)
- Hacienda San Pedro Chukuaxín (es)
- Hacienda San Pedro Noh Pat (aka Hacienda San Pedro Nohpat) (es)
- Hacienda San Pedro Ochil (es)
- Hacienda San Pedro Palomeque (es)
- Hacienda de San Pedro Tenexac
- Hacienda de Santa Anna Aragón
- Hacienda Santa Cruz (Tixkokob) (es)
- Hacienda Santa Cruz Palomeque (es)
- Hacienda Santa María Acú, village (no reference to hacienda) (es)
- Hacienda Santa Rosa de Lima
- Hacienda Santo Domingo
- Hacienda Sotuta de Peón (es)
- Hacienda Suytunchén (Mérida) (es)
- Hacienda Suytunchén (Tecoh) (es)
- Hacienda San Diego Cutz

== T ==
- Hacienda Tabi (es)
- Hacienda Tamanché (es)
- Hacienda Tanil (es)
- Hacienda Tanlum (es)
- Hacienda Techoh (es)
- Hacienda Tekit de Regil (es)
- Hacienda Temozón
- Hacienda Temozón Sur (es)
- Hacienda Tepich another name same, I think. The one on my list says it is near Acanceh 12 km from Mérida. Spanish wiki has a similar name also near Acanceh, but 22 km from Mérida and photos do not appear to be same architectural style? See below for the one from Spanish wiki:
- Hacienda Tepich Carrillo (es)
- Hacienda Thoho-Ku
- Hacienda Ticopó (es)
- Hacienda Ticum

== U ==
- Hacienda Uayalceh (es)
- Hacienda Uayamón
- Hacienda de Uluapa

== V ==
- Hacienda Xcanatún (es)

== X ==
- Hacienda Xcanchakán (aka Hacienda X-Kanchakán) (es)
- Hacienda Xcumpich (es)
- Hacienda Xcunya, is showing in a section on the village page (es)
- Hacienda Xmatkuil
- Hacienda Xtepén, is showing in a section on the village page (es)

== Y ==
- Hacienda Yaxcopoil
- Hacienda Yaxnic (es)
- Hacienda Yucatán Palace (Yucatán Palacio? Palacio de Yucatán?)
- Hacienda Yunkú, there is a page on the village, nothing of the hacienda (es)
