= Henequen industry in Yucatán =

Henequen farm in the Yucatán Peninsula

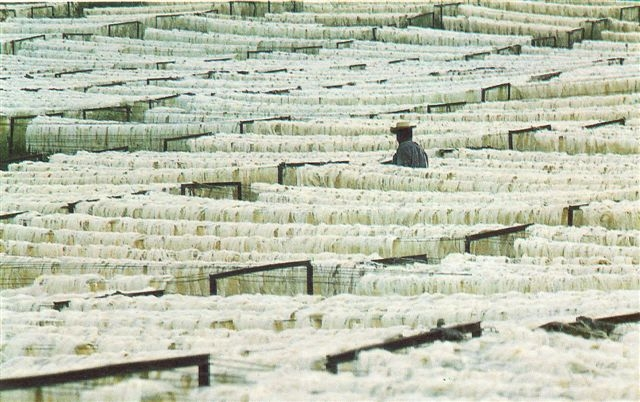
Henequén drying in the sun

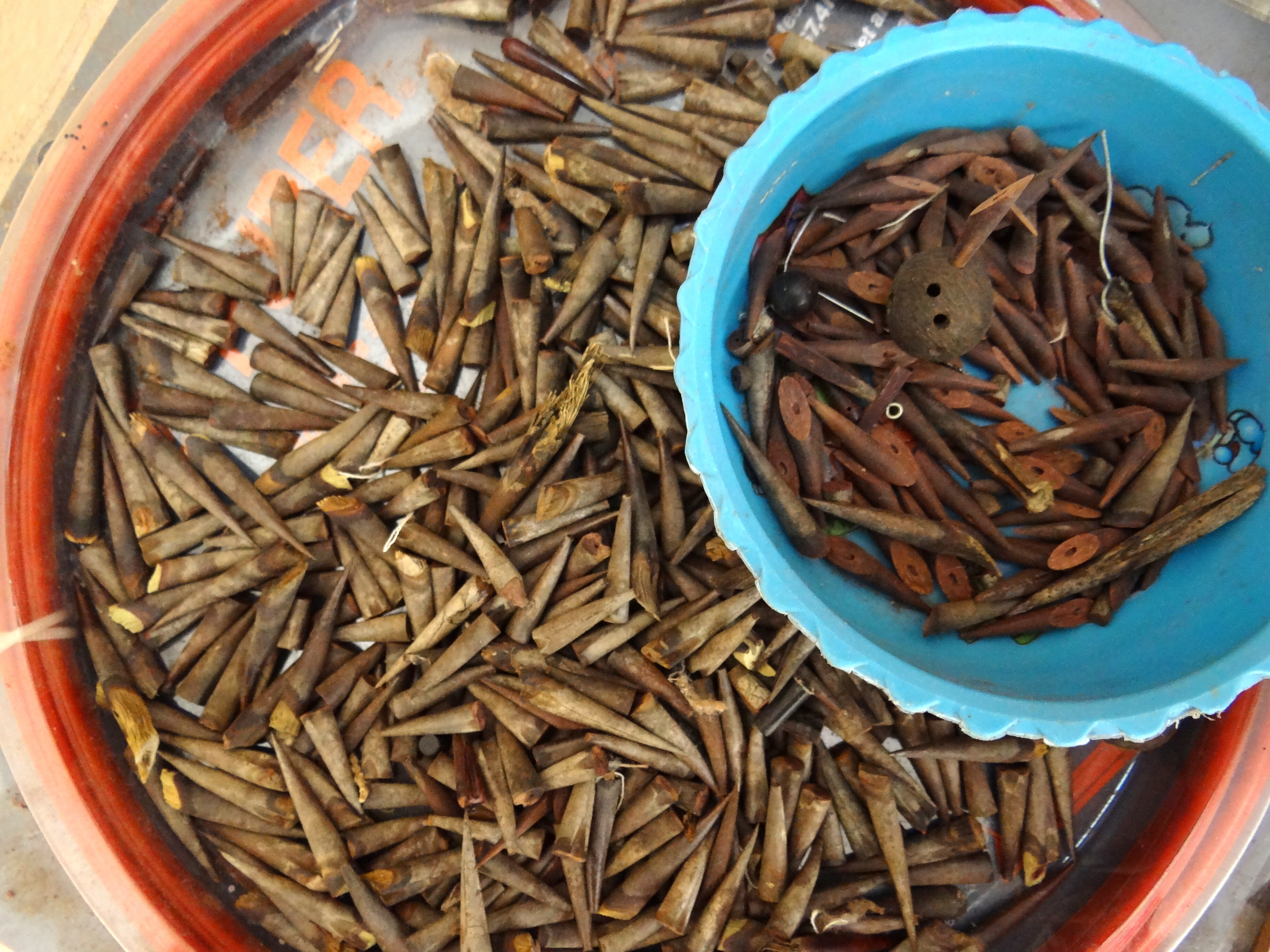
Henequen spines for jewelry in Mérida

The Henequen industry in Yucatán is an agribusiness of a plant native to Yucatán, Mexico. After extraction from the plant, henequen is processed as a textile in various forms to obtain a range of products for domestic, commercial, agricultural and industrial use. It was exported to America as binder twine for crops in large quantities, and worldwide as rope for mooring ships, cloth for sacks, and other uses. It was a major regional industry from the time of the Maya civilization until the mid 20th century. The invention of synthetic fibers and the manufacturing of substitute products from these displaced henequen and sisal fibers and led to the decline of the industry over the course of the 20th century.

In addition to its fiber, the juice extracted from the henequen plant can be made into a liquor similar to tequila. Certain steroidal chemicals used in the pharmaceutical industry are also derived from its juice.

== Etymology ==
The English term agave was known in the Mayan languages as ki. Henequen (Agave fourcroydes) was referred to as henequen blanco by the Spaniards and sakki by the Mayan, while sisal (Agave sisalana,) was henequen verde to the Spaniards and yaxqui to the Maya.

== Land preparation in the 19th century ==
Fires are common in the Yucatán just before the rainy season, after the harsh tropical sun has dried out the vegetation. When tropical rains set in, the ash dissolves into the soil, fertilizing it and conditioning for the growth of henequen. When the next season begins, sometimes after more controlled burning, the ground is divided into mecates, which are partitions of land about 75 square feet (7.0 m^{2}) in area. Each worker is given a number of mecates to plant daily. He makes a series of holes, very shallow, in the burned soil about 8 feet (2.4 m) apart in each direction, and places a bud or cutting of a henequen plant in each hole. Each mecate can support 80 to 100 plants. The holes are typically made with a digging stick with a sharp iron point, and are frequently dug directly into the soft, friable, limestone rock.

The planting is completed swiftly, and in a short time a vast extent of territory is planted. During the whole of the first year, and especially toward the close of the rains, the newly planted ground has to be kept clear with machetes. In less than three years, the plants are so large that further care is unnecessary, and in five to seven years they begin to yield. The plants are then nearly 6 feet (1.8 m) high, and bear a great number of stout leaves from 4–5 feet (1.2–1.5 m) long. The leaves are edged with sharp, fishhook-shaped thorns, and the end of the leaf is elongated into a sharp black spine. Each plant yields 20 to 30 leaves yearly for a period of 12 to 20 years, about a third more in the rainy than in the dry season.

== Production ==
Henequen leaves are first cut from the stem quite near the ground, then carried to the mill where they shredded by machinery. The resulting fibers are hung upon rails in the sun to dry, and then compressed by machinery into bales. The whole process is simple and efficient, and a great quantity may be baled in a single day. It takes over 8,000 leaves to make a 400-pound bale. The bales vary in weight from 350 to 450 pounds each.

The period of 1880 to 1915 is considered the henequen boom years. In 1873, 31,000 bales were exported; 1879, 113,000 bales; 1884, 261,000; 1904, 606,000; and in 1915, 1.2 million bales were exported. The production of henequen in 1900 was 500,000 bales; in 1914, the production was 1,026,000 bales, and in 1918 the production had declined to 805,000 bales. At the beginning of the 20th century, there were 87,000 hectares (210,000 acres) planted in henequen. This reached an all-time high in 1916 when 202,000 hectares (500,000 acres), more than 70% of all cultivated land in Yucatán, were dedicated to the production of henequen.

== History ==
Henequen has been grown in the Yucatán since the Mayan civilization, where it was made into ropes and bags, among other items, but emerged as a major crop in the 19th century when its cheap but strong natural fibers were the material of choice for the production of twine and rope for many purposes. The wealthy elites, known as the Divine Caste by their detractors, eventually came to grow henequen in large plantations worked by native and African slaves. Conditions were harsh, but despite the ongoing Caste War of Yucatán, the henequen industry flourished.

The first railroad was a narrow-gauge line constructed between Mérida and Progreso from 1879, and by 1902 a small network of such railroads merged to become the Ferrocarriles Unidos de Yucatán (United Railways of Yucatan) and regauged their lines to standard gauge. There was also an extensive network of 50 cm gauge tramways throughout the region, which uniquely persisted into the late 20th century as public infrastructure after the abandonment of the plantations.

During the presidency of Porfirio Diaz in the 1870s, henequen production skyrocketed thanks to international investment, and in 1898, when the Spanish–American War broke out, the price of fiber spiked. The supplies of Manila hemp were interrupted by the war in the Philippines, and the price of henequen increased to about US$0.10 or $0.12 a pound. The sudden increase in demand brought great wealth to Yucatán and it immediately became the wealthiest state in Mexico. During the early 1900, the State of Yucatán saw rapid strides in education, sanitation, and a general improvement in the well-being of the people.

The high price brought about a boom in Yucatán, and the usual consequences followed, bringing a few mild panics from 1907 to 1911 brought about by speculation and over-extension not only by the banks but by various commercial firms.

The henequen industry was extremely profitable and stable. Yucatán's only major product was henequen, but it became the richest state in the Republic of Mexico by the time of Salvador Alvarado's entry into Yucatán. The planters received an average price of about US$0.05 per pound for their fiber. There were various buyers and exporters of henequen in Yucatán up until 1915, when Alvarado drove them out. When Alvarado reached Mérida, he seized the railways of the State.

In 1912, shortly after the inauguration of governor Nicolás Camára Vales, an organization named the Comision Reguladora del Comercio del Henequen (CRMH), commonly known as the Reguladora, was made of various henequen planters in conjunction with the government of the State. The stated purpose of that organization was to regulate the henequen industry, for example by stockpiling any large accumulation of henequen and holding it until the demand caught up with the supply. The governor of Yucatán was always president ex-officio of the Reguladora.

The Reguladora functioned with more or less success but due to corruption ended up being largely ineffectual. When Alvarado assumed power in 1915, he assumed charge of the Reguladora, appointed his own board of directors, and gave notice that he was to arrange that the Reguladora would be the only institution or firm allowed to deal in henequen in Yucatán. Following this policy, he ordered his director of the railways to refuse to transport any henequen shipped by anybody except to the consignment of the Reguladora.

== See also ==
- List of haciendas of Yucatán

== Bibliography ==
- Baker, Frank Collins (1895). A Naturalist in Mexico: Being a Visit to Cuba, Northern Yucatan and Mexico (Public domain ed.). D. Oliphant. p. 21.
- Evans, Sterling D. (14 January 2013). Bound in Twine: The History and Ecology of the Henequen-Wheat Complex for Mexico and the American and Canadian Plains, 1880-1950. Texas A&M University Press. ISBN 978-1-62288-001-0.
- Fall, Albert Bacon (1920). Investigation of Mexican Affairs: Preliminary Report and Hearings of the Committee on Foreign Relations, United States Senate, Pursuant to S. Res. 106, Directing the Committee on Foreign Relations to Investigate the Matter of Outrages on Citizens of the United States in Mexico (Public domain ed.). United States. Congress. Senate. Committee on Foreign Relations, U.S. Government Printing Office.
- Farm Implement News Company (1894). Farm Implement News. Vol. 15. Chicago, Illinois.
- Pérez de Sarmiento, Marisa; Savarino Roggero, Franco (2001). El cultivo de las élites: grupos económicos y políticos en Yucatán en los siglos XIX y XX. Consejo Nacional para la Cultura y las Artes. ISBN 978-970-18-5419-8.
