= Hacienda San Diego Cutz =

Hacienda and private event venue in Merida Municipality, Yucatán

- Private Event Venue
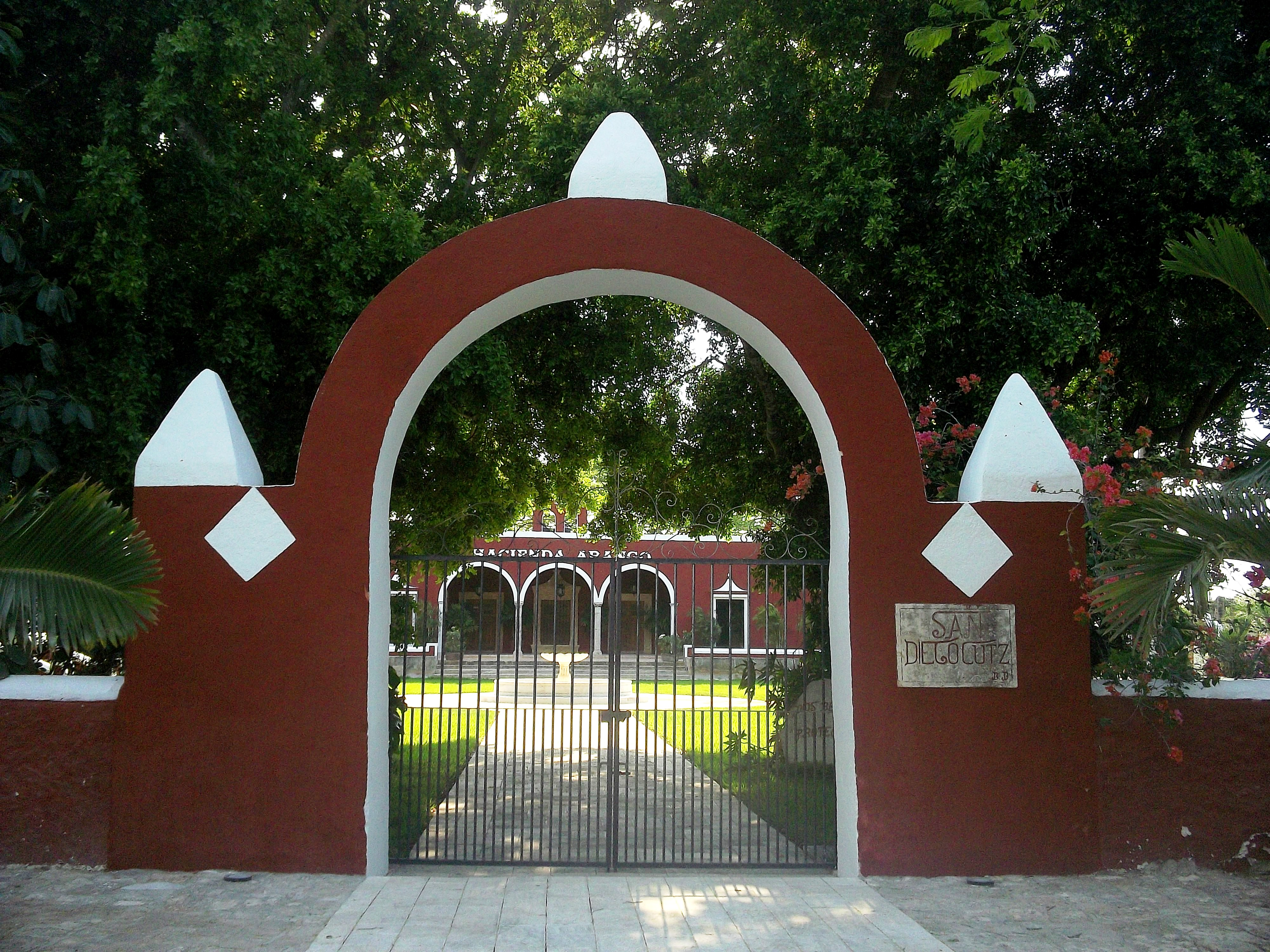
- Entrance of the Hacienda San Diego Cutz under the name of Hacienda Arango (possibly after the recordings of the telenovela Abismo de pasión)

- Location within Yucatán (state) Location within Mexico
- Coordinates: 21.0955191°N 89.5448942°W
- Country: Mexico
- Mexican States: Yucatán
- Municipalities: Conkal Municipality
- Founded: 1874

Population (2010)
  - Total: 0
- Time zone: UTC−6 (CST)
  - Summer (DST): UTC−5 (CDT)
- Postal code: 97345
- Area code: 999

Hacienda San Diego Cutz is a private event venue in the Conkal Municipality in Yucatán, Mexico.

== Toponym ==
The name (San Diego Cutz) refers to Didacus of Alcalá and Cutz means Wild turkey (Meleagris gallopavo) in the Mayan language.

== Historical importance ==
It had its splendor during the time of the henequen boom and issued hacienda tokens which, due to their design, are of interest to numismatists. These records certify the farm as property of J. Ancona and sons in 1874.

=== Historical facts ===
- In 1995 it changes its name from San José Kuché to San Diego Cutz, to distinguish it from the hacienda of similar name in Mérida Municipality.

== In popular culture ==
This hacienda is best known for her role in the Televisa telenovela Abismo de pasión. where is the official residence of the Arango family and where Damían Arango (David Zepeda) and Alfonsina Mondragón (Blanca Guerra) live.

== Demographics ==
According to the 2005 INEGI census, the population of the town was 0 inhabitants.

Population of Cutz by year
Year	1910	1921	1930	1940	1950	1960	1970	1980	1990	1995	2000	2005
Population	233	94	124	5	43	47	2	8	0	?	?	0

== Gallery ==
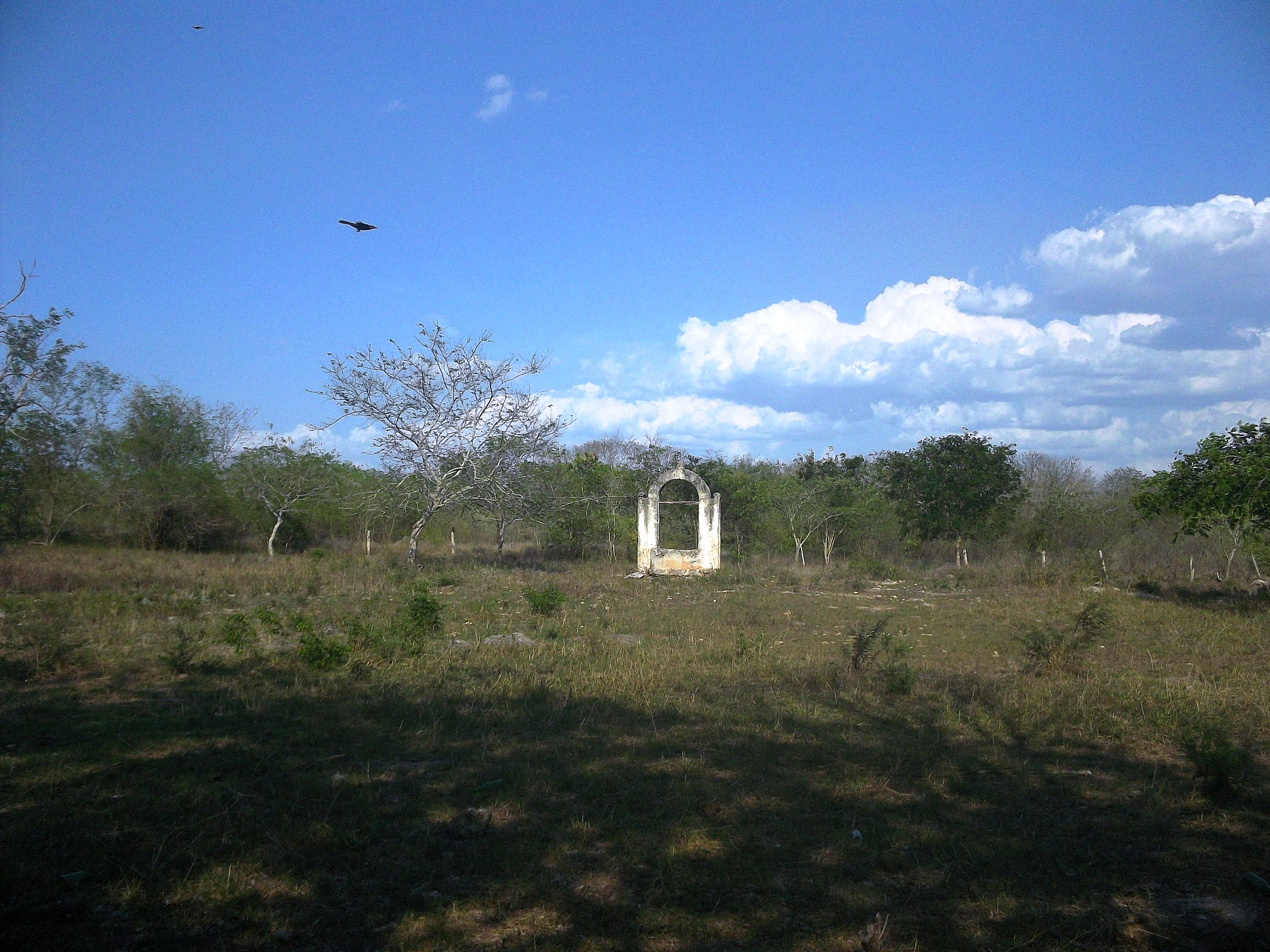
View of a water well in San Diego Cutz

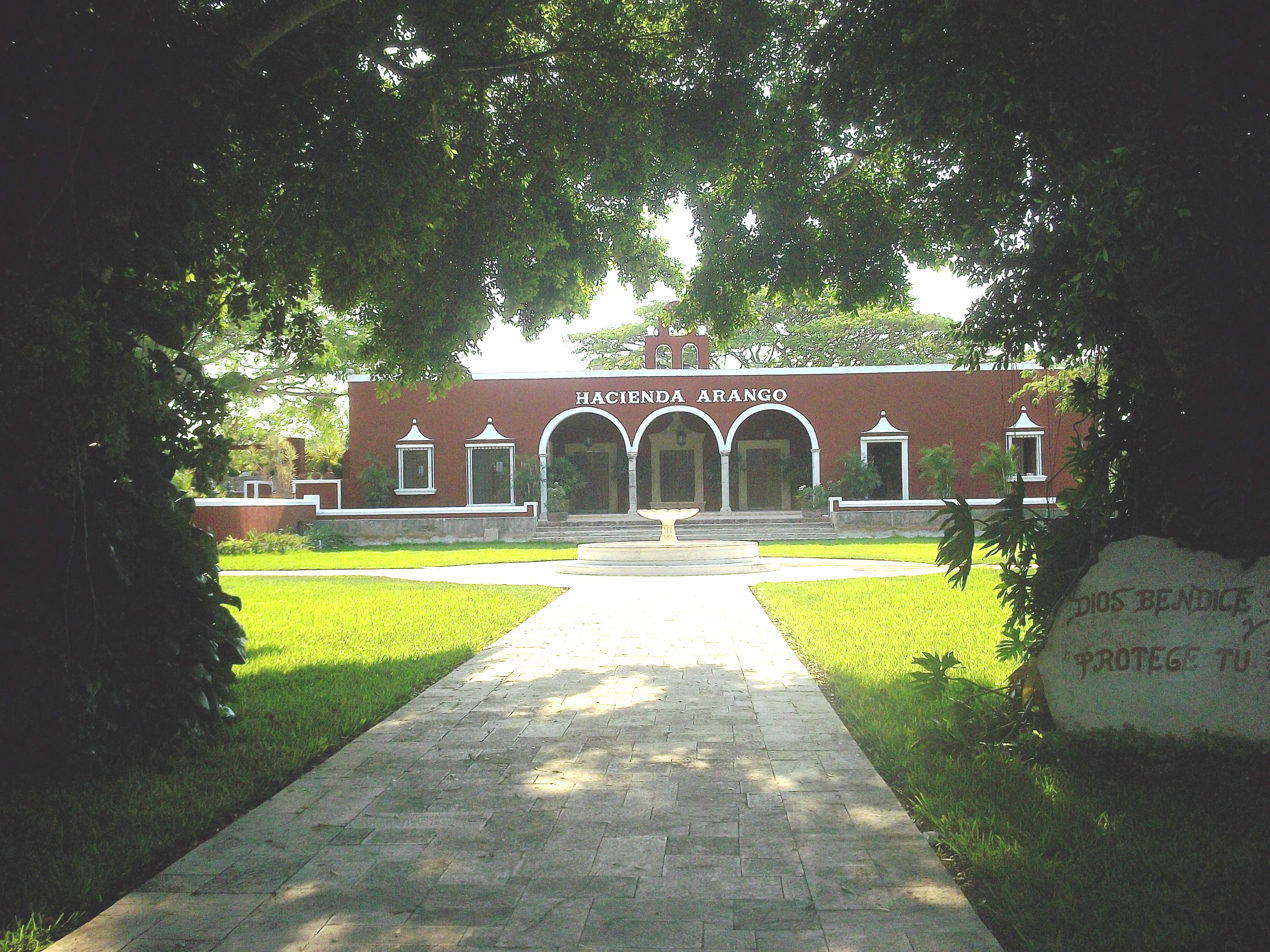
Main garden of the Hacienda

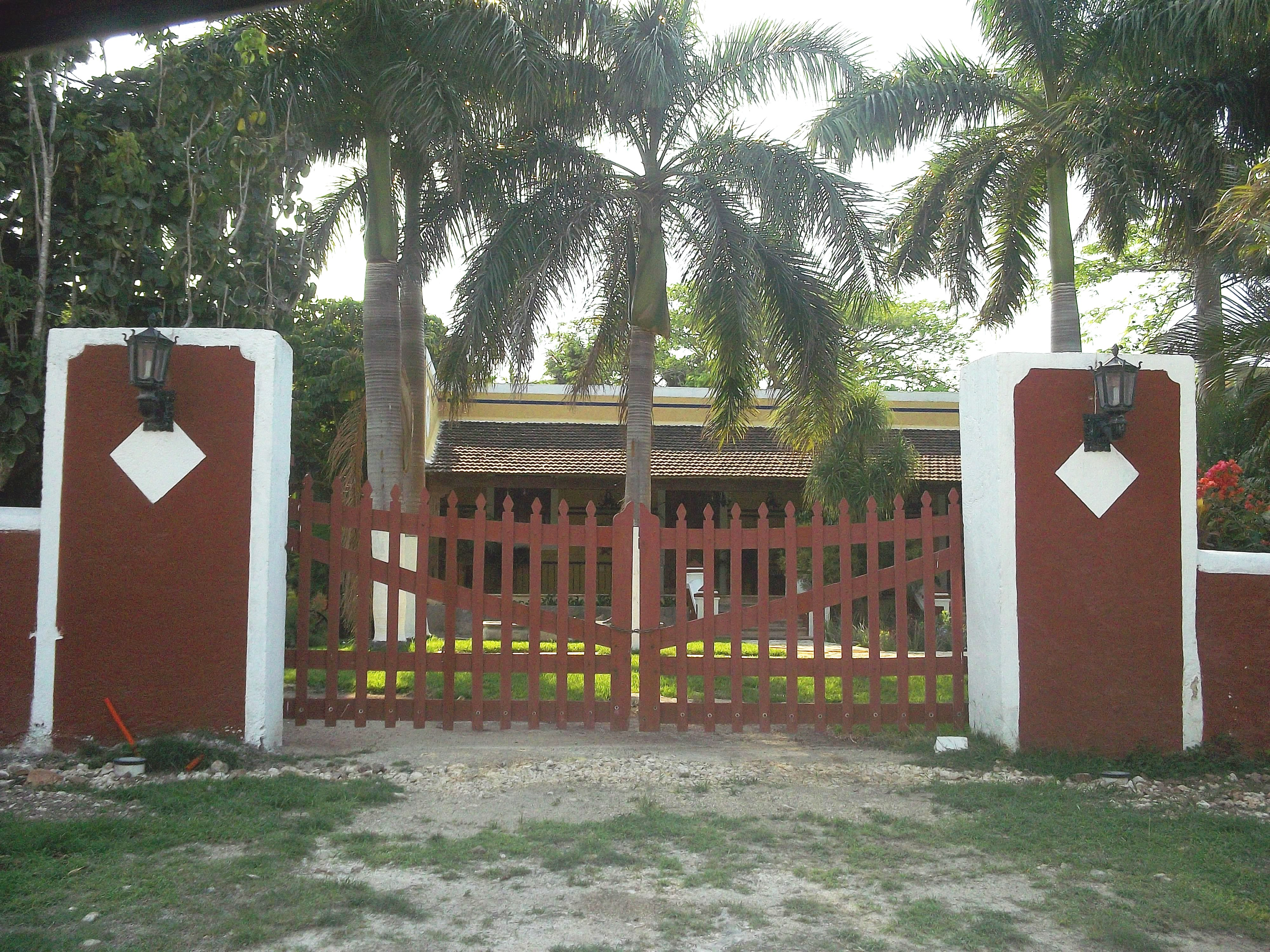
Other rooms

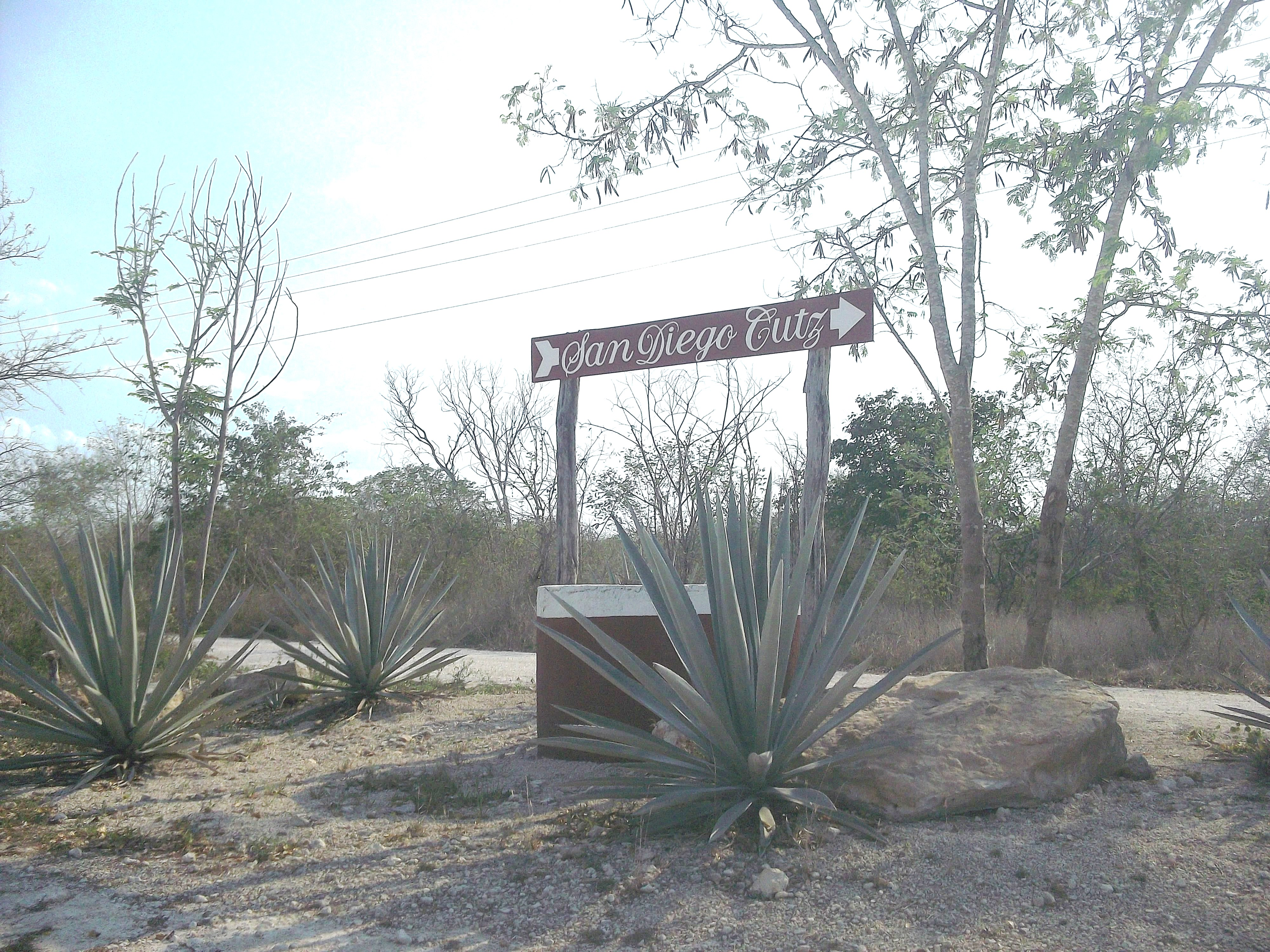
Sign announcing the location of the hacienda
