= Hacienda Cocoyoc =

Archeological site in Mexico

- Hotel Hacienda Cocoyoc
- Hacienda Resort
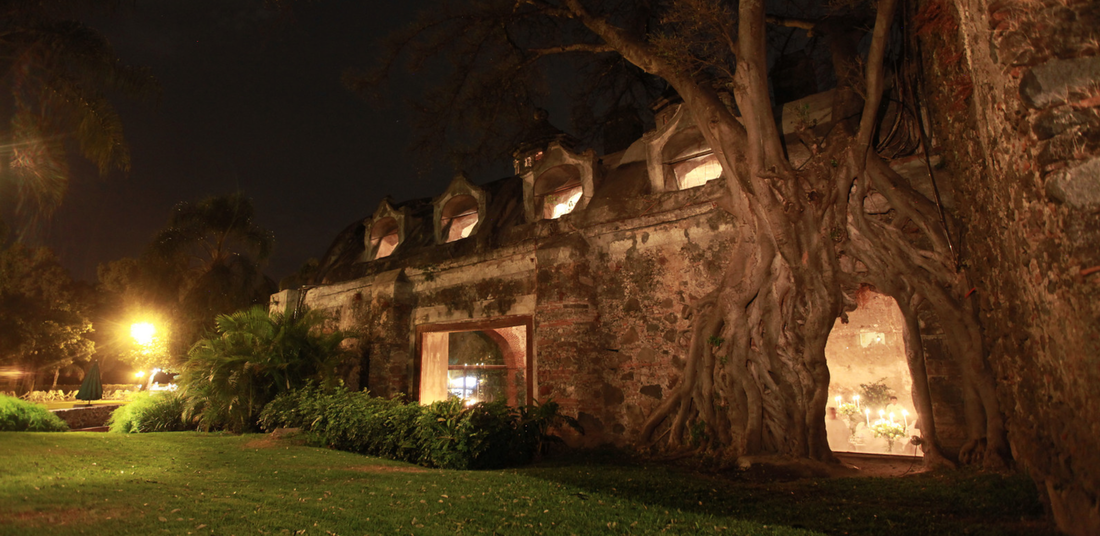
- Interactive map of Hacienda Cocoyoc
- 18.8833°N 98.9850°W
- Location: Cocoyoc, Yautepec, Morelos
- Region: México

History
- Built: 16th century

Site notes
- Area: 25 ha (62 acres)
- Owner: Grupo RT
- Management: Grupo RT
- Public access: Yes
- Website: hcocoyoc.com

The Hacienda de Cocoyoc, now known as the Hotel Hacienda Cocoyoc, is a private hacienda resort located in the state of Morelos, México. In the 17th and 18th centuries it became one of the most important haciendas in the nation and has been declared a Historical Monument by the INAH.

== History ==
=== Pre-Hispanic era ===
Located in the municipality of Yautepec, in the state of Morelos, San Jose Cocoyoc is now a former estate, which after 1960 was restored and adapted to house an extensive hacienda resort. The known history of San Jose Cocoyoc goes back to the times of the Nahua tribes and xochimilcas tlahuicas, occupied the valleys and Huaxtepec Cuauhnáhuac. According to Peter Gerhard, tlahuicas occupied the western part of the region (which extended to Malinalco) and its most important political center was Cuauhnáhuac. The xochimilcas were located in the center and in the eastern part. Yauhtpec formed states, Yacapixtlan, Tepuztlán, Ocuituco and Huaxtepec, the latter being the head of the other dependent. The tlahuicas and xochimilcas formed an agricultural society. They cultivated the fertile valley lands, raised turkeys and dogs escuintles and were engaged in hunting, fishing and gathering. The main food crops that were planted were corn, beans, various vegetables, fruits and grains, such as chili, pumpkin, squash, tomato, and cocoa. In hot areas the main crop was cotton.

His social and political organization was similar to that of other peoples of the Central Highlands. They were grouped in local states (tlatocayotl), which in turn depended on the political and administrative centers and Huaxtepec Cuauhnáhuac. The Mexica domination over the region began in the late 14th century, when Acamapichtli able to submit to the lordship of Cuauhnáhuac. Apparently Mexica lords felt the imperative to achieve mastery of this region to meet their expectations of having the cotton they needed to make their clothing, which was grown in this region. According to some sources, Mr. Mexica Huitzilihuitl, eager to have cotton grown in Morelos, asked for the hand of Miahuaxihuitl, daughter Ozomatzinteuctli (Tezcacohuatzin Itzcoatzin or, according to other sources), lord of Cuernavaca and Miyauaxiuitl, woman Toltec origin. To be denied recourse to war, achieving Cuauhnáhuac subject Mr. and marry his daughter. From this union was born llhuicamina Moctezuma, who years later in his capacity as Mexican emperor, he developed a great appreciation for the fertile lands of their ancestors.

=== Colonial era ===
When completing the conquest of Tenochtitlan in 1521, Cortés immediately showed a decided preference for the territory of the current state of Morelos. He founded the city of Cuernavaca, in the Indian village of Cuauhnáhuac, and established his residence in this city. Some years later, King Charles I of Spain would grant him immense dominion over property, under the name of Marquis del Valle, covering territories in the states of Oaxaca, Guerrero, Morelos and the Federal District itself. Knowing the demand that existed in Spain and in the rest of Europe, for refined sugar, Cortés introduced the cultivation of this plant, establishing a mill in the valley of Cuernavaca, which would be the second of its kind in New Spain. Soon discover that the land of this valley offered the best conditions for growing sugar cane and to the establishment of mills or mills, which required the existing streams abundant in this area. In the example of the Marqués del Valle, and under the land grants given by the king and the perpetual censuses granted by Hernán Cortés and his descendants, in the second half of the 16th century and early 17th centuries, emerged in this area countless mills or mills. With respect to San José Cocoyoc, the sources placed the formation of the mill and the farm in the early 17th century. In this sense that mention is made in these years was granted a perpetual census Isabel Ruiz and Francisco Bernal, for middle ground in Guajoyuca cavalry (who later would be attached to Cocoyoc).

Also mentioned that "the June 22, 1619 Francisco de Sequera was licensed to transform the mill he had in terms of Cocoyoque, on the way passing by Guastepec" The truth is that, according to research by Gisela Von Woebeser, around the sugar plantations of Morelos, was Admiral Pedro de Izaguirre who established the Finance and San José Cocoyoc mill in the second decade of the 17th century, to acquire and Guanacastitlán Tlacomille grounds that belonged to Francisco de Sequera cavalry property that belonged to the clerk of Cuautla Mené Pérez Solis, and land belonging to Diego Ferralde, who had in turn purchased the Convent Santo Domingo de Oaxtepec. Additionally, Admiral Izaguirre had made a valuable acquisition, buying the Indian chieftain Maria Cantia, Xalmile property, which included a dam, and an aqueduct apantle that allowed water to bring Tecuaque Canyon. At the death of Izaguirre, the estate would be inherited by his widow, Mrs. Nicolasa de Izaguirre, while in the year of 1655 we know that belonged to Catherine de Ordaz, who in that year lost a lawsuit against the friars of San Hipólito, owners of neighboring Hacienda del Hospital. It will be in the 18th century that San José Cocoyoc achieved a remarkable growth and development, becoming one of the most successful sugar companies in the region. Between the years of 1711 and 1714, Cocoyoc will record a major expansion with the annexation of the neighboring ranch Pantitlán.

=== Sugar crisis ===
Throughout the colonial period, the activity of the sugar estates was subject to instability affecting its operation. In the late 16th century the Crown banned all exports of sugar from New Spain, which determined that all production was reoriented to the domestic market. Similarly, in 1714, the Crown banned the production of brandy, a product that was an important part of the economy of Wits. Like other branches of production, sugar production in the 18th century suffered the consequences of overproduction coupled with low product demand, causing the price drop and the consequent crisis for estates. Over the next century the estate Cocoyoc came among the twelve plantations major sugar producing country around the early 19th century and its importance grew with the installation of new machinery and a waterwheel in sugar refinery bringing water sources neighbors by an aqueduct that is still under served.

=== 19th century ===
In 1785, the estate was acquired by the enabler of mine, Antonio Velasco de la Torre, while in 1801 it was inherited by his son, Antonio Velasco de la Torre, with whom he began a period of expansion. Velasco obtained a loan of 30,000 pesos for improvements to the property and in the year of 1823 introduced coffee cultivation. Known as the "coffee Velasco", would be very well accepted in the region and Mexico City itself. On the death of Antonio, the estate was inherited by his three daughters, Margaret, Josefa and Guadalupe, who nevertheless fail to have the success that his father had made and end up losing the property for debt, fronts the landowner of the region John Goribar, who is in turn the owner of the neighboring ranch Casasano. It is at this time that the estate is visited by Frances Inglis Elskine Calderon de la Barca, who makes an interesting description of it. After the death of John Goribar, the estate was inherited by his son Jesus Goribar, who in 1875 sold it to Isidoro de la Torre, who in turn was the owner of the neighboring estates of St. Charles Borromeo and St. Nicholas Pantitlán. Years later, the property would be inherited by his son Tomas de la Torre, who must suffer the dissolution and disappearance of the Treasury, before the land redistribution that takes place as a result of the Mexican Revoludón, which will enable the creation of 13 ejidos. As was common in these cases, following the implementation of agrarian reform, the hull of the property was abandoned, until 1957, when a real estate entrepreneur, Mr. Paulino Rivera Torres, acquired, starting from the time its restoration and empowerment, with a view to creating an original farm was to be resort that opened in 1967 and remains offering this served to date.

=== Madame Calderon de la Barca in San Jose Cocoyoc ===
In February 1841, Ms. Frances Erskine Inglis Calderon de la Barca, as part of a long journey through the countryside and villages in the center of the Mexican Republic, visit the Hacienda San José Cocoyoc and write a short story and excited about the impression that causes this visit. Madame Calderon de la Barca was attended by Juan Goribar, owner of the estate, who Ilevo to know the most representative of his estate as the mill, coffee grinder and liquor factory. But what impact this British visitors were the orange, with about three thousand trees, fruit trees, the many streams and flowers. In his account exclaims excitedly that "I had never seen a sight so beautiful". Through his story, Madame Calderon de la Barca confirms that after the critical stages that crossed the property when her owners were the daughters of Don Antonio Velasco de la Torre, San Jose Cocoyoc was in a period of splendor, the industrial facilities qualify as "first-order" and to describe the beauty and perfection of its fruit áboles.

=== 20th century ===
La Hacienda Cocoyoc continued to grow and prosper until the outbreak of the 1910 revolution, when the agrarian leader Emiliano Zapata, Morelos native and established his headquarters in neighboring Cuautla, declared war on all the sugar plantations. When the revolution finally ended eleven years later, the Hacienda Cocoyoc was reduced by the distribution of land among the farmers and peasants and the remainder, 68 acres was purchased in 1957 by Mr. Paulino Rivera Torres, who has now realized his dream to convert a portion of this property, about 28 acres in a superb and well provided Hacienda Resort called "Paradise of America."

== Infrastructure ==
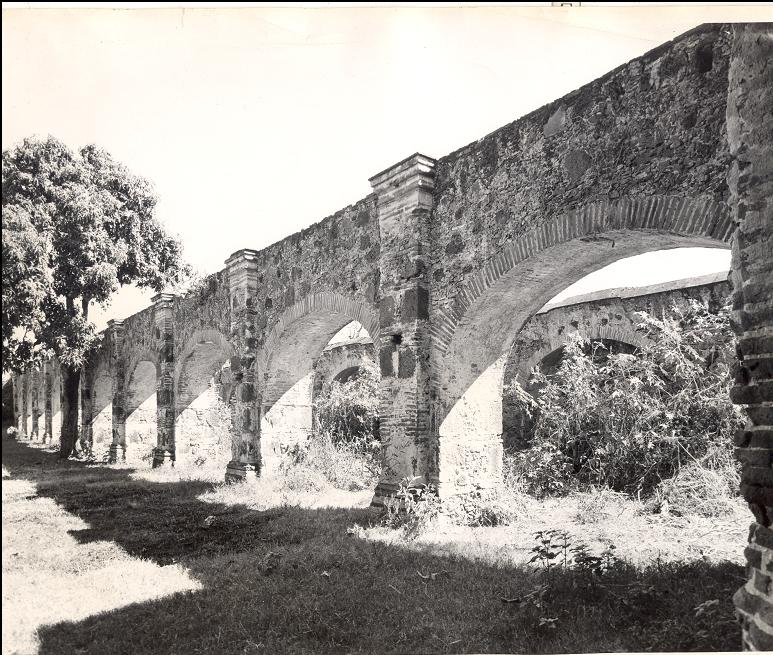
The aqueduct

Like other neighboring farms as Tlayacapan, Tepoztlan or Tlaquiltenango, San Jose Cocoyoc was built imitating the medieval European forts. This was due to the simple fact that there was at that time the builders enough that could make the architectural design of a hacienda.

=== El Ingenio ===
At that time mills were appointed to those establishments that had equipment or machine moved by animal traction or hydraulic. These required a very specialized job and the "understanding" of a specialist to build and to repair. Hence, by extension, in general, words or art mills in these centuries were synonymous with "complex machines".

=== Finances ===
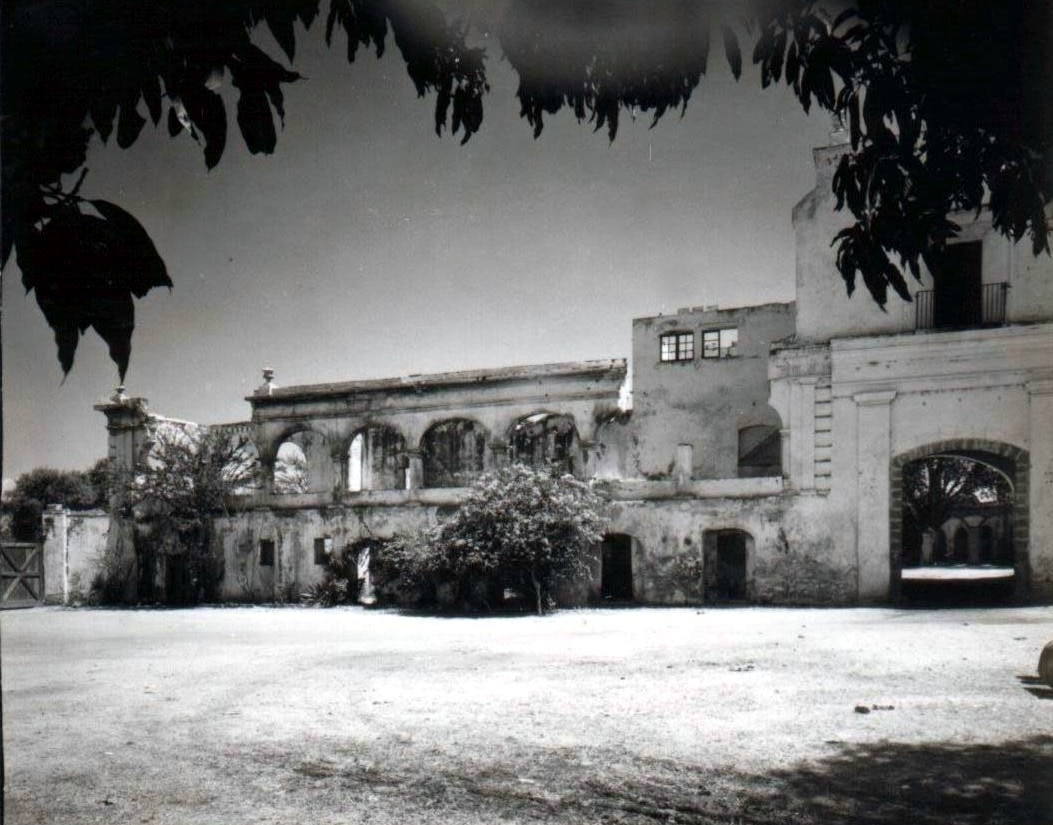
The Hacienda helmet.

Following the pattern of the hacienda in New Spain, consider the hacienda of San Jose Cocoyoc was a property that met the architectural spaces, machinery and workers needed to be a self-sufficient economic unit in which even exercised the judicial authorities and decided who punish and how, which resulted in the existence of a prison within the estate.

=== Main house ===
During colonial and 19th century, houses economically powerful people both in the cities and in the countryside consisted of a lower and high arranged around a central courtyard with a garden or front. The bedrooms are located on the top, and the other rooms of the owners or their guests, rooms and pantries, stored, and so on. At the bottom were the kitchen, next to a water fountain in the courtyard, rooms and spaces dedicated or trade, the store or the same output spaces (purge) or artisans offices, stables and corrals, even Hence integrated jail cell where they kept the workers according to the owner or his representative had done something wrong. Of course this, as in so many farms, nowadays we find no trace of the rooms of the Indians and slaves, because these were made of perishable materials.

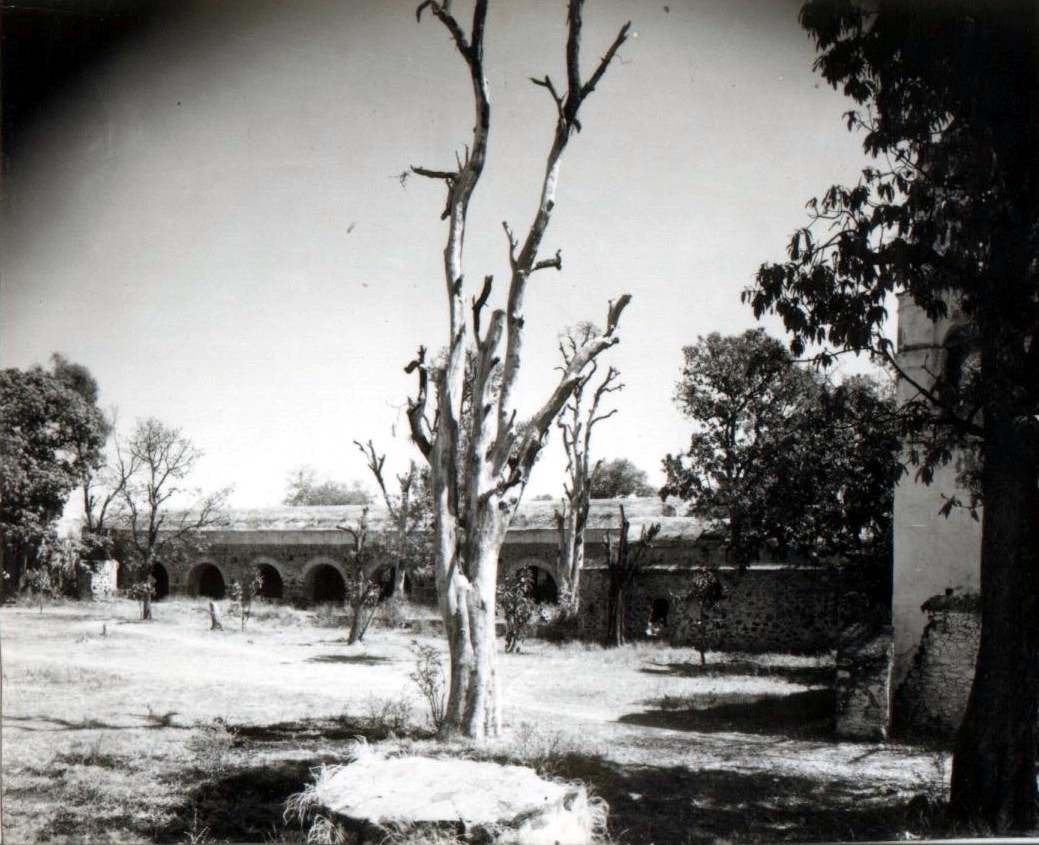
The House and Chapel.

=== Chapel ===
The building of this was closely linked with the social and economic status of the owner, for at that time could not have prospered without wit chapel or church to represent the peak.

=== El Trapiche ===
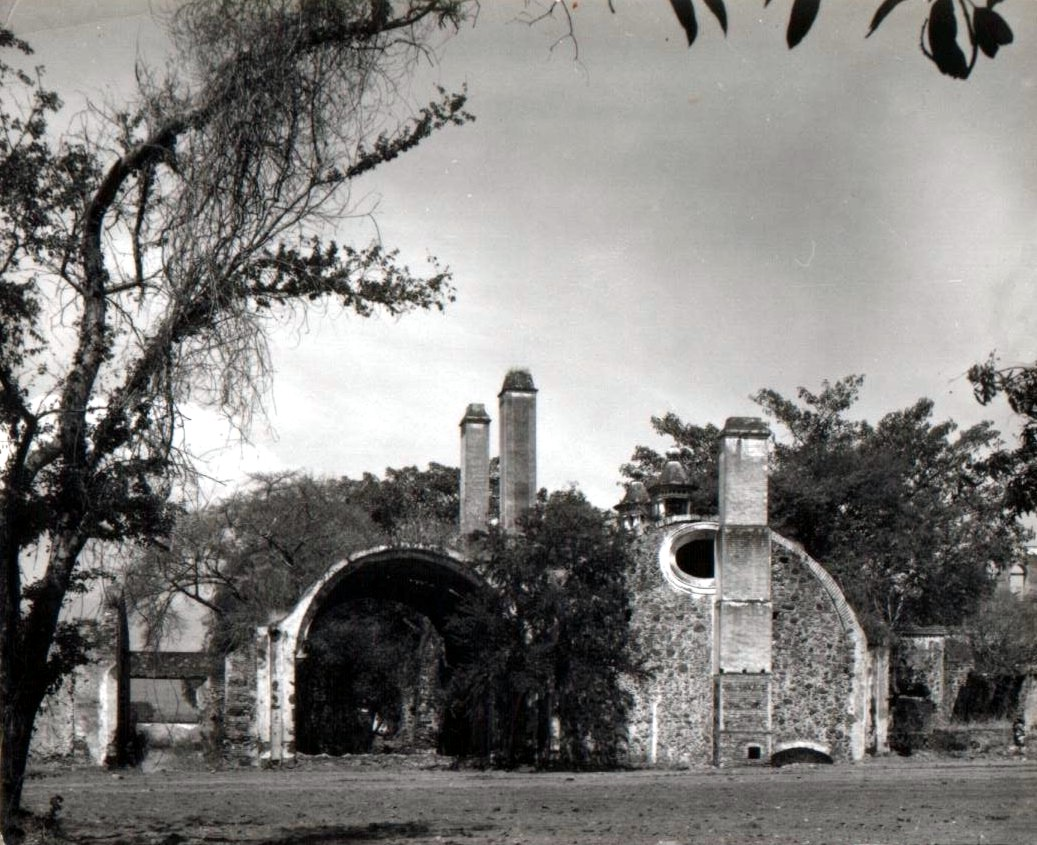
El Trapiche.

La Hacienda de San José Cocoyoc was basically dedicated to the cultivation and processing of sugar cane, to get the grain of sugar would be sold both domestically and internationally. The processing of sugar cane was achieved through a complex process as beginning at the mill, where freshly cut reeds arrived, they were introducias by an operator at the mill. The canes were crushed by the action of two wheels found, yielding cane juice, which in turn was driven by wooden troughs to the boiler room. Furthermore, the rods or rod fragments that remained after this process were pressed in a press of large dimensions, to obtain the juice that had not been achieved by the action of the mill. In the boiler room, the juice was poured into 5 or 6 boilers, color receiving large ovens - for 3–4 m height - called burners, bringing the cane juice is heated and concentrated. In the last of these boilers, called trash, you gave the point to Roan. Boiler, the juice obtained was taken to the house drain and mud poured into forms that had a hole in the bottom, covered with banana leaf. In these earthen vessels, crystallized sugar, giving, by runoff, a honey that was again poured over sugar loaves thereby achieving whitening purging or sugar. Finally, the crystallized sugar pieces were placed in a solarium, which concluded the drying process, being ready for consumption. In the sugar plantations of the New Spain, in the 17th century preferably use water mill water wheel, in combination with the press, while in the 18th century, it was common to use the mill animal traction.

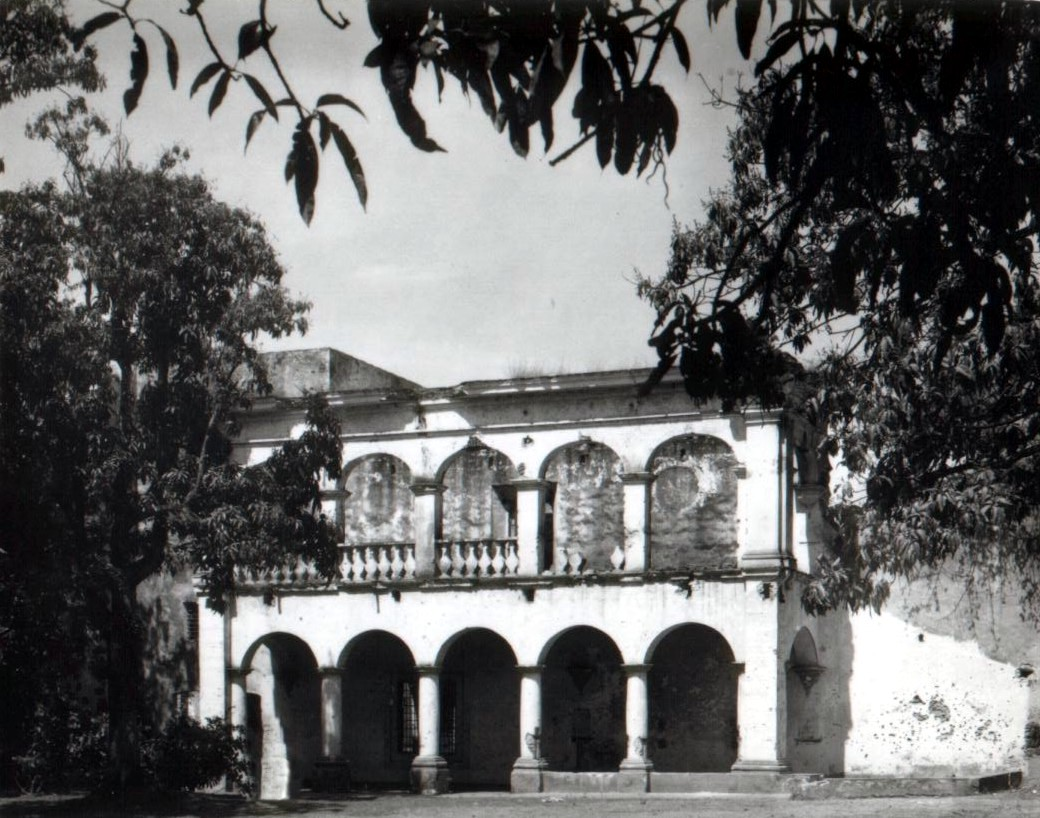
The house manager

=== The value of the hacienda ===
Importantly, according to studies conducted by Dr. Gisela Von Woebeser, specializing in sugar plantations of Morelos, San Jose Cocoyoc was one of the most valuable estates that were in the region and at a time ranked first place. And also notes that "great wits were comparable, in terms of value, the property belonging to the most prominent members of the landed elite of the city of Mexico, ranging from 75,000 to 15.00 pesos."

== Work ==
The processing of sugar cane hacienda such, required a variety of skilled workers to carry out:

=== Administrators ===
Administrator: Usually a relative of the owner; Steward: Responsible for enforcing the orders of the Administrator

=== In the fields ===
Corporals, captains, Irrigators, Planters, Cutters, carretoneros, cane Lifters

=== The Trapiche ===
Grinders, Master of sugar, or meleros Boilermakers, wheeler-dealers, Homers, Ashtrays, Drain Master, Officers craftsmen: carpenters, arches, blacksmiths.

One of the biggest problems I face the sugar planter in colonial labor was. The first mills or mills employed Indian labor that gave them their own parcel. Indians also used rebels who had been enslaved and forced distribution resorted to Indians. However, the use of Indian labor was hampered by the dramatic decline in the Indigenous population that occurred especially in the 16th century and the restrictions imposed by the colonial authorities that privileged the use of Indian labor for the mining sector. Given the difficulties faced by the indigenous labor employment, farmers resorted to buying African slaves. These slaves performed a variety of jobs, working as wheeler-dealers, prenseros, bakers, tinkers, ashtrays and artisans. Also carried out field work, livestock and shepherds, or were serving as cocheres, carretoneros and carriers. Women slaves, meanwhile, performed jobs like cooking, child care and provide them the catechism. The purchase of slaves used to represent a very strong monetary investment for the landowner and it was common for the highest value of the sugar mills represent what precisely their slaves and machinery and land. Slavery in the estates was not exempt from abuse and cruelty. They lived in miserable huts and could not ever leave the Iímites of the hacienda. To ensure the survival of the slaves, they were often marked as the cattle, with a hot iron on his face. Their living conditions were so deplorable that many victims died of disease, while some chose suicide to end their suffering. And it was common to avoid having children, to spare these penalties to which they would be subjected. Among the slaves of the sugar mills, the situation calls attention guarding who played the position of Master of sugar, since that work experience required. This worker had to recognize when he was just right juice boiling sugar cane and had been in different boilers or copper pots. It motivated her condition was of great consideration from the rest of the workers whether slaves or free, and even in some cases have reached a power and respect so that they were seen as witches.
