= Hacienda Eknakán =

- Private Residence
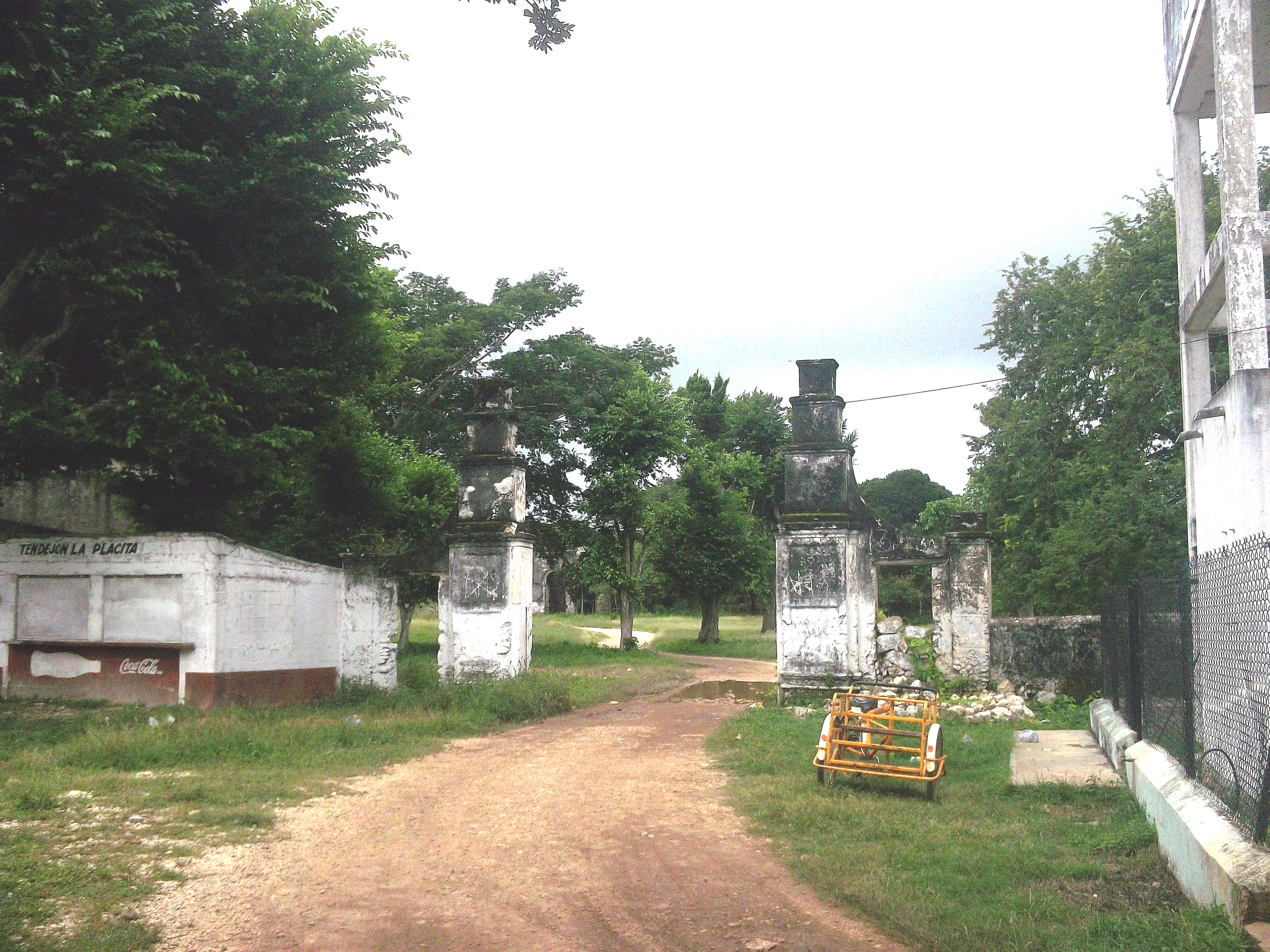
- Entrance Hacienda Eknakán, Yucatán.

- Location in Mexico
- Coordinates: 20°45′31″N 89°22′12″W
- Country: Mexico
- Mexican States: Yucatán
- Municipalities: Cuzamá Municipality
- Time zone: UTC−6 (CST)
  - Summer (DST): UTC−5 (CDT)
- Postal code: 97577
- Area code: 988

Hacienda Eknakán (aka San José Eknacán) is located in the Cuzamá Municipality in the state of Yucatán in southeastern Mexico 48 kilometers southeast of the city of Mérida, between the towns of Acanceh and Cuzamá. It is one of the properties that arose during the nineteenth century henequen boom. It is unusual in that it was built with the plan to become a religious center around its church.

== Toponymy ==
The name (Eknakán) is a word from the Mayan language meaning the black house of the snake.

== How to get there ==
Take the Mérida-Valladolid highway 180 east to the Teya-Peto cut off (highway 18). Proceed south to Acanceh and take the Carretera Acanceh–Cuzamá southeast to Eknakán. The puebla and hacienda of the same name, is located approximately 4 km prior to reaching Cuzamá.

== History ==
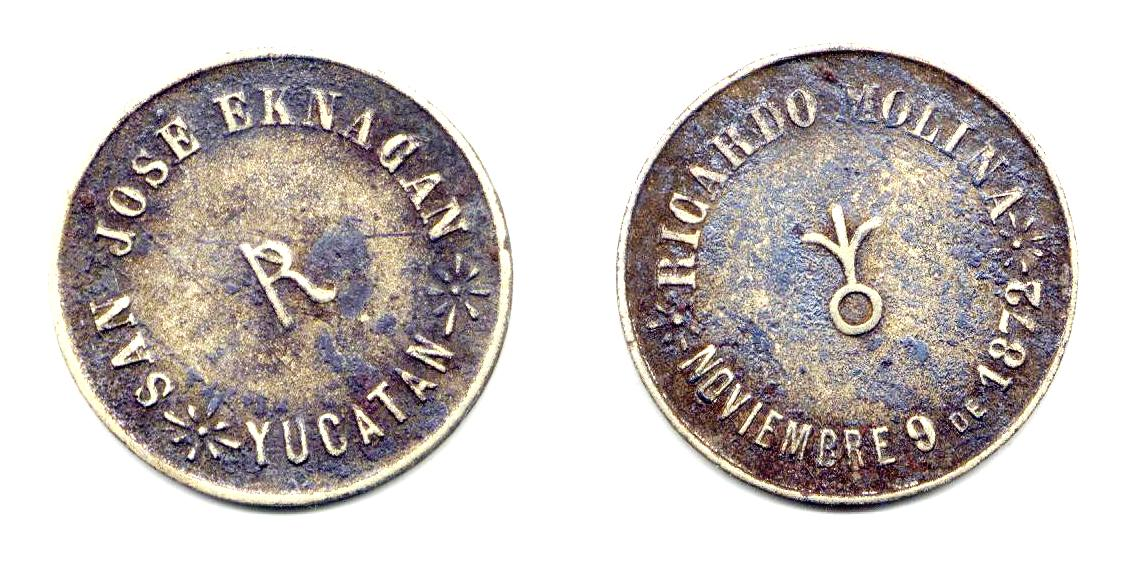
Hacienda tokens San José Eknacán, Yucatán 1872 front and back

The hacienda was built as a cattle ranch and later switched to henequen.

Richard Molina Solís purchased "San José Eknacán" in 1872 and three years later began the commercial planting of henequen and began rapidly increasing the acreage available for planting. In 1901 Molina expanded the operation by purchasing Dzitiná and in 1903 he acquired Hacienda San Isidro Ochil, 20 miles to the south.

Agrarian reforms first occurred in Eknakán in 1919 but lands were not ceded to surrounding towns until 1921–22, at which point nearly 1,500 hectares of land were awarded to the town of Seyé. In 1923 the hacienda lost an additional 861.94 hectares of acreage to Cuzamá. Though the owners appealed all the way to the Supreme Court, the land awards were upheld in 1929 and an additional portion of land given to Acanceh. Despite these disputes, the henequen production remained in private hands on Eknakán until 1935. As the land reforms of 1937 progressed, the hacienda owners' holdings were reduced to 144 hectares.

In the late 1950s into the 1960s in an effort to move away from henequen production, the hacienda was diversified back into livestock, primarily poultry, cattle and pigs. Another unusual aspect of the hacienda was that the owners performed scientific experiments on their yields of henequen to improve planting methods and yields.

The hacienda is currently owned by Ernesto Molina García.

== Architecture ==
=== Church ===
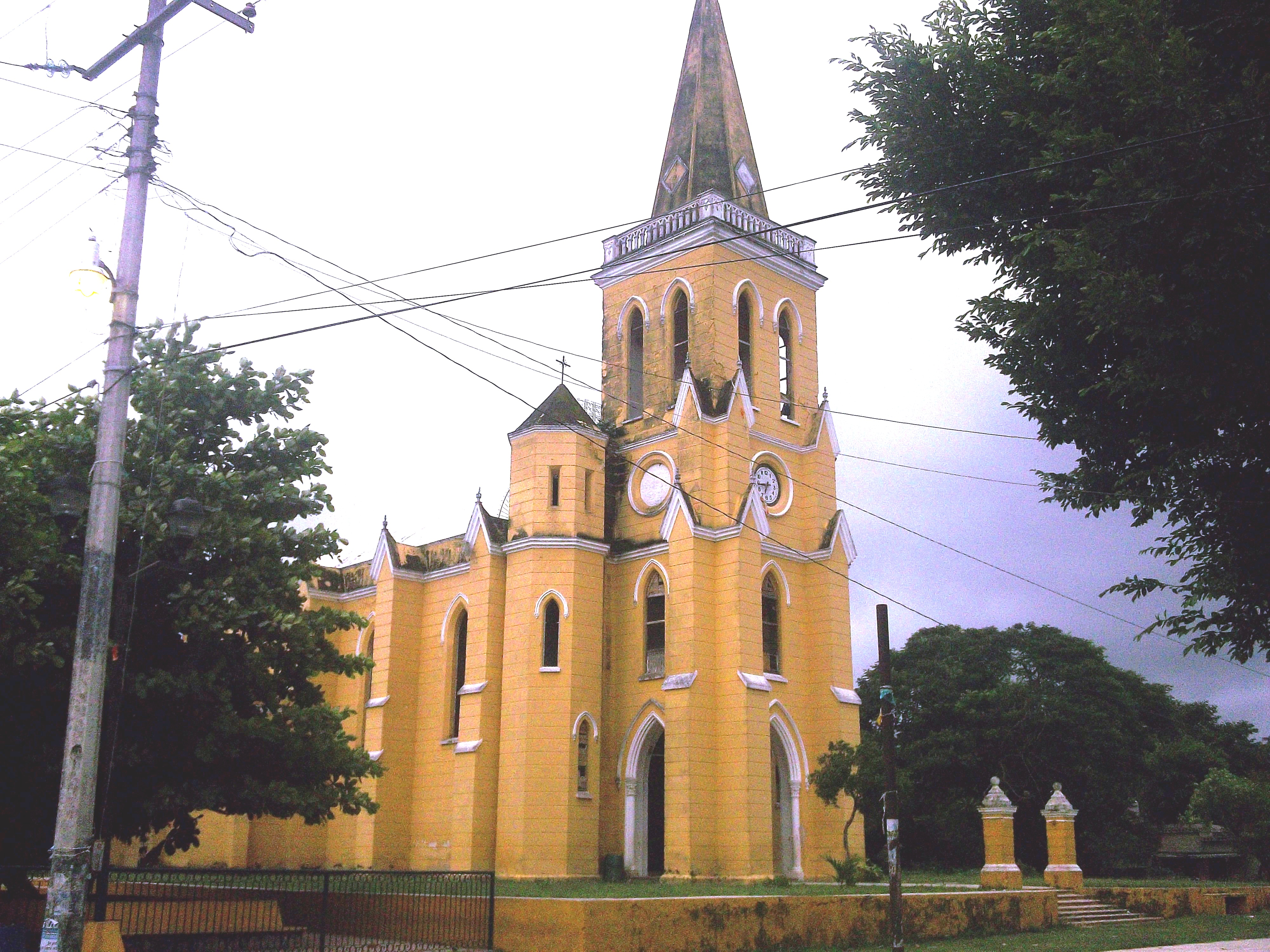
Church at Hacienda Eknakán

The church in Eknakán is of classic German Gothic architecture, and is currently considered a museum. It has numerous stained-glass windows, in both typical Gothic forms and circular forms creating a diffusion of colored lighting throughout the interior of the church.

The choir loft is supported by white masonry columns. The main altar, also features columns and wooden ornamentation, which are reached by a staircase of granite. To one side is a chapel with a carved table holding an image of San Francisco and at his feet is a wooden horse.

There is a large oil painting of the Virgin in a massive carved, wooden frame. Ancient bells, bowls, a baptismal font, a closet with priestly garments and three wooden chests are also on display. The church can be seen throughout the entire area as well as from the adjoining haciendas.

=== Hacienda ===
Hacienda Eknakán consists of two parts. The first is walled and contains the main house and other colonial buildings. In the second, organized around a large square, stand the chapel and the powerhouse, as well as the village for the "acasillados" (farm laborers) on its northern side.

The oldest constructions are those in the walled area, which were related to cattle raising. The main house is on a raised platform and the front and rear façades are flanked with arched porches. Typical eclectic and neoclassical elements are present, as is the main stairway entrance.

The second area houses the buildings dedicated to production once the property was converted to agriculture. There is the shredder, the machine room, the cellar and the packaging area.

== Cenote Papak'al ==
Cenote Papak'al is on the grounds of the hacienda and accessed near some of the ruins of the hacienda. From the entrance to the cave, there is an underground chamber about 50 meters long and 40 meters wide, with a floor to ceiling height of approximately 20 meters which descends into a pool of clear water. There is a massive line of stalactites and stalagmites present. The submerged part of the cave consists of approximately 380 meters of recognized passages, which were first explored in 1982.

== Demographics ==
All of the henequen plantations ceased to exist as autonomous communities with the agrarian land reform implemented by President Lazaro Cardenas in 1937. His decree turned the haciendas into collective ejidos, leaving only 150 hectares to the former landowners for use as private property. Figures before 1937 indicate populations living on the farm. After 1937, figures indicate those living in the community, as the remaining Hacienda Eknakán houses only the owner's immediate family.

According to the 2010 census conducted by the INEGI, the population of the city was 698 inhabitants, of whom 364 were men and 334 were women. Since that time, the inhabitants are enumerated in the City of Mérida figures.

Population of Eknakán by year
Year	1910	1921	1930	1940	1950	1960	1970	1980	1990	1995	2000	2005	2010
Population	385	292	265	223	282	302	368	499	533	570	615	645	698

== Bibliography ==
- Bracamonte, P and Solís, R., Los espacios de autonomía maya, Ed. UADY, Mérida, 1997.
- Gobierno del Estado de Yucatán, "Los municipios de Yucatán", 1988.
- Kurjack, Edward y Silvia Garza, Atlas arqueológico del Estado de Yucatán, Ed. INAH, 1980.
- Patch, Robert, La formación de las estancias y haciendas en Yucatán durante la colonia, Ed. UADY, 1976.
- Peón Ancona, J. F., "Las antiguas haciendas de Yucatán", en Diario de Yucatán, Mérida, 1971.

== Photo gallery ==
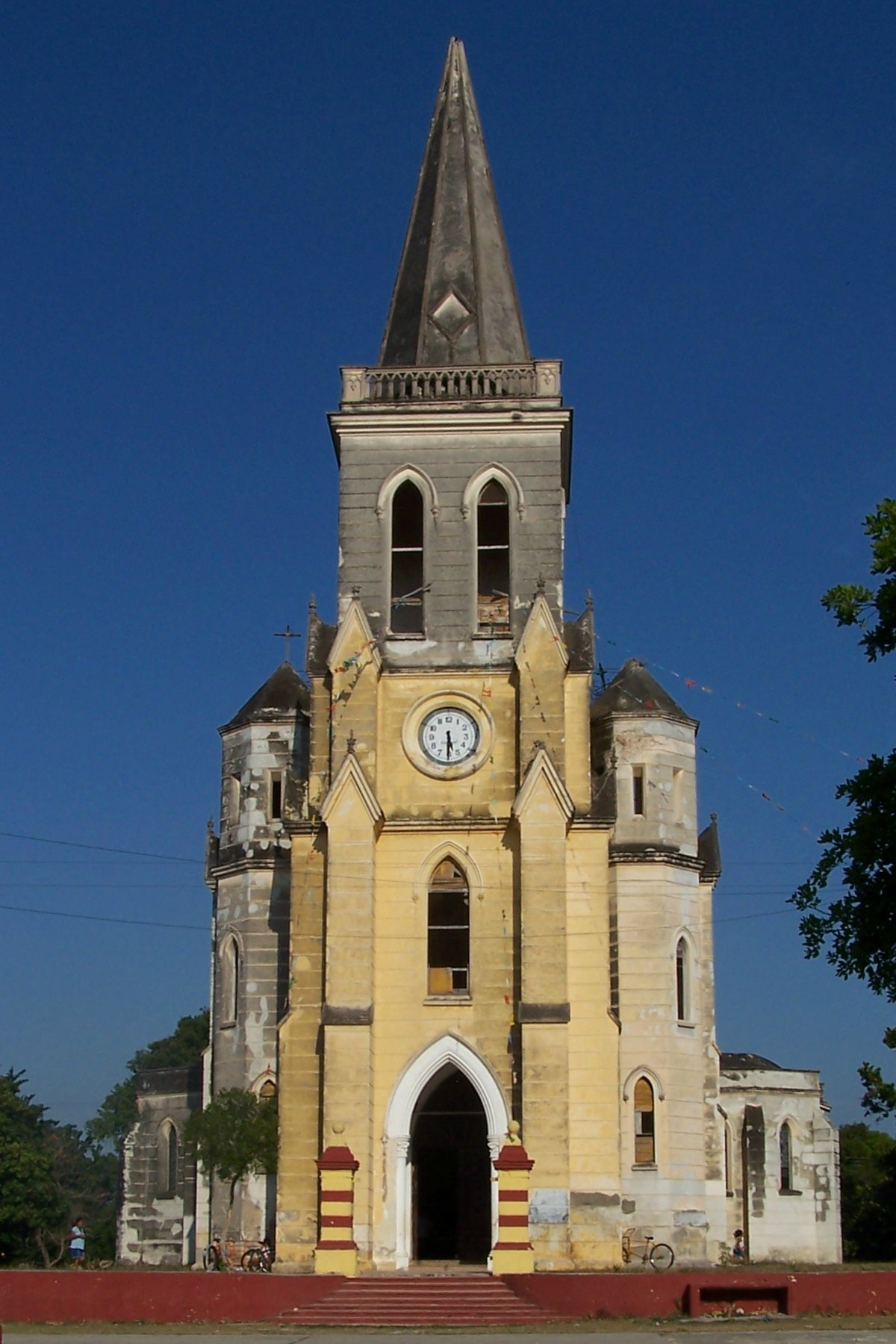
Church at Hacienda Eknakán

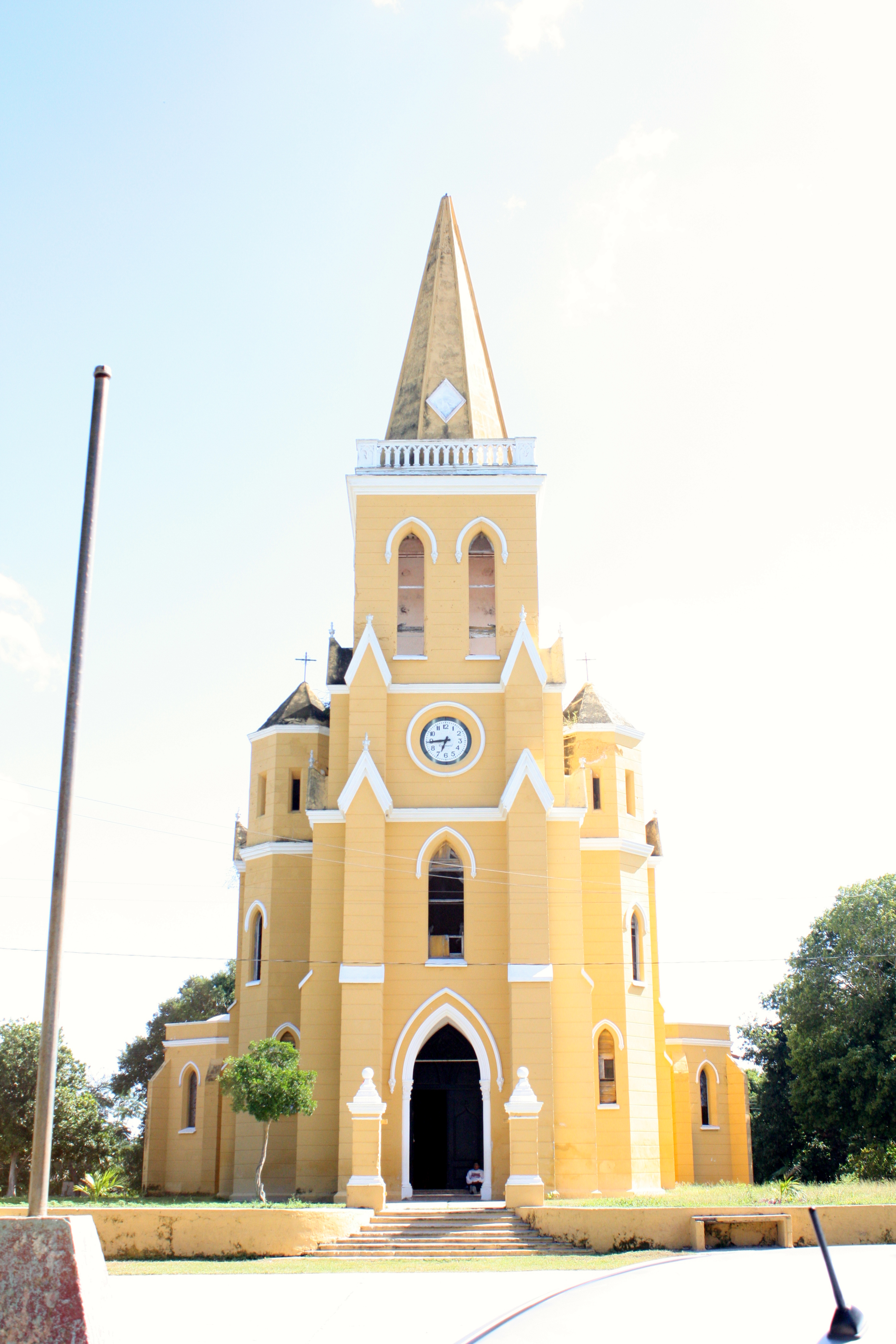
Church at Hacienda Eknakán

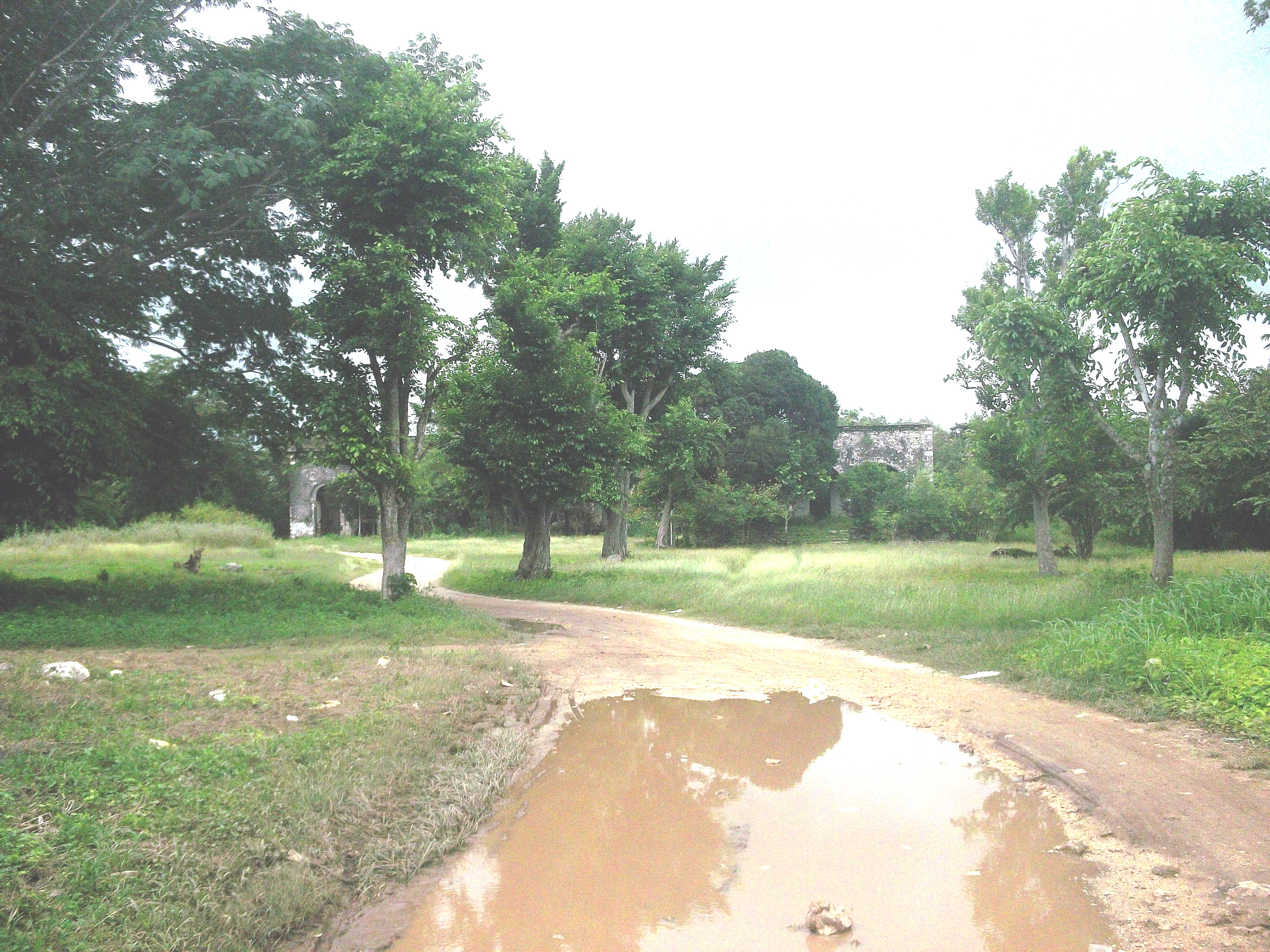
Hacienda Eknakán

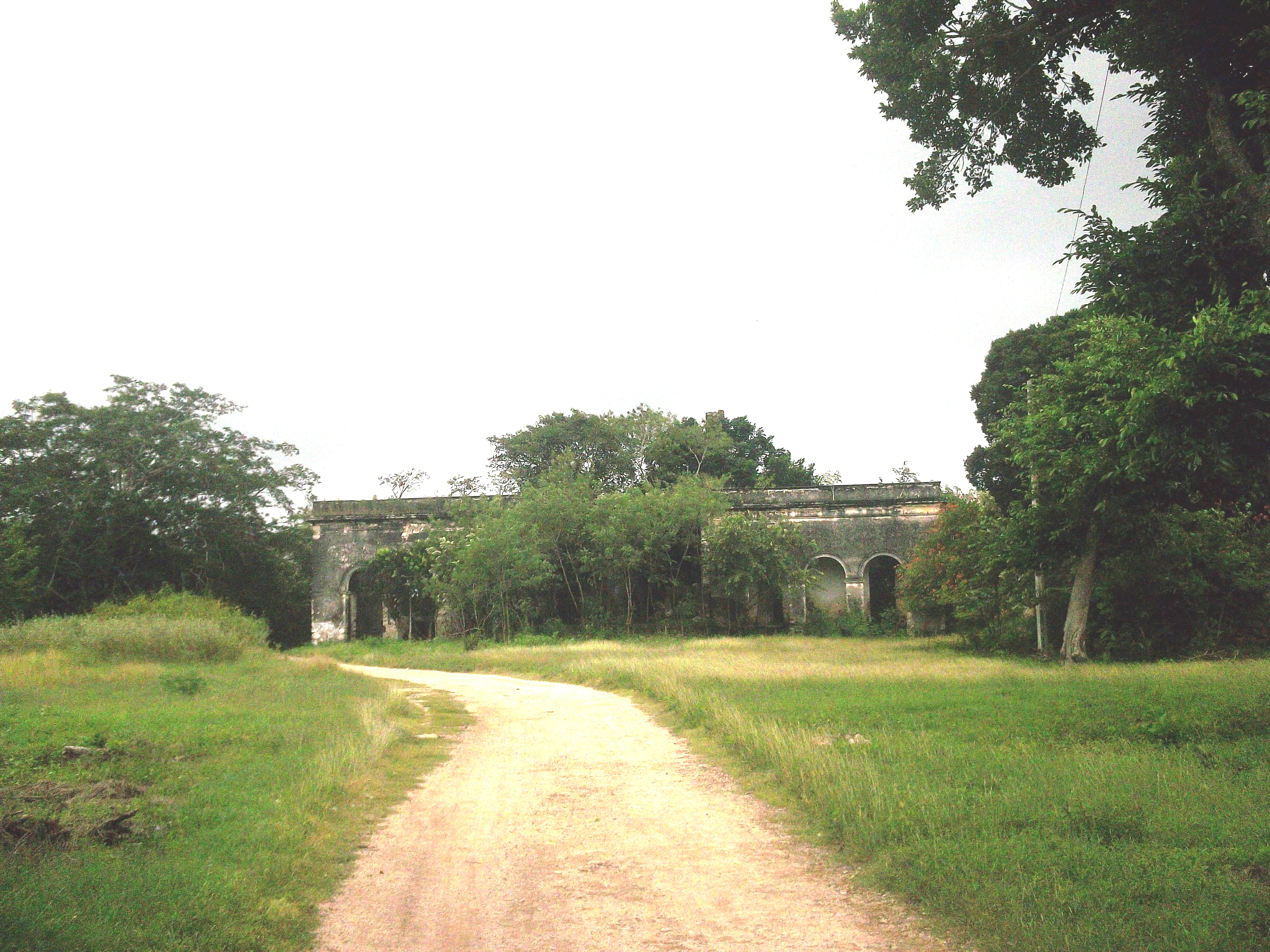
Hacienda Eknakán

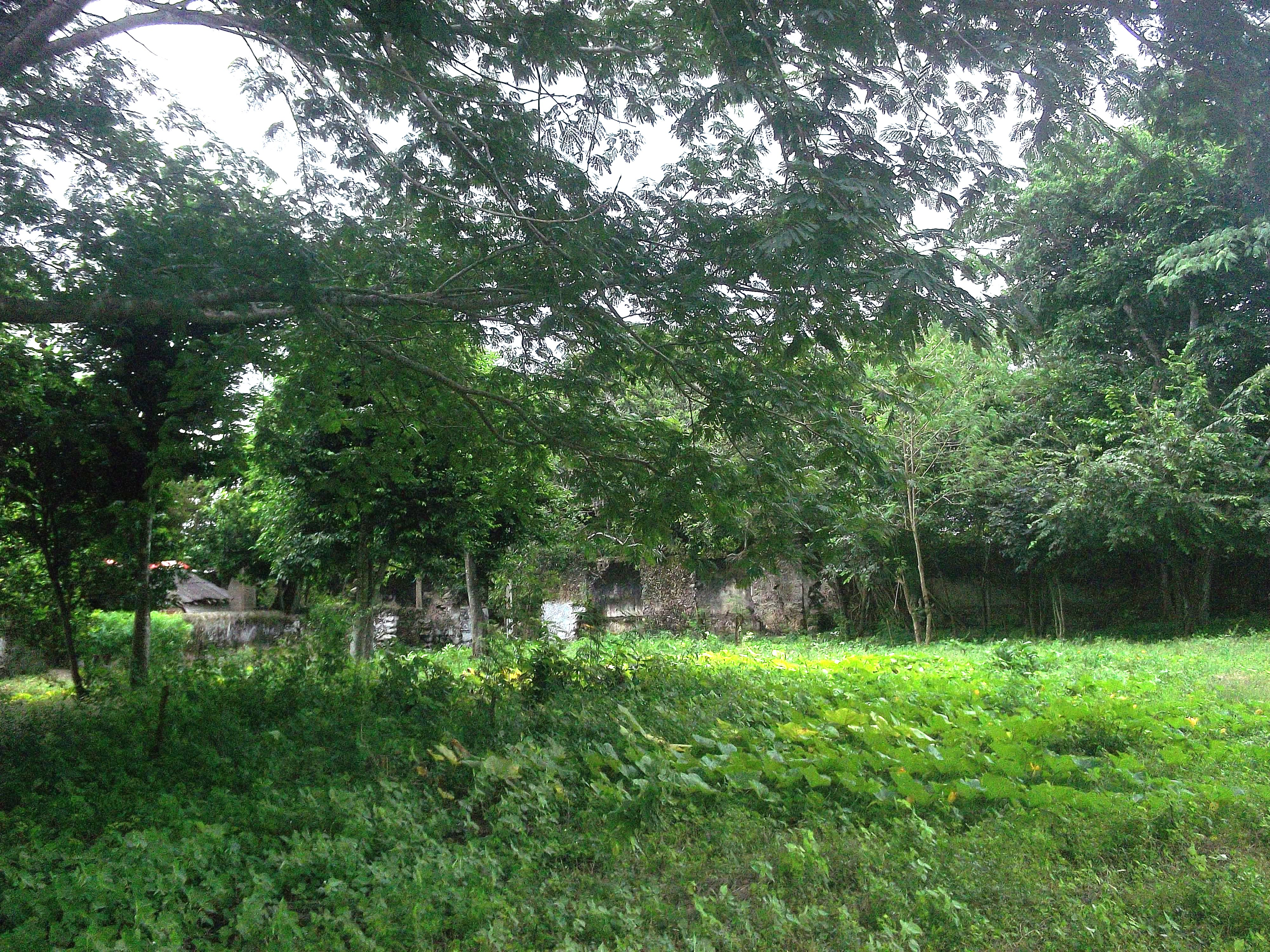
Hacienda Eknakán

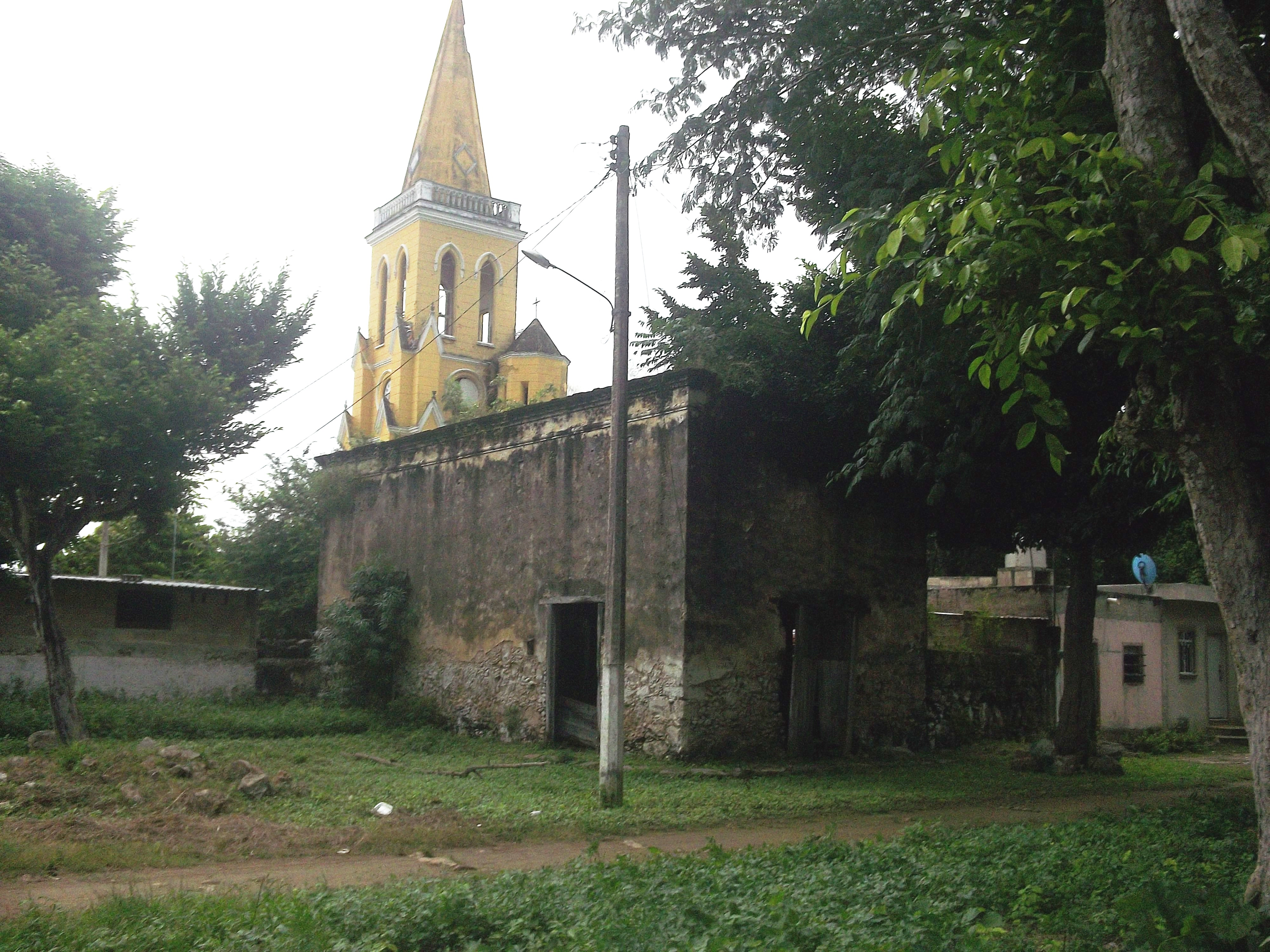
Hacienda Eknakán

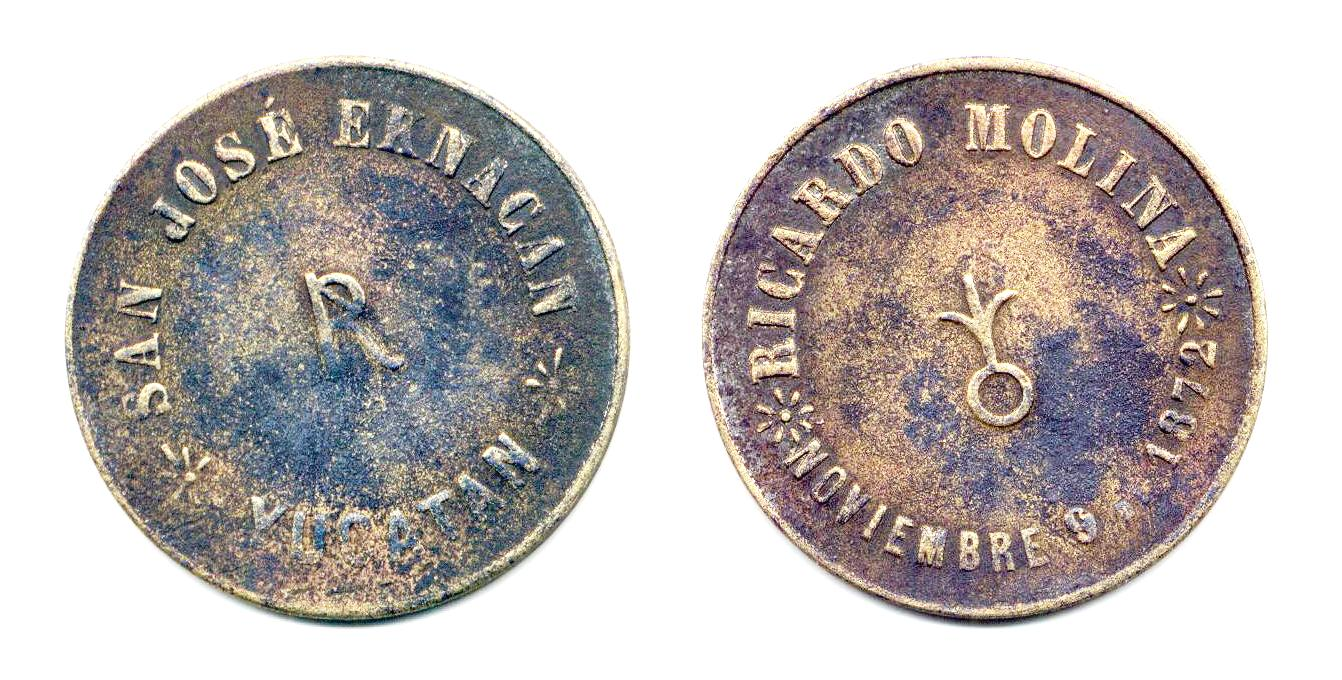
1872 Hacienda tokens San José Eknacán

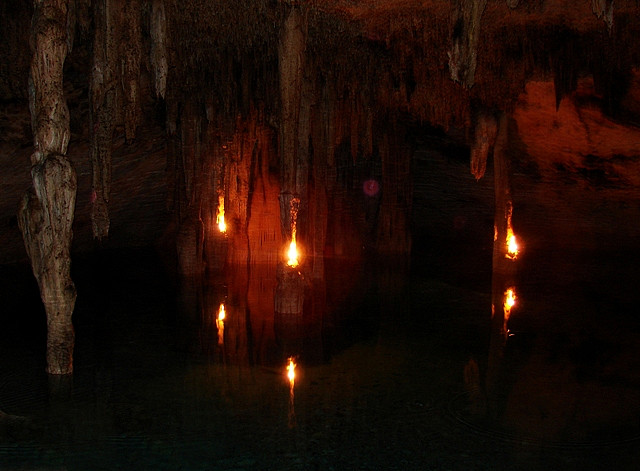
Cenote Papak'al, cavern, Eknakán, Yucatán
