= Hacienda Dzibikak =

- Private Residence / Event Venue
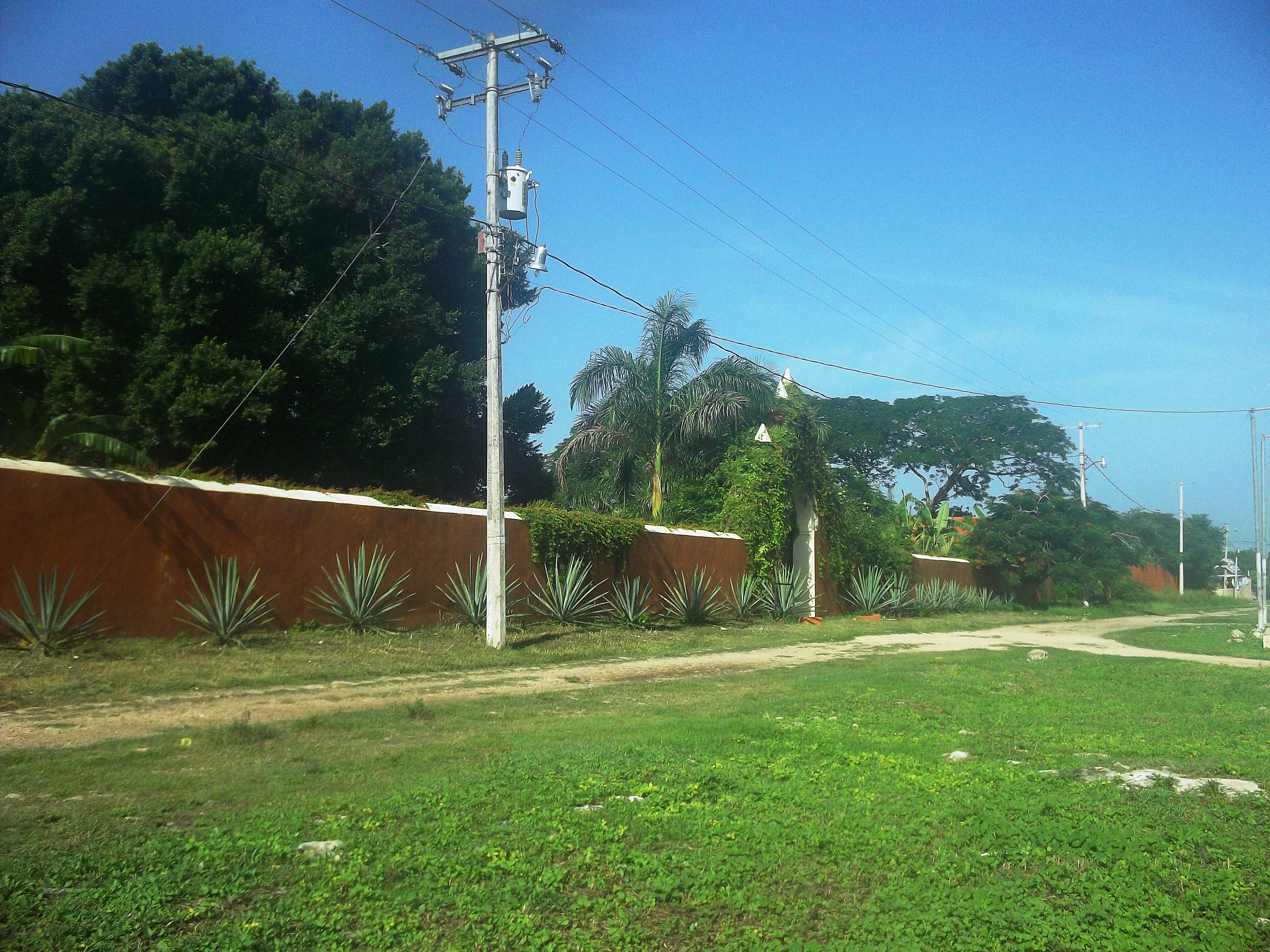
- Entrance to Hacienda Dzibikak, Yucatán.

- Location in Mexico
- Coordinates: 20°54′09″N 89°47′39″W
- Country: Mexico
- Mexican States: Yucatán
- Municipalities: Umán Municipality
- Time zone: UTC−6 (CST)
  - Summer (DST): UTC−5 (CDT)
- Postal code: 97391
- Area code: 988

Hacienda Dzibikak is located in the Umán Municipality within the town of Umán in the state of Yucatán in southeastern Mexico. It is one of the properties that arose during the nineteenth century henequen boom.

== Toponymy ==
The name (Dzibikak) is a word from the Mayan language meaning 'written with fire'.

== How to get there ==
The property is located south of Mérida in the town of Umán.

== History ==
Dzibikak was a Mayan settlement that emerged five centuries ago as an agricultural trading center. Small settlements were planted with crops such as maize, beans and cotton to trade with the coastal towns for fish and salt. After the Spanish invasion, encomiendas were established in these settlement centers, which gave rise to the interior haciendas of the Hunucmá District.

Hacienda Dzibikak was operational in 1860 and in 1879 had a population of 231 people. The owner of Dzibikak in 1882 also owned Hacienda Sacnicté. In 1910 the hacienda had a population of between 200 and 400 people. With the decline of the sisal industry and a fire in the warehouse which collapsed the walls and ceilings, the buildings were abandoned.

In 2005, Richard and Lena Nichols purchased the ruins of Hacienda Dzibikak. They spent the next 6 years renovating the property which is now available for weddings, photo sessions, ‘quinceañeras’ or corporate events. It has hosted a ballet with 300 attendees and is the location for the annual Mérida Music Festival.

== Demographics ==
All of the henequen plantations ceased to exist as autonomous communities with the agrarian land reform implemented by President Lazaro Cardenas in 1937. His decree turned the haciendas into collective ejidos, leaving only 150 hectares to the former landowners for use as private property. Figures before 1937 indicate populations living on the farm. After 1937, figures indicate those living in the community, as the remaining Hacienda Dzibikak houses only the owner's immediate family.

A pueblo of the same name surrounds the hacienda. According to census of 2005 conducted by the INEGI, the population of the city was 1,238 inhabitants, of whom 628 were men and 610 were women; while in 2010, the INEGI reported a total of 1,388 inhabitants.

Population of Dzibikak by year
Year	1900	1910	1921	1930	1940	1950	1960	1970	1980	1990	1995	2000	2005	2010
Population	290	358	284	297	256	304	351	463	621	800	994	1,069	1,238	1,388

== Bibliography ==
- Bracamonte, P and Solís, R., Los espacios de autonomía maya, Ed. UADY, Mérida, 1997.
- Gobierno del Estado de Yucatán, "Los municipios de Yucatán", 1988.
- Kurjack, Edward y Silvia Garza, Atlas arqueológico del Estado de Yucatán, Ed. INAH, 1980.
- Patch, Robert, La formación de las estancias y haciendas en Yucatán durante la colonia, Ed. UADY, 1976.
- Peón Ancona, J. F., "Las antiguas haciendas de Yucatán", en Diario de Yucatán, Mérida, 1971.

== Photo gallery ==
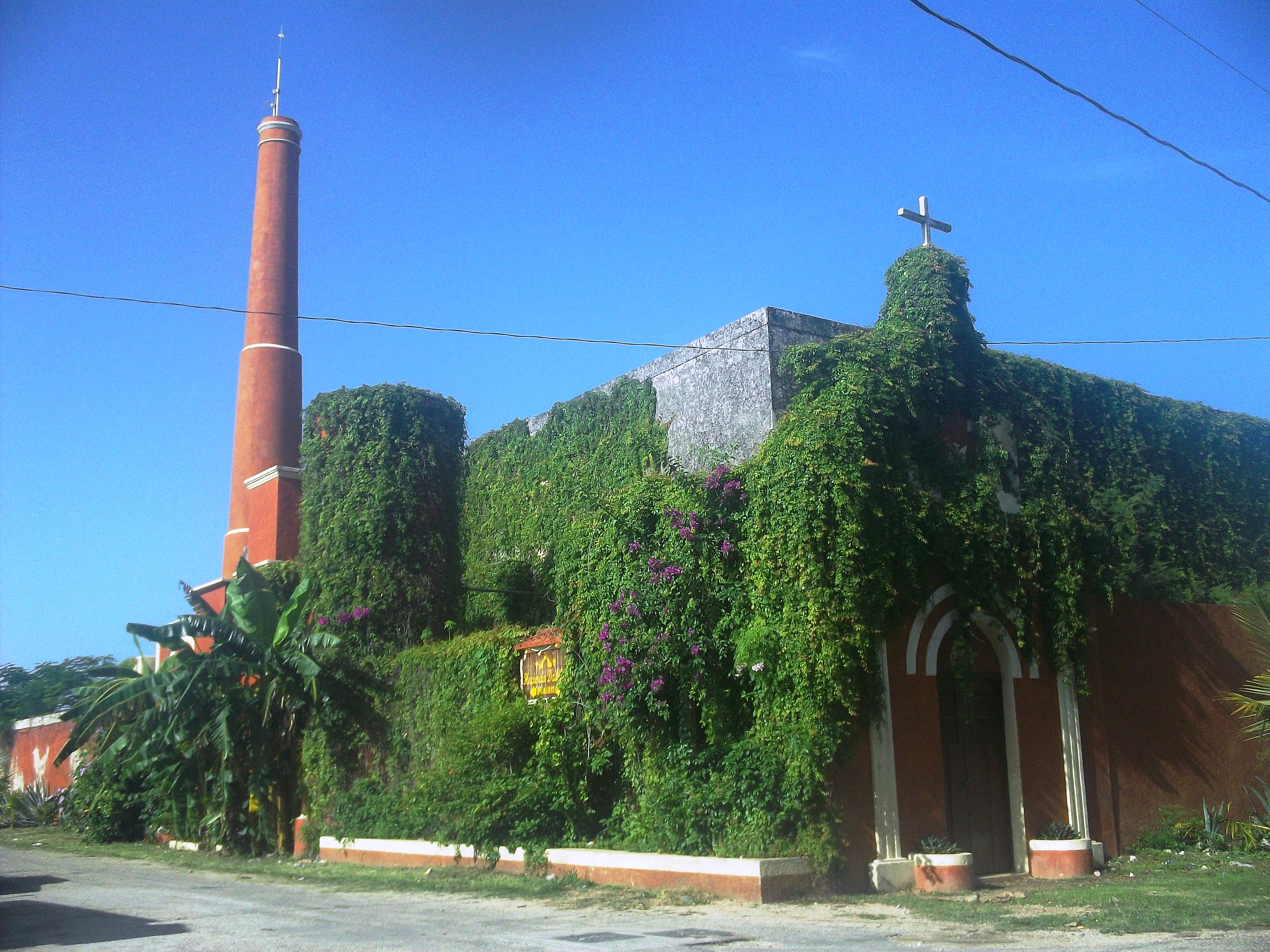
View of Hacienda Dzibikak

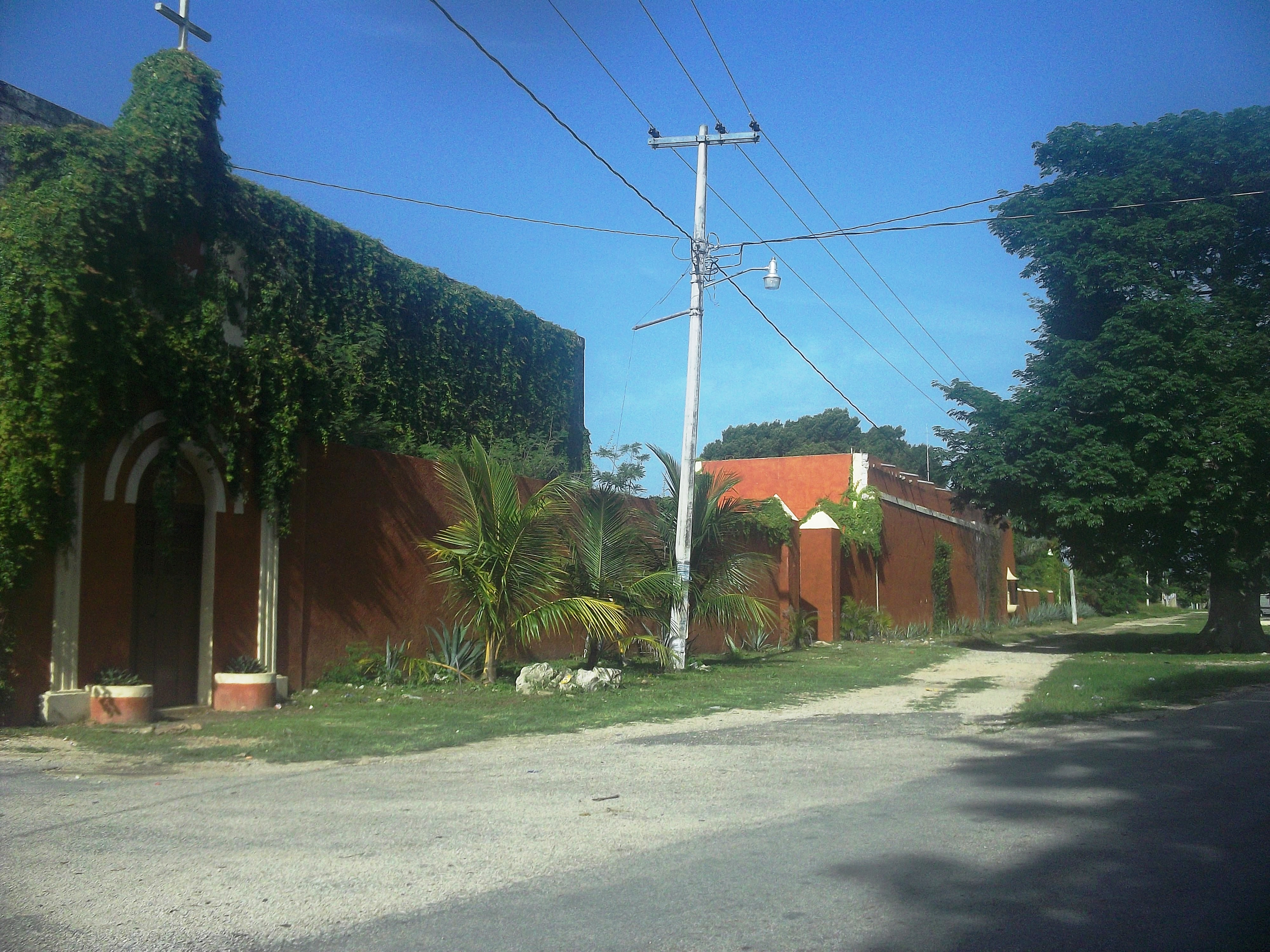
View of Hacienda Dzibikak

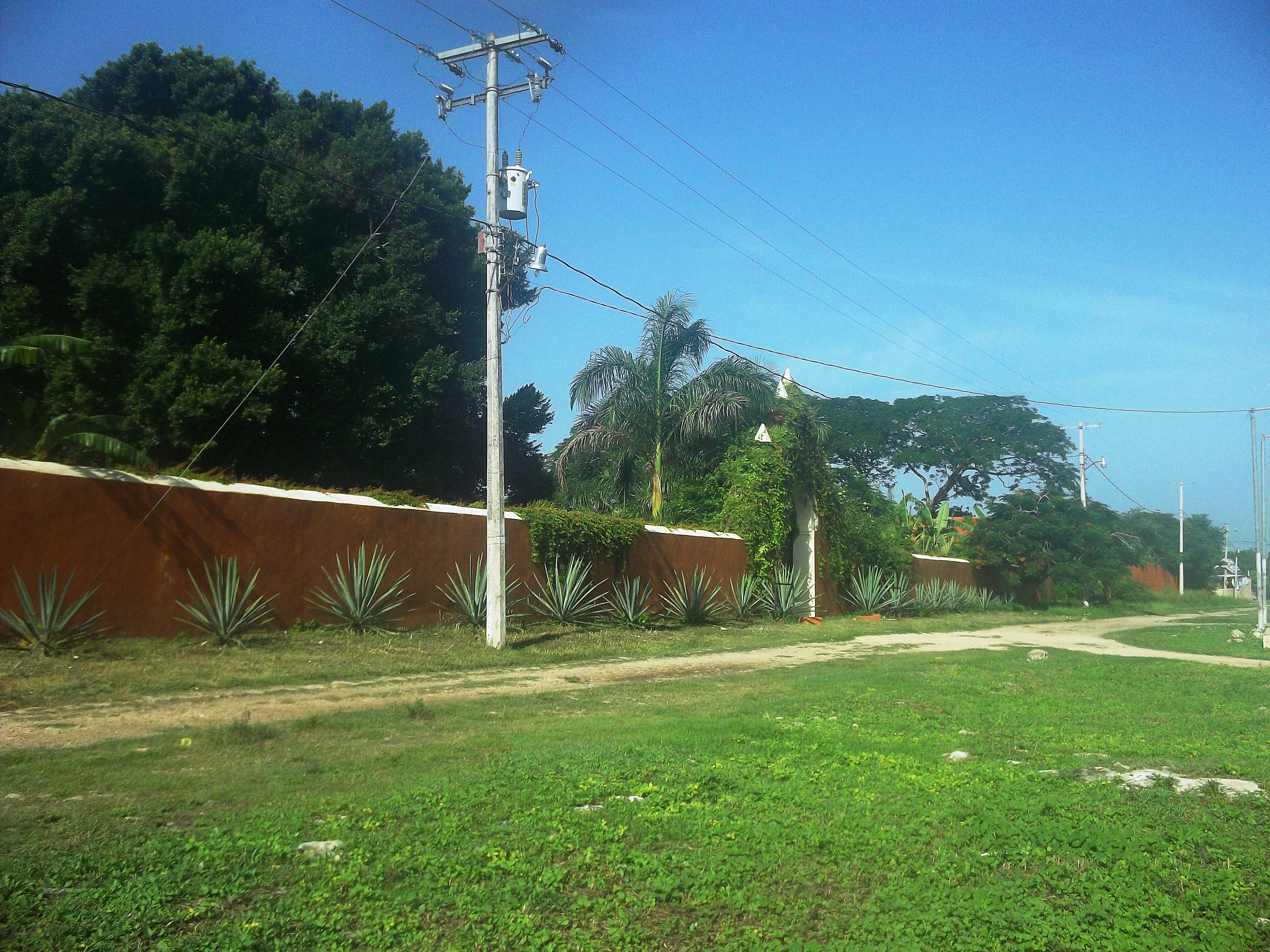
View of Hacienda Dzibikak

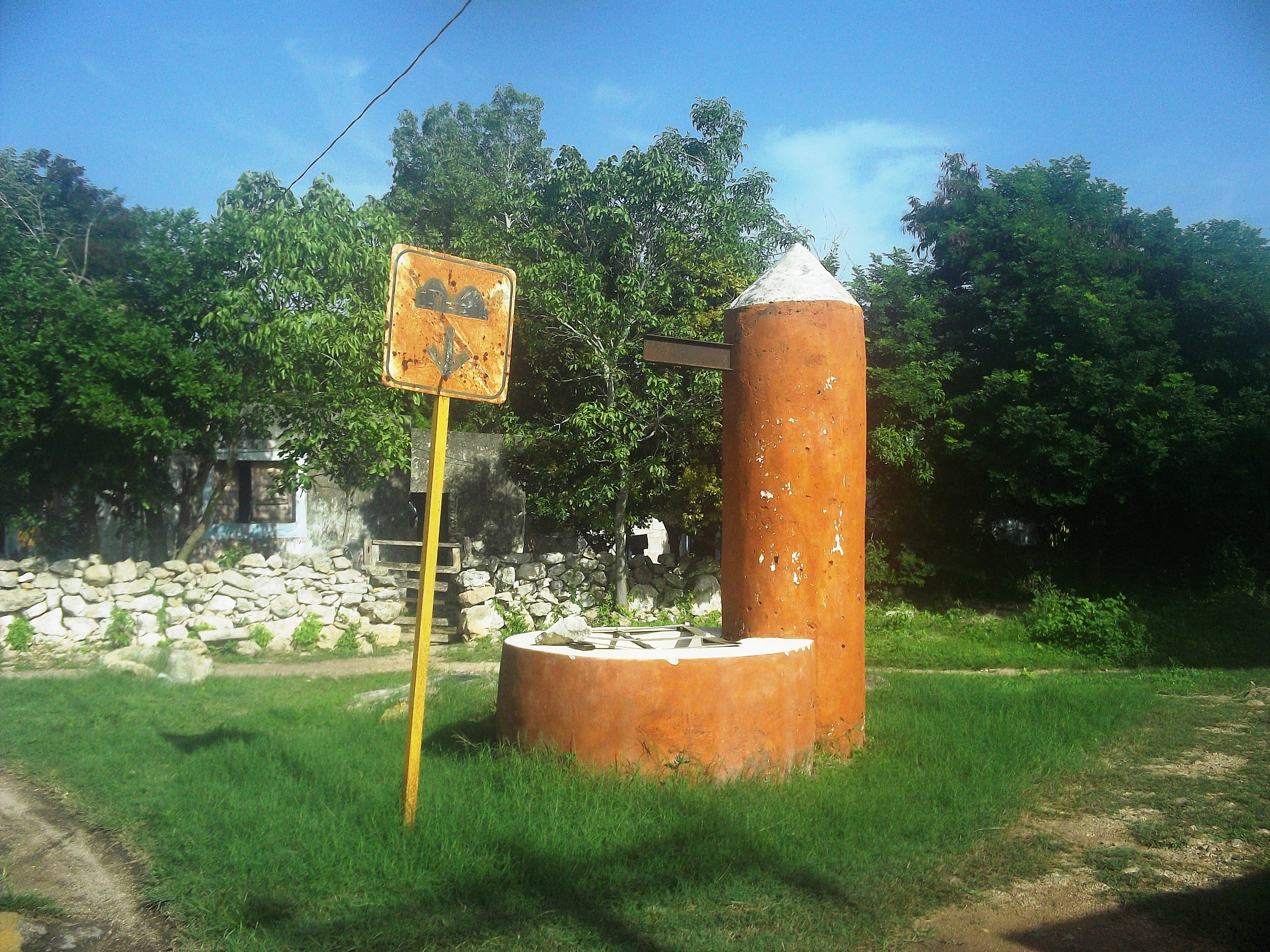
Well at Hacienda Dzibikak

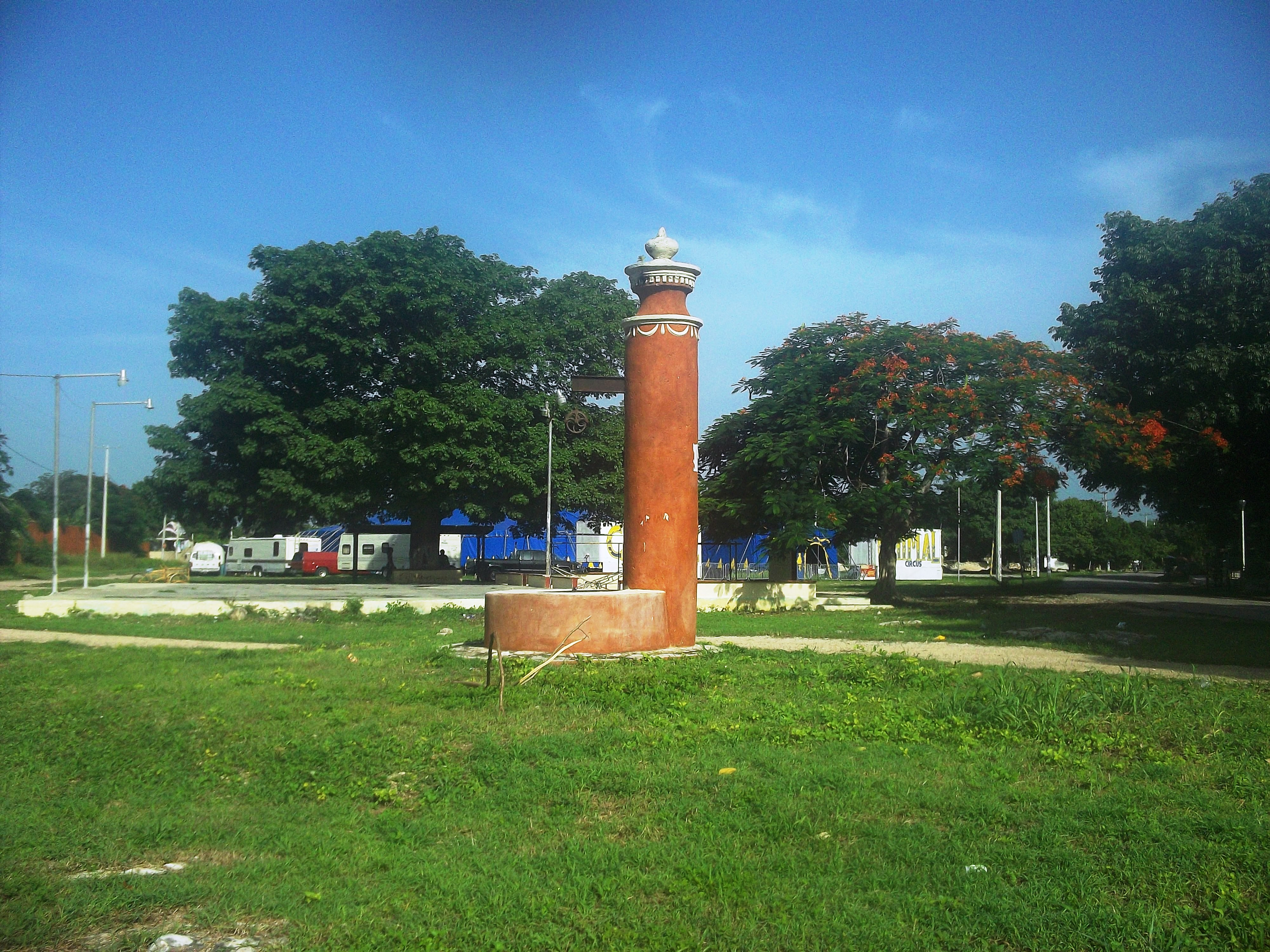
Well at Hacienda Dzibikak

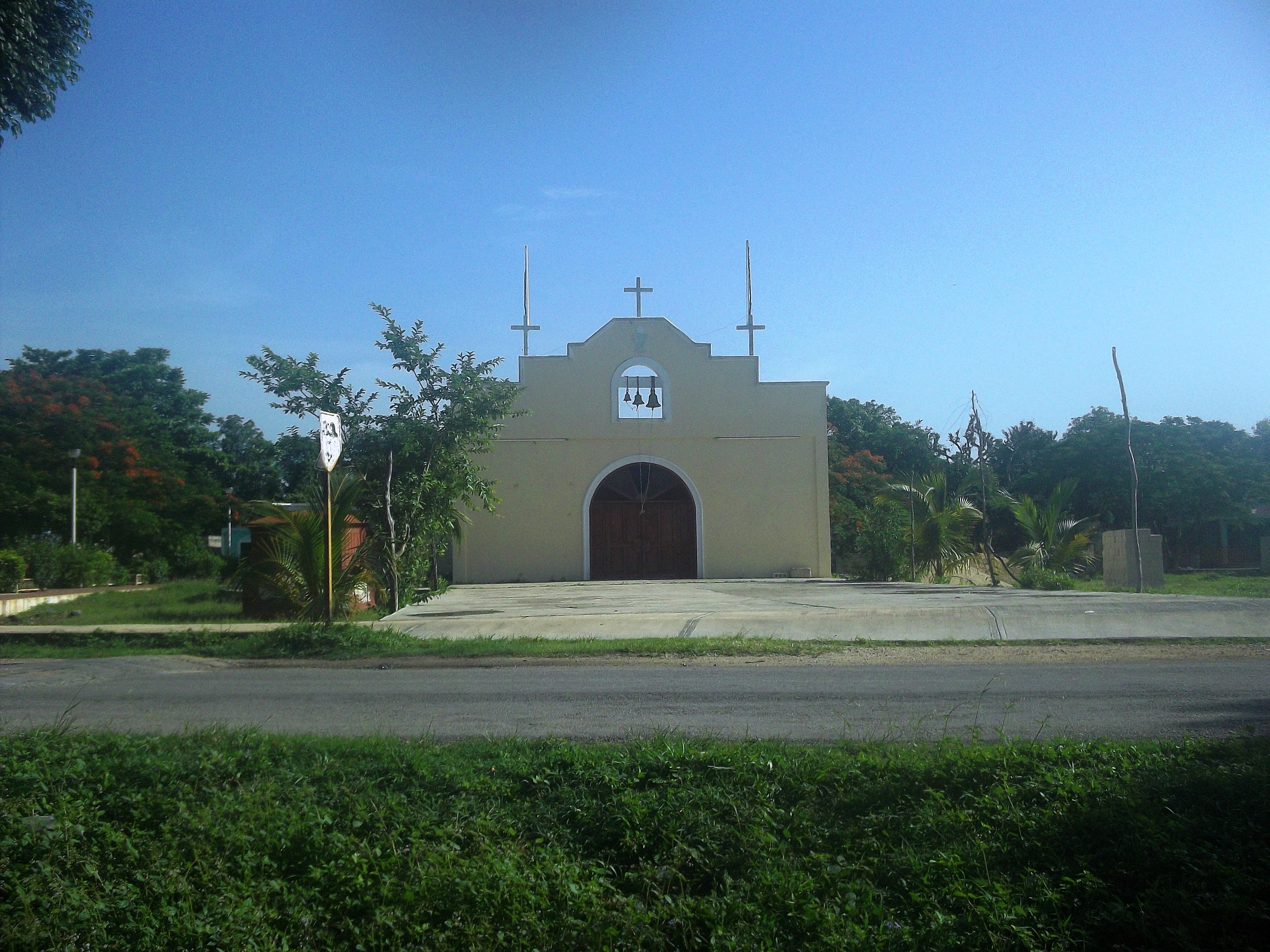
Church at Hacienda Dzibikak
