= Hacienda Santa Rosa de Lima =

Luxury hotel in Maxcanú Municipality, Yucutan, Mexico

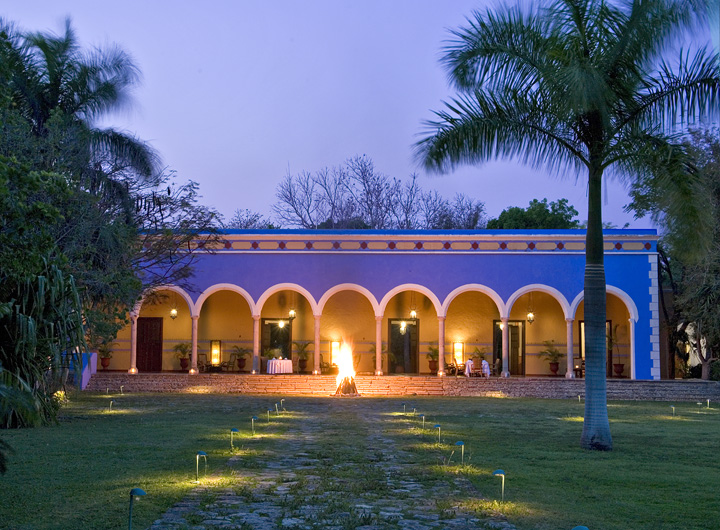
Exterior Hacienda Santa Rosa

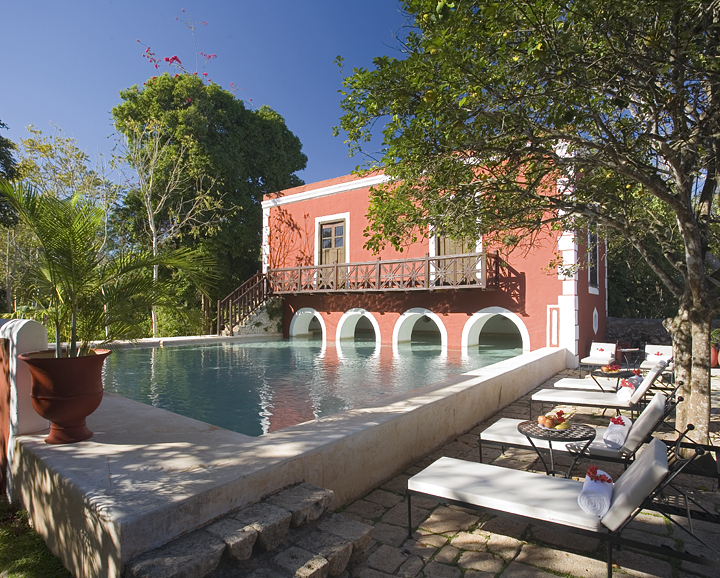
The pool

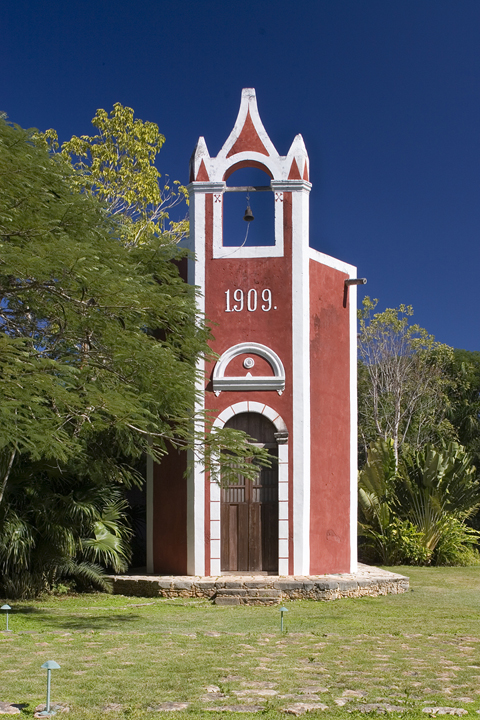
The church

Hacienda Santa Rosa de Lima is located in Maxcanú Municipality, Yucatán, Mexico, about 60 km from the city of Mérida. It is one of the properties that arose during the henequen boom, and produced sisal for many years. The property, which was largely completed in 1909, is now an exclusive luxury hotel.

== History ==
The first known owner of the estate was Benito Montero, a resident of Calkini who sold the estate that year to the brothers José Dolores and Encarnación Guzmán. In 1870 the brothers parted ways and the estate fell solely to José Dolores. There are records which mention a powerhouse with a boiler and steam motor being added. In 1886 Santa Rosa de Lima was mortgaged to Manuel Zapata Bolio for $20,000, and then acquired by José Dominguez, who had to sell it to his brother Alfredo Maria de la Trinidad in 1889 due to economic reasons. Alfredo sold it three years later to the Urcelay family, led by José Antonio Urcelay Peniche, a notable hacienda owner. In 1897 the estate had 90 people living on it, with "363 heads of cattle, 236 cows, 90 bulls, 37 calves, 29 horses (including mares) and 39 mules".

Following the land reform of 1937, which involved the expropriation of land and machinery, and then the decline in demand for natural fibers on the international market, the estate entered a period of precipitous decline; in a few years Santa Rosa de Lima saw production plummet from 3465 to just 276 hectares. It was owned by engineer Enrique Vales Monforte at the time it was taken over by a private company in 1996, which fully restored it as an exclusive luxury hotel.

== Architecture ==
The hacienda is organized, like most Mexican estates of the late nineteenth and early twentieth centuries, in an axis from north to south. The main house and the powerhouse border the main square. On one side of this square is the access path for the workers from their homes and the company store. The church and school complete the set.

The current colonial style main house, the cellars and the keeper's house, date to 1909. They feature cornices and friezes. During the second construction stage in 1916, the powerhouse was added, which also accommodated the grain shredder. Various styles can be seen in its construction, including the Renaissance and neoclassical.

The hotel suites of the hacienda all feature 18-foot ceilings with bare beams and rafters, with 10-foot-high wooden double doors. They are all furnished in dark tropical hardwoods, with tile floors. The 9.200 m² botanical garden is set amidst an old fruit plantation, and features over 200 species of plants, several of which are endemic to the Yucatán Peninsula.

== Bibliography ==
- Bracamonte, P and Solís, R., Los espacios de autonomía maya, Ed. UADY, Mérida, 1997.
- Gobierno del Estado de Yucatán, "Los municipios de Yucatán", 1988.
- Kurjack, Edward y Silvia Garza, Atlas arqueológico del Estado de Yucatán, Ed. INAH, 1980.
- Patch, Robert, La formación de las estancias y haciendas en Yucatán durante la colonia, Ed. UADY, 1976.
- Peón Ancona, J. F., "Las antiguas haciendas de Yucatán", en Diario de Yucatán, Mérida, 1971.
