= Hacienda Dzoyolá =

- Private Residence / Event Venue
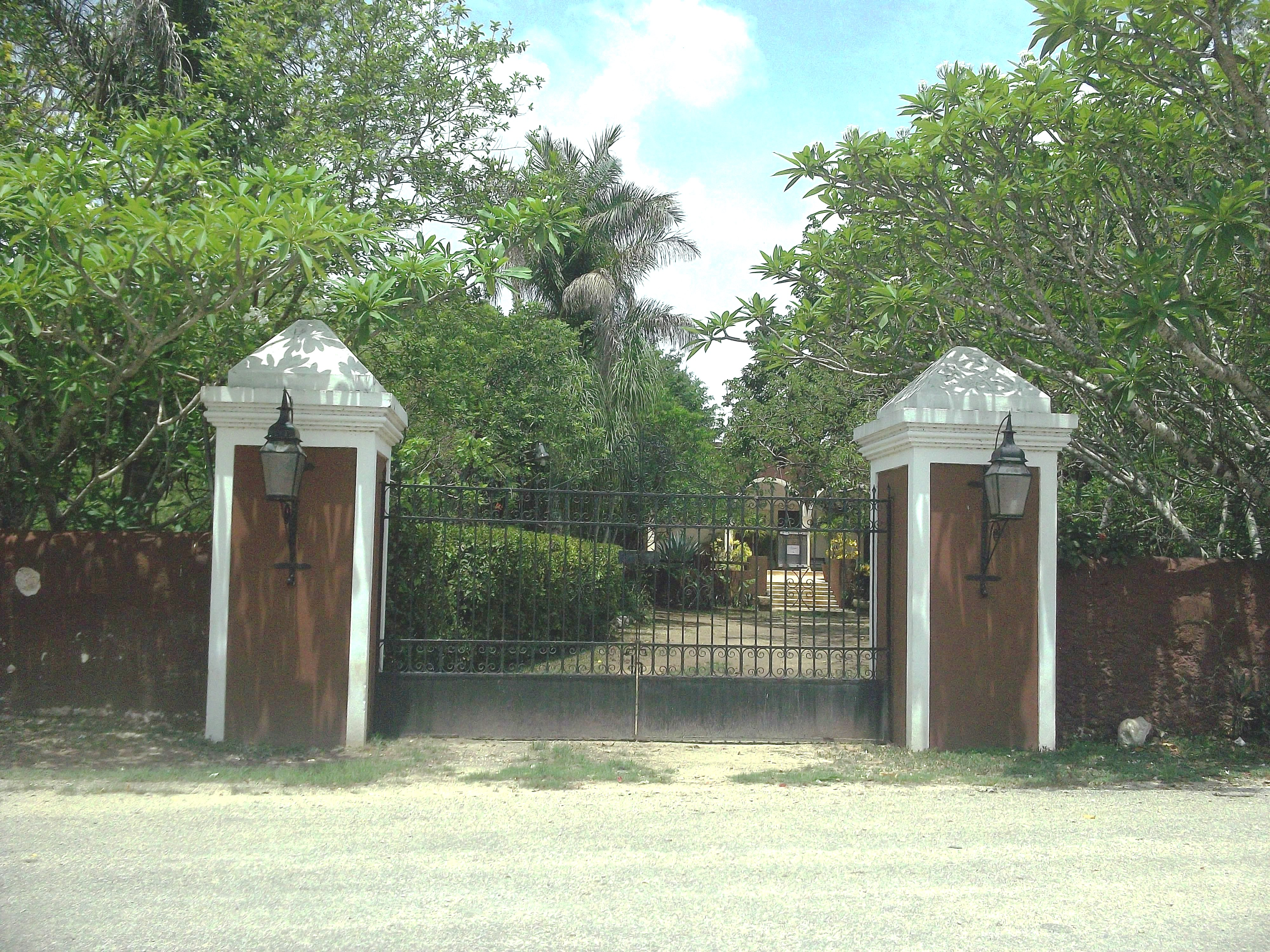
- Entrance

- Location in Mexico
- Coordinates: 20°54′10″N 89°35′07″W
- Country: Mexico
- Mexican States: Yucatán
- Municipalities: Mérida Municipality
- Time zone: UTC−6 (CST)
  - Summer (DST): UTC−5 (CDT)
- Postal code: 97370
- Area code: 999

Hacienda Dzoyolá is located in the Mérida Municipality in the state of Yucatán in southeastern Mexico. It is one of the properties that arose during the nineteenth century henequen boom.

== Toponymy ==
The name (Dzoyolá) is a word from the Mayan language meaning where the water flows.

== How to get there ==
Take Calle 42 south from Mérida crossing the Periférico and continuing approximately 2 km. Turn left onto Calle 29 and proceed approximately 2 km to the hacienda.

== History ==
Hacienda Dzoyolá was originally built in 1750, but damaged by fire. It was rebuilt and damaged again during the Caste War of Yucatán in the nineteenth century. It was originally used as a livestock ranch and has long been associated with bee keeping. In 2008 the Maya Beekeeping Society of Yucatán opened a honey processing plant near the hacienda.

== Architecture ==
Due to deterioration, the hacienda was completely refurbished in a traditional style. It has 2 large bedrooms, a dining room, multiple terraces and colorful gardens. There is a shrine to honor San Cosme, patron saint of the hacienda.

This Hacienda is available for private events and photography sessions.

== Bibliography ==
- Bracamonte, P and Solís, R., Los espacios de autonomía maya, Ed. UADY, Mérida, 1997.
- Gobierno del Estado de Yucatán, "Los municipios de Yucatán", 1988.
- Kurjack, Edward y Silvia Garza, Atlas arqueológico del Estado de Yucatán, Ed. INAH, 1980.
- Patch, Robert, La formación de las estancias y haciendas en Yucatán durante la colonia, Ed. UADY, 1976.
- Peón Ancona, J. F., "Las antiguas haciendas de Yucatán", en Diario de Yucatán, Mérida, 1971.
