= Kankabchén =

Kankabchén may refer to the following places in Mexico:

- Hacienda Kancabchén, Yucatán
- Hacienda Kancabchén (Halachó), Yucatán
- Hacienda Kancabchén (Homún), Yucatán
- Hacienda Kancabchén (Motul), Yucatán
- Hacienda Kancabchén (Tunkás), Yucatán
- Hacienda Kancabchén Ucí, Yucatán
- Hacienda Kancabchén de Valencia, Yucatán
- Hacienda Kankabchén (Seyé), Yucatán
- Hacienda Kankabchén (Tixkokob), Yucatán

== See also ==
- Hacienda Kankabchén (disambiguation)
