= Hacienda Kancabchén =

Hacienda Kancabchén or Hacienda Kankabchén may refer to the following places in Yucatán, Mexico:

- Hacienda Kancabchén (Baca)
- Hacienda Kancabchén (Halachó)
- Hacienda Kancabchén (Homún)
- Hacienda Kancabchén (Motul)
- Hacienda Kancabchén (Tunkás)
- Hacienda Kancabchén Ucí
- Hacienda Kancabchén de Valencia
- Hacienda Kankabchén (Seyé)
- Hacienda Kankabchén (Tixkokob)
