= Hacienda Kancabchén (Tunkás) =

- Location in Mexico
- Coordinates: 20°55′13″N 88°48′53″W
- Country: Mexico
- Mexican States: Yucatán
- Municipalities: Tunkás
- Time zone: UTC−6 (CST)
  - Summer (DST): UTC−5 (CDT)
- Postal code: 97650
- Area code: 991

Hacienda Kancabchén is located in the Tunkás Municipality in the state of Yucatán in southeastern Mexico. It is one of the properties that arose during the nineteenth century henequen boom. There are numerous other properties of this name in the Yucatán including Hacienda Kancabchén in Baca, Hacienda Kancabchén (Halachó), Hacienda Kancabchén (Homún), Hacienda Kancabchén (Motul), Hacienda Kankabchén (Seyé), Hacienda Kankabchén (Tixkokob), Hacienda Kancabchén Ucí and Hacienda Kancabchén de Valencia.

== Toponymy ==
The name (Kancabchén) is a word from the Mayan language meaning the well of the red ground.

== How to get there ==
Travel east out of Mérida towards Valladolid on México 180 approximately 90 km. Turn left and head north approximately 2 km to Hacienda Kancabchén.

== Demographics ==
All of the henequen plantations ceased to exist as autonomous communities with the agrarian land reform implemented by President Lazaro Cardenas in 1937. His decree turned the haciendas into collective ejidos, leaving only 150 hectares to the former landowners for use as private property. Figures before 1937 indicate populations living on the farm. After 1937, figures indicate those living in the community, as the remaining Hacienda Kancabchén houses only the owner's immediate family.

According to the 2005 census conducted by the INEGI, there was no permanent population in the location.

Population of Kancabchén by year
Year	1900	1910	1921	1930	1940	1950	1960	1970	1980	1990	1995	2000	2005
Population	166	207	69	39	31	11	3	33	20	13	10	?	0

== Bibliography ==
- Bracamonte, P and Solís, R., Los espacios de autonomía maya, Ed. UADY, Mérida, 1997.
- Gobierno del Estado de Yucatán, "Los municipios de Yucatán", 1988.
- Kurjack, Edward y Silvia Garza, Atlas arqueológico del Estado de Yucatán, Ed. INAH, 1980.
- Patch, Robert, La formación de las estancias y haciendas en Yucatán durante la colonia, Ed. UADY, 1976.
- Peón Ancona, J. F., "Las antiguas haciendas de Yucatán", en Diario de Yucatán, Mérida, 1971.
