= Hacienda Kancabchén de Valencia =

- Location in Mexico
- Coordinates: 20°43′29″N 88°51′02″W
- Country: Mexico
- Mexican States: Yucatán
- Municipalities: Sudzal
- Time zone: UTC−6 (CST)
  - Summer (DST): UTC−5 (CDT)
- Postal code: 97678
- Area code: 991

Hacienda Kancabchén de Valencia is located in the Sudzal Municipality in the state of Yucatán in southeastern Mexico. It is one of the properties that arose during the nineteenth century henequen boom. There are numerous other properties of this name in the Yucatán including Hacienda Kancabchén in Baca, Hacienda Kancabchén (Halachó), Hacienda Kancabchén (Homún), Hacienda Kancabchén (Motul), Hacienda Kankabchén (Seyé), Hacienda Kankabchén (Tixkokob), Hacienda Kancabchén (Tunkás) and Hacienda Kancabchén Ucí.

== Toponymy ==
The name (Kancabchén) is a word from the Mayan language meaning the well of the red ground. Valencia is a city in Spain.

== History ==
In 1940, the name was changed from Kancabchén to Kancabchén de Valencia and it changed from the Municipality of Izamal to the Municipality of Sudzal.

== Demographics ==
All of the henequen plantations ceased to exist as autonomous communities with the agrarian land reform implemented by President Lazaro Cardenas in 1937. His decree turned the haciendas into collective ejidos, leaving only 150 hectares to the former landowners for use as private property. Figures before 1937 indicate populations living on the farm. After 1937, figures indicate those living in the community, as the remaining Hacienda Kancabchén de Valencia houses only the owner's immediate family.

According to the 2005 census conducted by the INEGI, the population of the city was 26 inhabitants, of whom 16 were men and 10 were women.

Population of Kancabchén de Valencia by year
Year	1900	1910	1921	1930	1940	1950	1960	1970	1980	1990	1995	2000	2005
Population	77	48	4	17	53	75	105	106	60	20	36	35	26

== Bibliography ==
- Bracamonte, P and Solís, R., Los espacios de autonomía maya, Ed. UADY, Mérida, 1997.
- Gobierno del Estado de Yucatán, "Los municipios de Yucatán", 1988.
- Kurjack, Edward y Silvia Garza, Atlas arqueológico del Estado de Yucatán, Ed. INAH, 1980.
- Patch, Robert, La formación de las estancias y haciendas en Yucatán durante la colonia, Ed. UADY, 1976.
- Peón Ancona, J. F., "Las antiguas haciendas de Yucatán", en Diario de Yucatán, Mérida, 1971.
