= Hacienda Kancabchén Ucí =

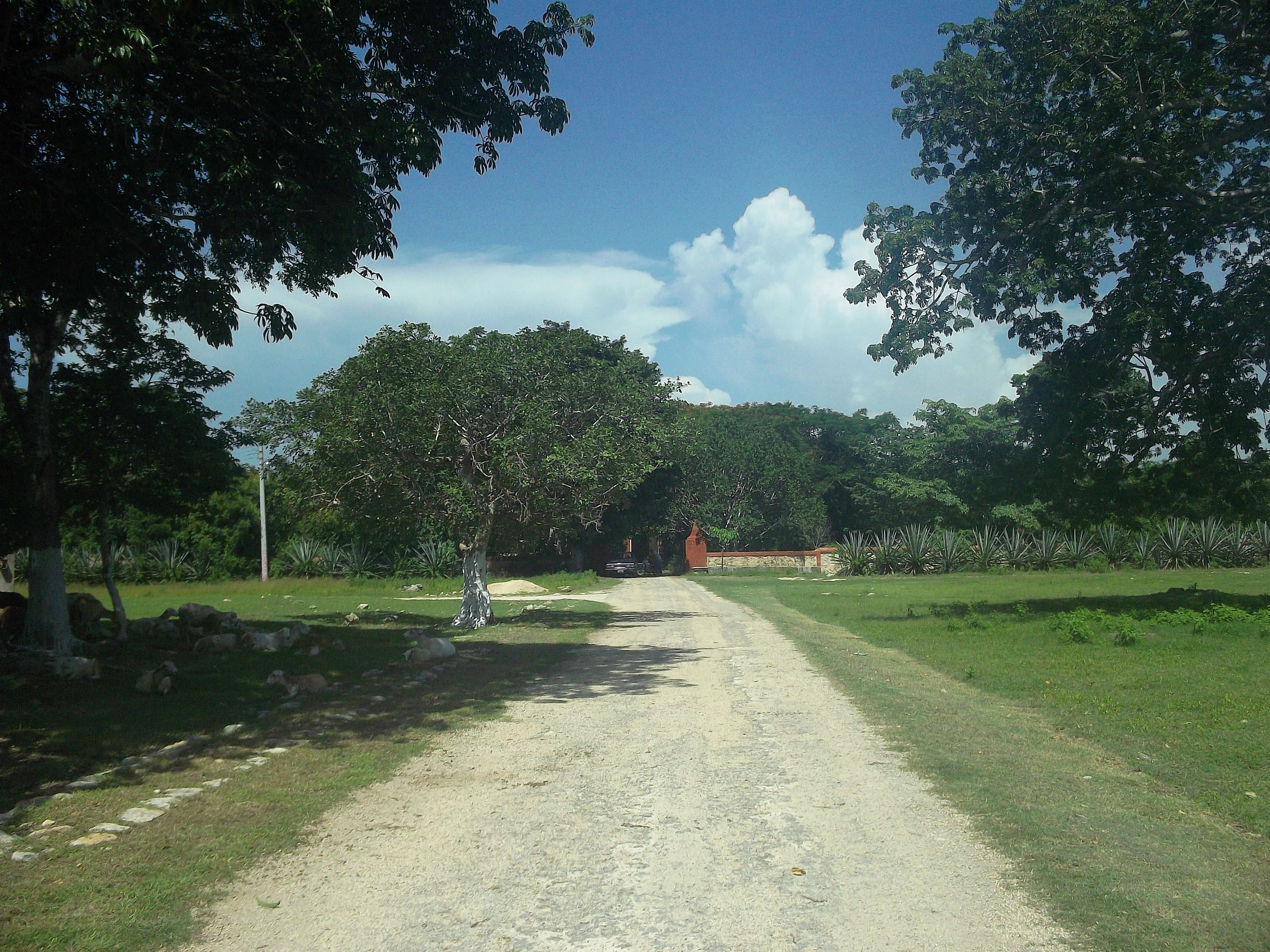
- Principal park at Hacienda Kancabchén Ucí

- Location in Mexico
- Coordinates: 21°10′12″N 89°14′25″W
- Country: Mexico
- Mexican States: Yucatán
- Municipalities: Motul
- Time zone: UTC−6 (CST)
  - Summer (DST): UTC−5 (CDT)
- Postal code: 97440
- Area code: 991

Hacienda Kancabchén Ucí is located in the Motul Municipality in the state of Yucatán in southeastern Mexico. It is one of the properties that arose during the nineteenth century henequen boom. There are numerous other properties of this name in the Yucatán including Hacienda Kancabchén in Baca, Hacienda Kancabchén (Halachó), Hacienda Kancabchén (Homún), Hacienda Kancabchén (Motul), Hacienda Kankabchén (Seyé), Hacienda Kankabchén (Tixkokob), Hacienda Kancabchén (Tunkás) and Hacienda Kancabchén de Valencia.

== Toponymy ==
The name (Kancabchén) is a word from the Mayan language meaning the well of the red ground. Ucí means seven, thus the name of the place is the seventh well of the red ground.

== How to get there ==
Take highway 176 northeast out of Mérida toward Mutul approximately 45 km (28 mi). The Kancabchén hacienda is located on the road to Motul toward Telchac Pueblo, near a ranch called Kobchen. The only way to get there is to walk or take a bicycle the 4 km (2.5 mi) to the farm.

== History ==
Early records indicate that the owner of the property was Benita Palma Barroso de Campos, who inherited 8 haciendas from her husband Roque Jacinto Campos Marrufo.

In modern history, some sources show the owner of the hacienda as Aru, others show it as Domingo Ku. Until the 1950s, the farm was dedicated to the production and cultivation of henequen. It closed and the equipment was unused until the 1980s when part of it was purchased by an entrepreneur from Mérida, who planted trees to utilize the factory equipment for processing limes. The first harvests began in the 1990s and production was steady until a 2002 hurricane destroyed that season's crop. In 2003 Coca-Cola purchased the estate and began replanting lime trees. The first harvests began in 2010.

== Demographics ==
All of the henequen plantations ceased to exist as autonomous communities with the agrarian land reform implemented by President Lazaro Cardenas in 1937. His decree turned the haciendas into collective ejidos, leaving only 150 hectares (370 acres) to the former landowners for use as private property. Figures before 1937 indicate populations living on the farm. After 1937, figures indicate those living in the community, as the remaining Hacienda Kancabchén Ucí houses only the owner's immediate family.

According to the 2005 census conducted by the INEGI, the population of the city was 96 inhabitants, of whom 55 were men and 41 were women.

Population of Kancabchén Ucí by year
Year	1900	1910	1921	1930	1940	1950	1960	1970	1980	1990	1995	2000	2005
Population	126	233	91	124	96	81	71	91	95	88	85	101	96

== Bibliography ==
- Bracamonte, P and Solís, R., Los espacios de autonomía maya, Ed. UADY, Mérida, 1997.
- Gobierno del Estado de Yucatán, "Los municipios de Yucatán", 1988.
- Kurjack, Edward y Silvia Garza, Atlas arqueológico del Estado de Yucatán, Ed. INAH, 1980.
- Patch, Robert, La formación de las estancias y haciendas en Yucatán durante la colonia, Ed. UADY, 1976.
- Peón Ancona, J. F., "Las antiguas haciendas de Yucatán", en Diario de Yucatán, Mérida, 1971.

== Photo gallery ==
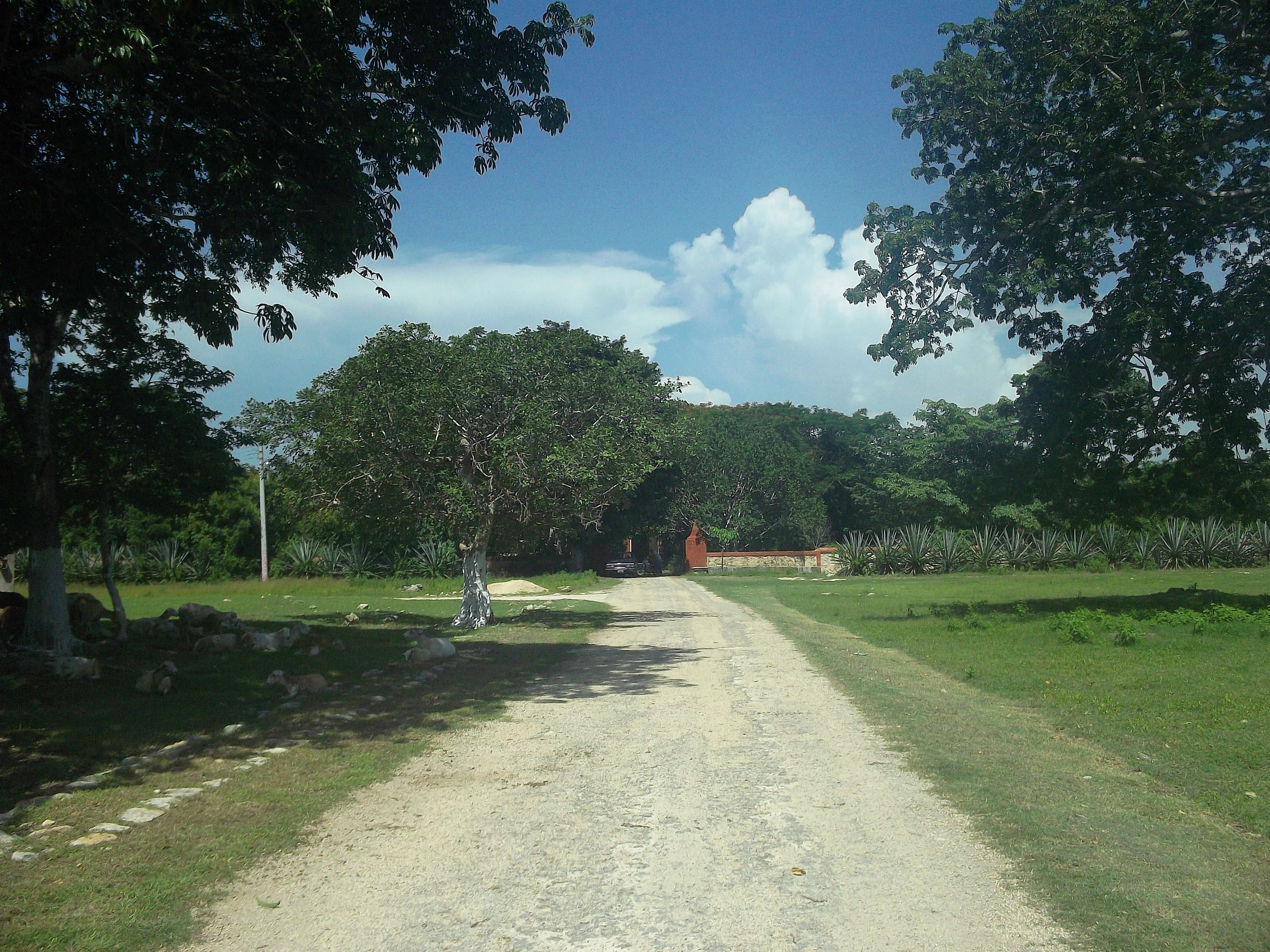
Kancabchén Ucí, Yucatán entrance

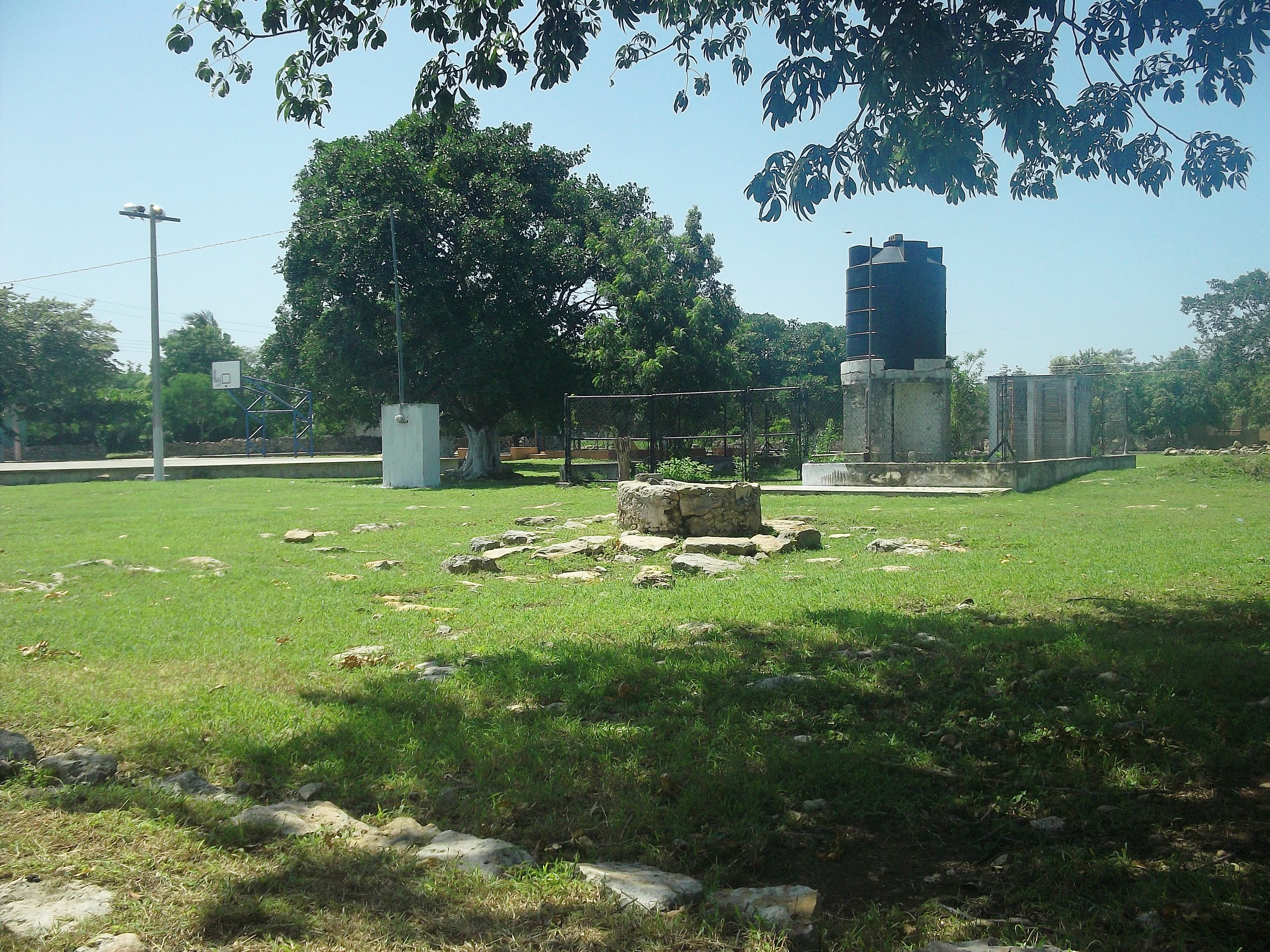
Kancabchén Ucí, Yucatán park
