= Hacienda Kankabchén (Seyé) =

- Location in Mexico
- Coordinates: 20°50′58″N 89°19′46″W
- Country: Mexico
- Mexican States: Yucatán
- Municipalities: Seyé
- Time zone: UTC−6 (CST)
  - Summer (DST): UTC−5 (CDT)
- Postal code: 97570
- Area code: 988

Hacienda Kankabchén is located in the Seyé Municipality in the state of Yucatán in southeastern Mexico. It is one of the properties that arose during the nineteenth century henequen boom. There are numerous other properties of this name in the Yucatán including Hacienda Kancabchén in Baca, Hacienda Kancabchén (Halachó), Hacienda Kancabchén (Homún), Hacienda Kancabchén (Motul), Hacienda Kankabchén (Tixkokob), Hacienda Kancabchén (Tunkás), Hacienda Kancabchén Ucí and Hacienda Kancabchén de Valencia.

== Toponymy ==
The name (Kancabchén) is a word from the Mayan language meaning the well of the red ground.

== How to get there ==
Follow highway 180 east out of Mérida toward Valladolid for approximately 24 km. Turn right and head south to Seyé, approximately 6.5 km. Go north on Calle 26 approximately 2 km and turn right heading east toward Hacienda Kancabchén. In approximately 3 km, the property will be on the right hand side.

== Demographics ==
All of the henequen plantations ceased to exist as autonomous communities with the agrarian land reform implemented by President Lazaro Cardenas in 1937. His decree turned the haciendas into collective ejidos, leaving only 150 hectares to the former landowners for use as private property. Figures before 1937 indicate populations living on the farm. After 1937, figures indicate those living in the community, as the remaining Hacienda Kankabchén houses only the owner's immediate family.

According to the 2005 census conducted by the INEGI, there were no permanent inhabitants of the hamlet.

Population of Kankabchén by year
Year	1990	1995	2000	2005
Population	0	0	0	0

== Bibliography ==
- Bracamonte, P and Solís, R., Los espacios de autonomía maya, Ed. UADY, Mérida, 1997.
- Gobierno del Estado de Yucatán, "Los municipios de Yucatán", 1988.
- Kurjack, Edward y Silvia Garza, Atlas arqueológico del Estado de Yucatán, Ed. INAH, 1980.
- Patch, Robert, La formación de las estancias y haciendas en Yucatán durante la colonia, Ed. UADY, 1976.
- Peón Ancona, J. F., "Las antiguas haciendas de Yucatán", en Diario de Yucatán, Mérida, 1971.
