= Hacienda Kankabchén (Tixkokob) =

- Private residence
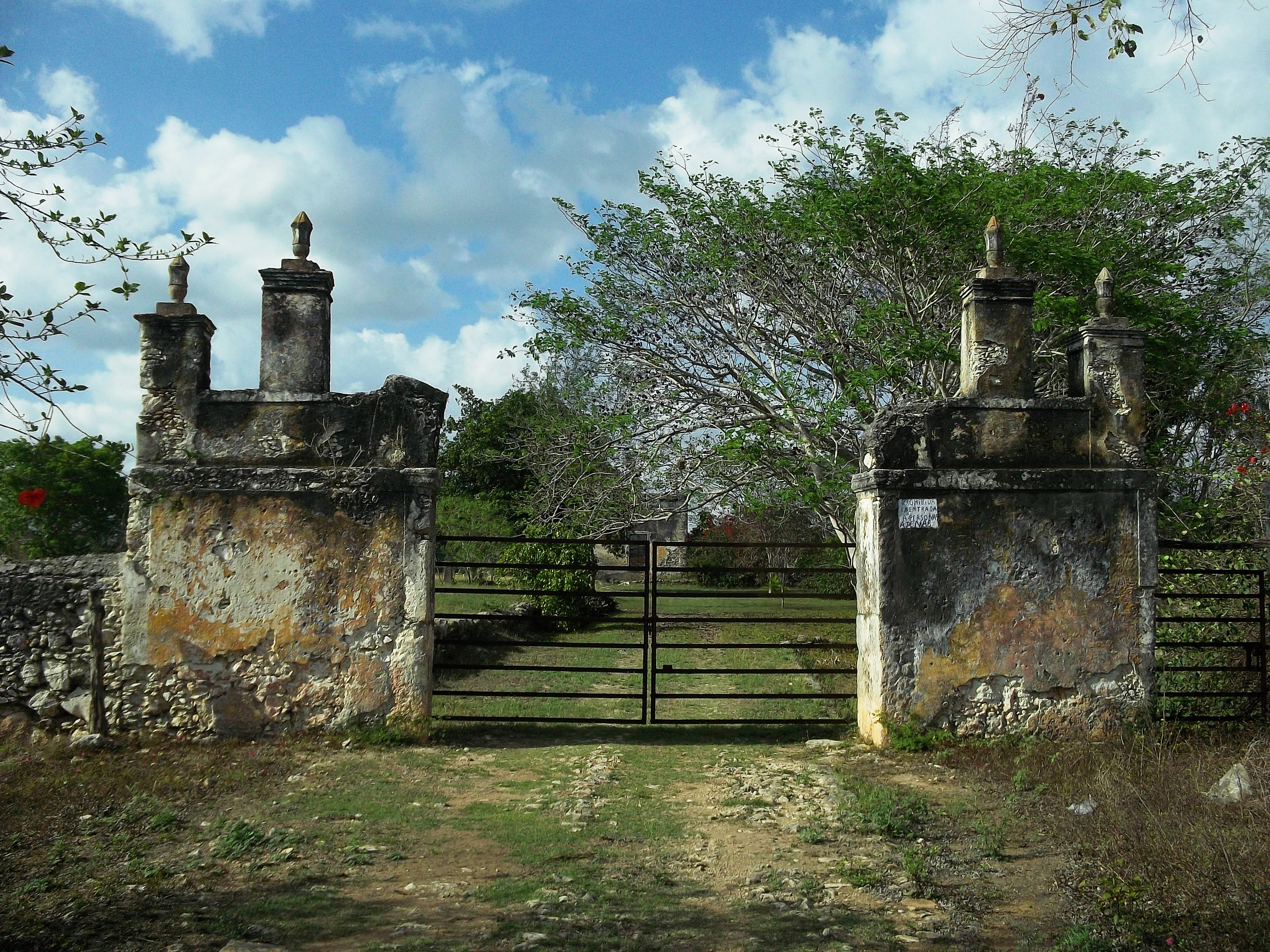
- Entrance to Hacienda Kankabchén, Tixkokob, Yucatán

- Location in Mexico
- Coordinates: 21°02′36″N 89°22′59″W
- Country: Mexico
- Mexican States: Yucatán
- Municipalities: Tixkokob
- Time zone: UTC−6 (CST)
  - Summer (DST): UTC−5 (CDT)
- Postal code: 97473
- Area code: 991

Hacienda Kankabchén is located in the Tixkokob Municipality in the state of Yucatán in southeastern Mexico. It is one of the properties that arose during the nineteenth century henequen boom. There are numerous other properties of this name in the Yucatán including Hacienda Kancabchén in Baca, Hacienda Kancabchén (Halachó), Hacienda Kancabchén (Homún), Hacienda Kancabchén (Motul), Hacienda Kankabchén (Seyé), Hacienda Kancabchén (Tunkás), Hacienda Kancabchén Ucí and Hacienda Kancabchén de Valencia.

== Toponymy ==
The name (Kancabchén) is a word from the Mayan language meaning the well of the red ground.

== How to get there ==
At the east side of Mérida, from the Periférico, take Calle 65 approximately 19 km to Tixkokob. Then go 5 km north on Calle 18 to Hacienda Kankabchén.

== Architecture ==
As is evident from photographs, the architectural structures have decayed and no habitable buildings remain.

== Demographics ==
All of the henequen plantations ceased to exist as autonomous communities with the agrarian land reform implemented by President Lazaro Cardenas in 1937. His decree turned the haciendas into collective ejidos, leaving only 150 hectares to the former landowners for use as private property. Figures before 1937 indicate populations living on the farm. After 1937, figures indicate those living in the community, as the remaining Hacienda Kankabchén houses only the owner's immediate family.

According to the 2005 census conducted by the INEGI, there is no permanent population residing in the area.

Population of Kankabchén by year
Year	1900	1910	1921	1930	1940	1950	1960	1970	1980	1990	1995	2000	2005
Population	217	268	119	121	82	86	73	93	8	?	?	0	0

== Bibliography ==
- Bracamonte, P and Solís, R., Los espacios de autonomía maya, Ed. UADY, Mérida, 1997.
- Gobierno del Estado de Yucatán, "Los municipios de Yucatán", 1988.
- Kurjack, Edward y Silvia Garza, Atlas arqueológico del Estado de Yucatán, Ed. INAH, 1980.
- Patch, Robert, La formación de las estancias y haciendas en Yucatán durante la colonia, Ed. UADY, 1976.
- Peón Ancona, J. F., "Las antiguas haciendas de Yucatán", en Diario de Yucatán, Mérida, 1971.

== Photo gallery ==
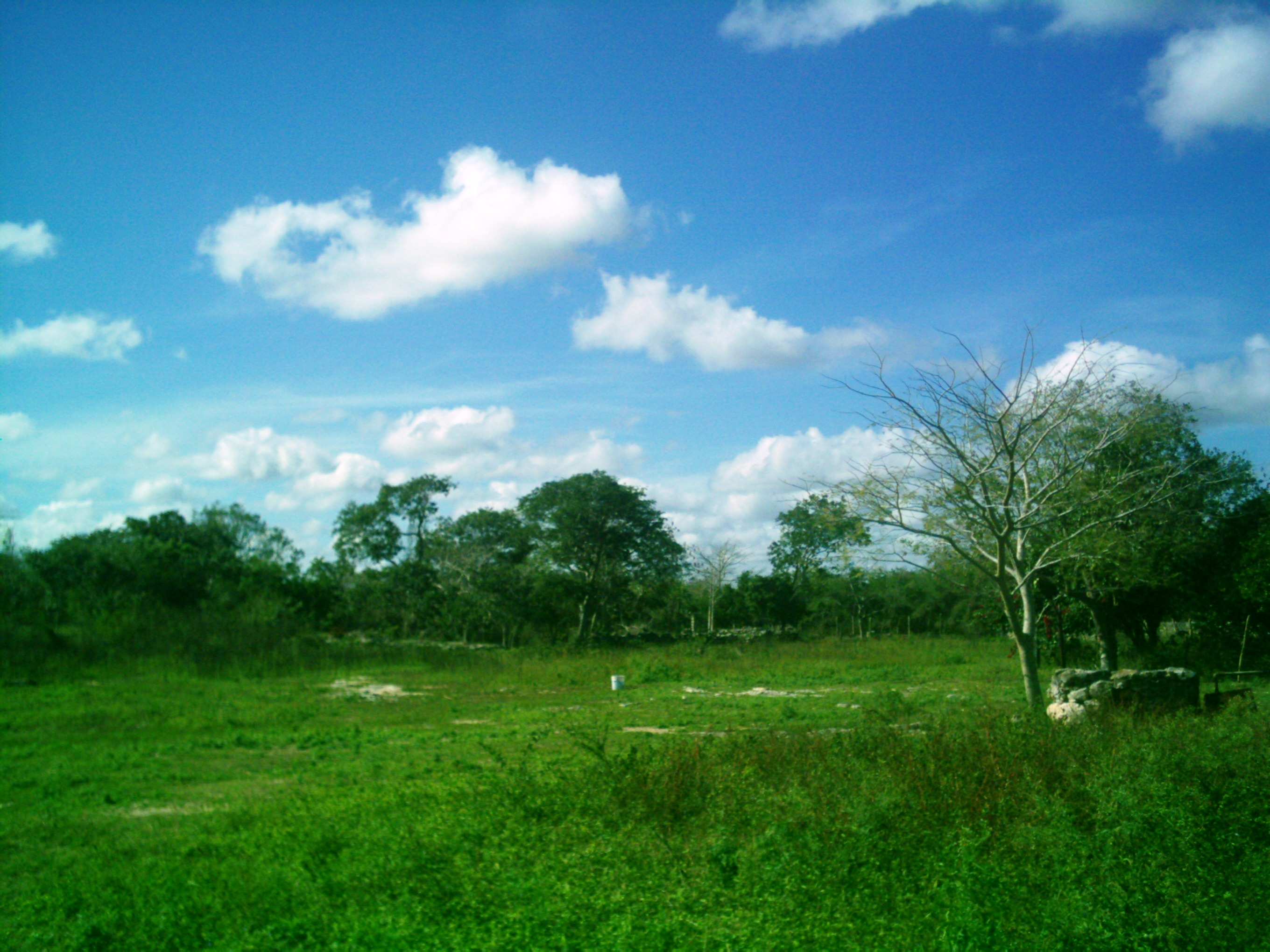
View of the Hacienda Kankabchén

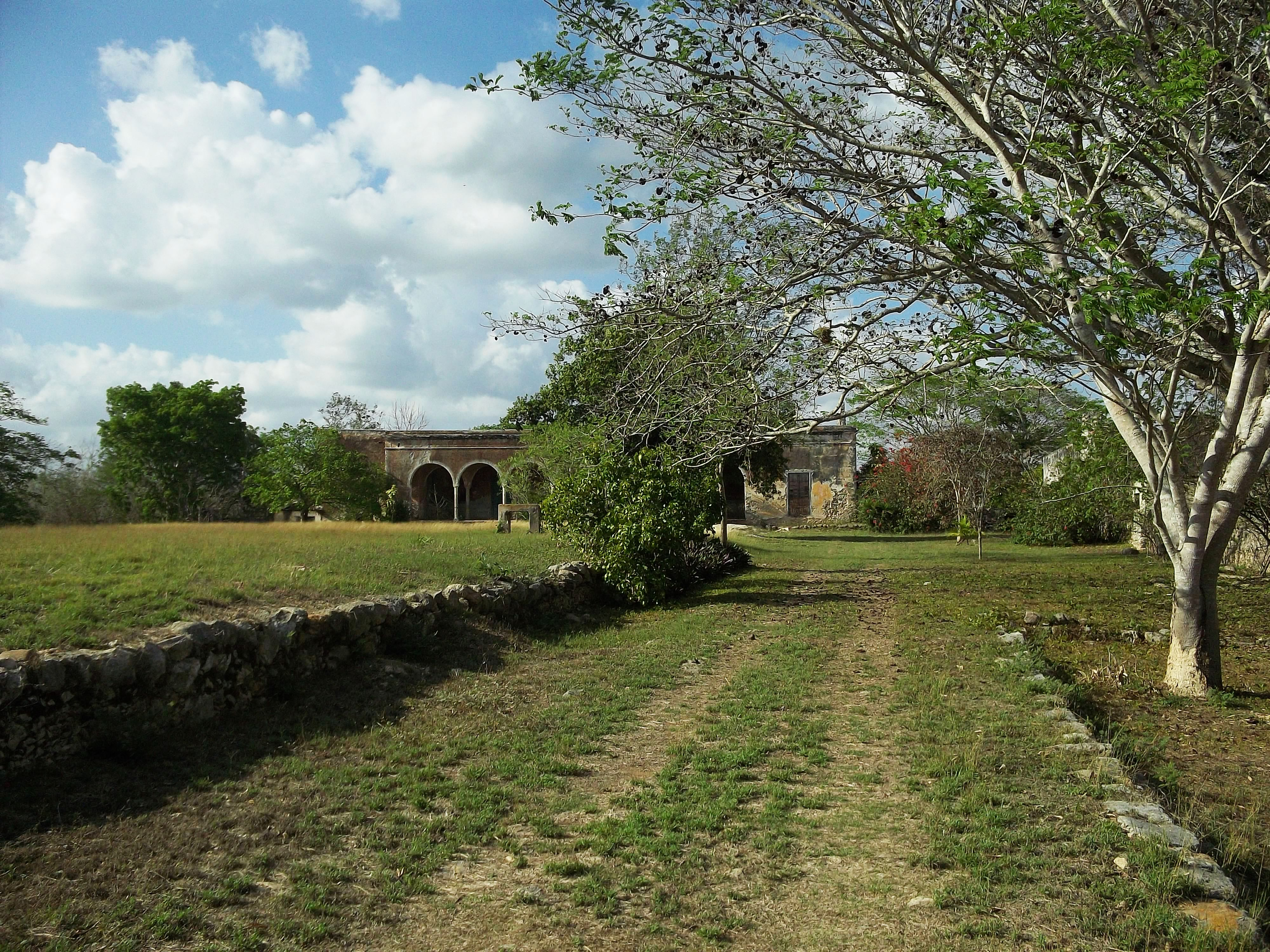
View of the Hacienda Kankabchén

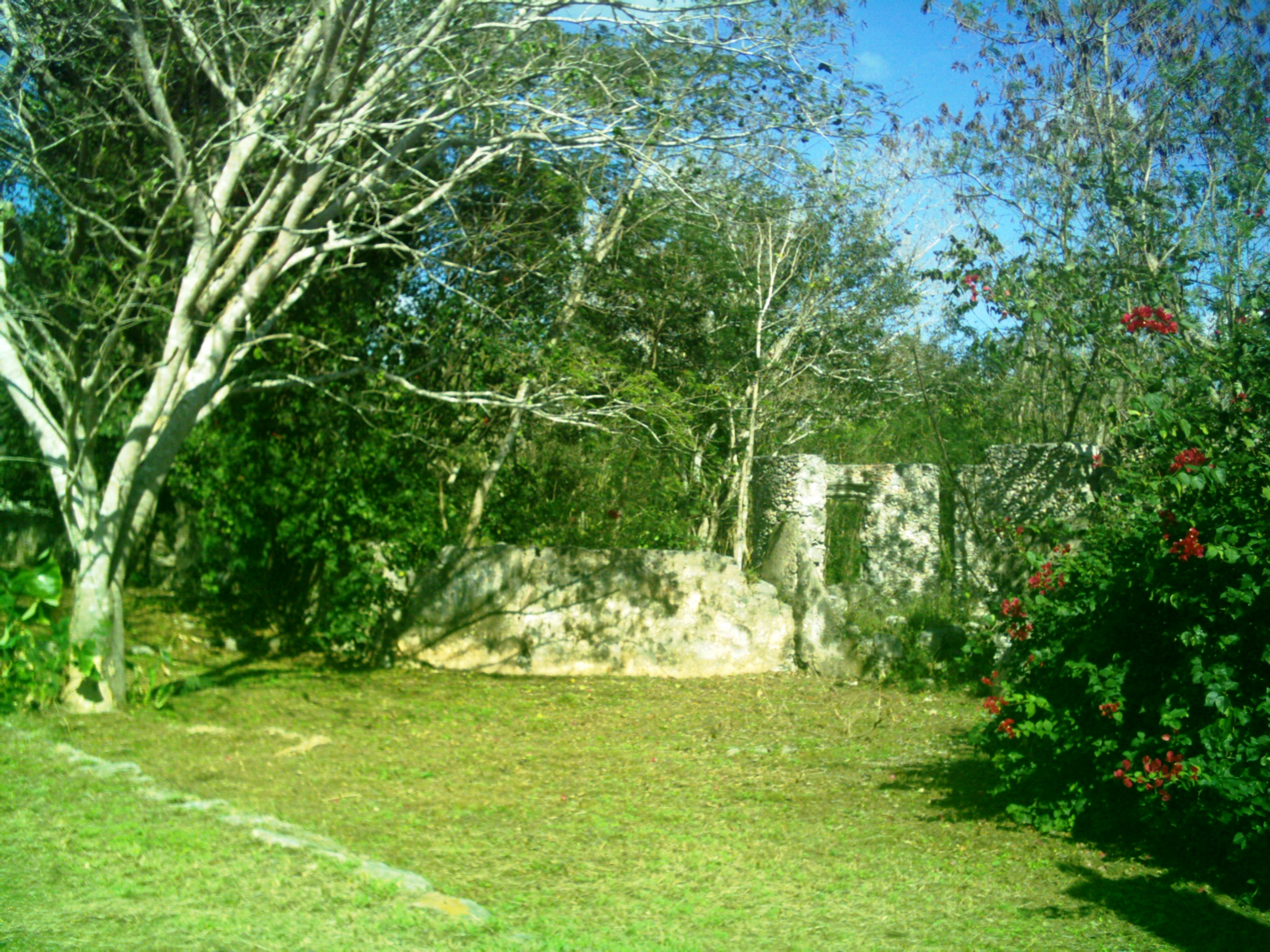
View of the Hacienda Kankabchén

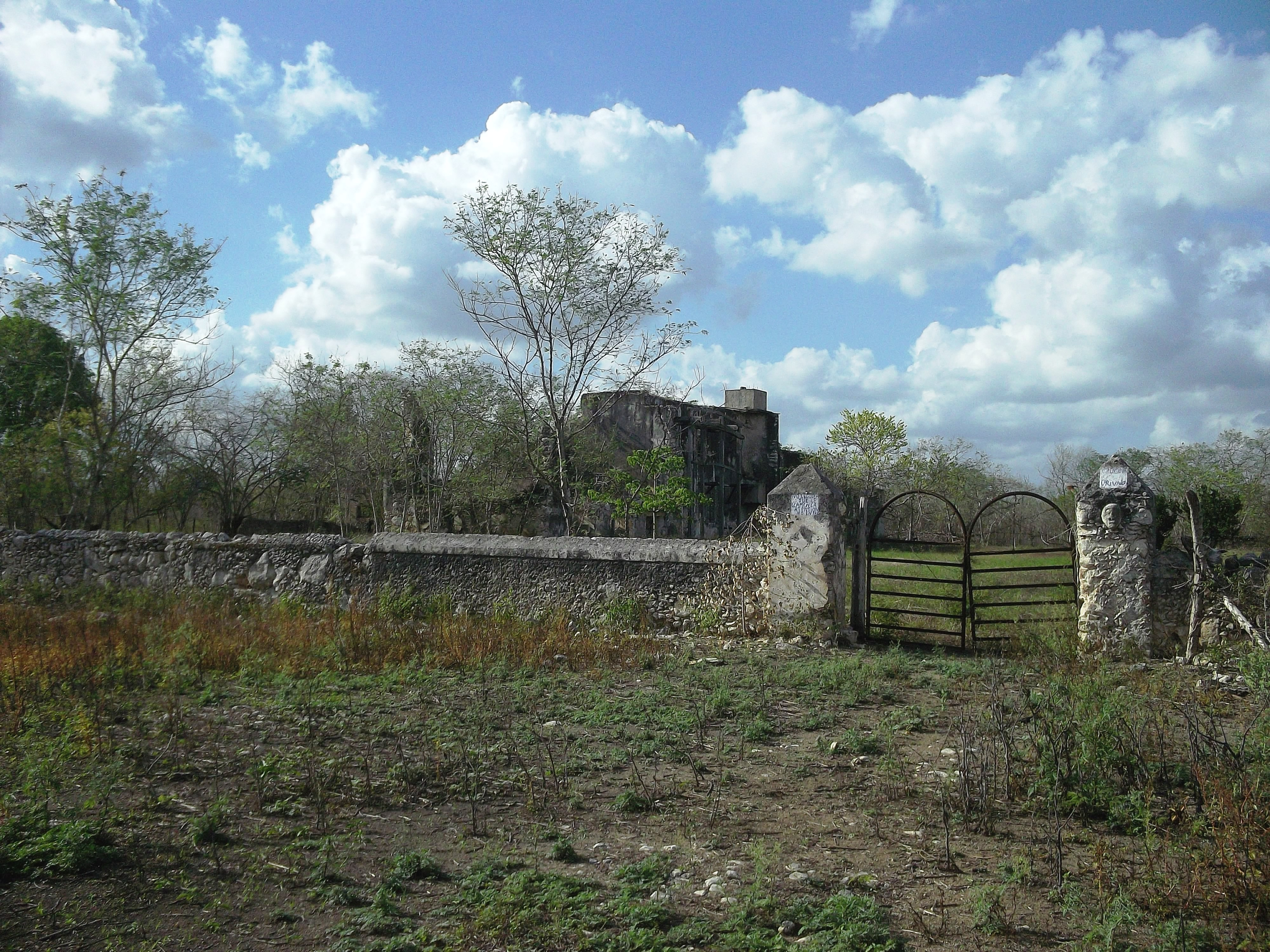
View of the Hacienda Kankabchén

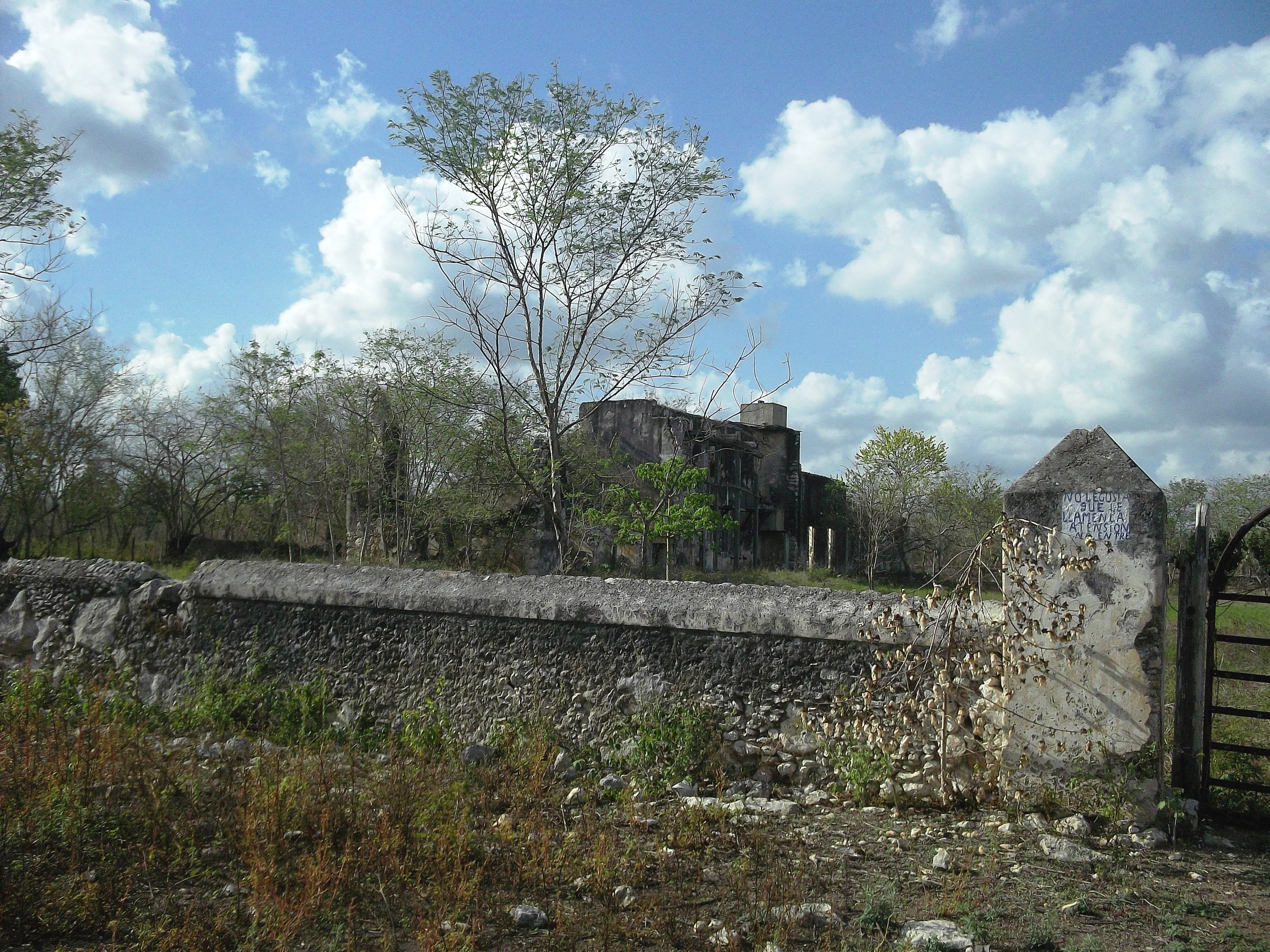
View of the Hacienda Kankabchén

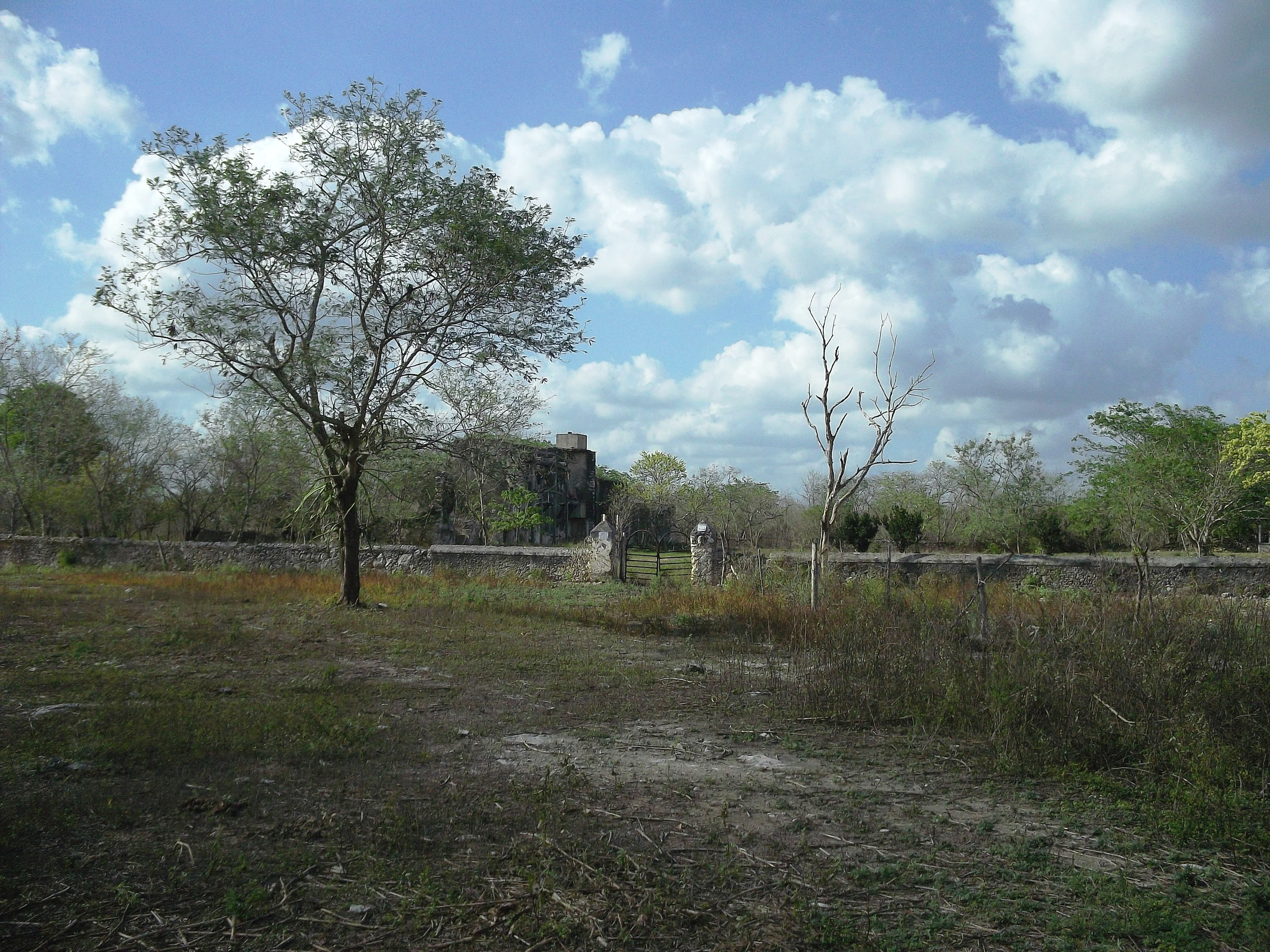
View of the Hacienda Kankabchén

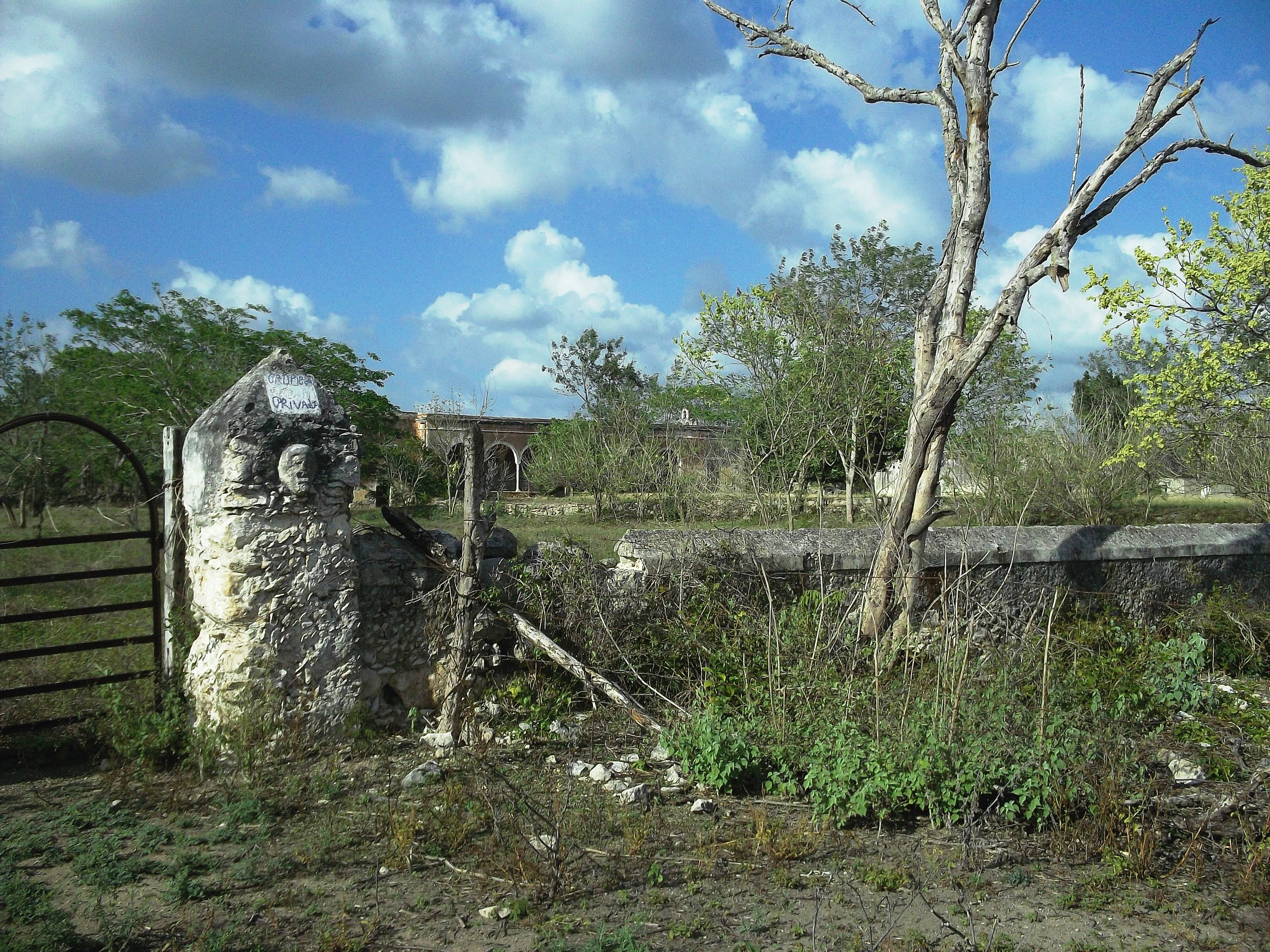
View of the Hacienda Kankabchén

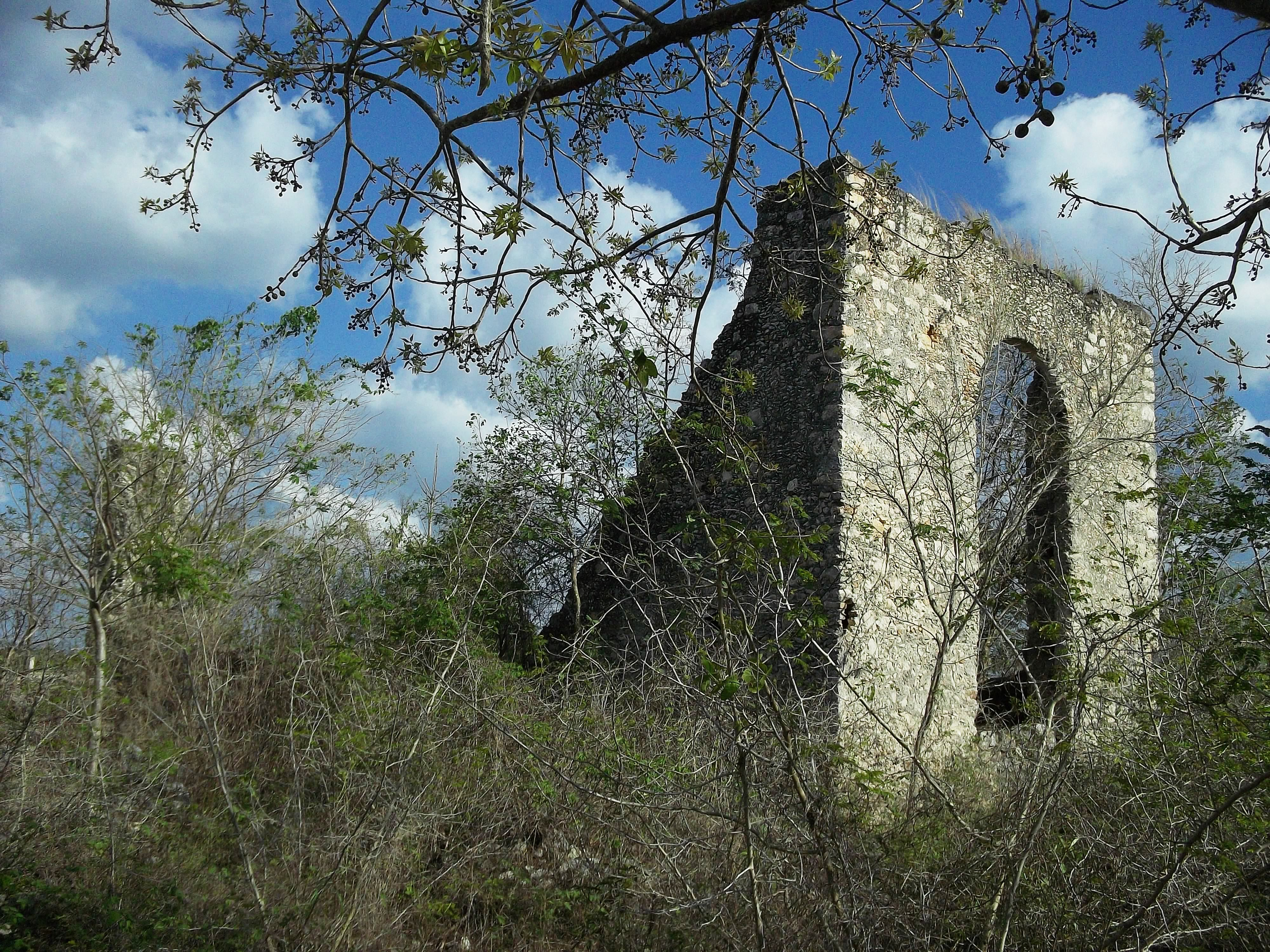
Church at Hacienda Kankabchén

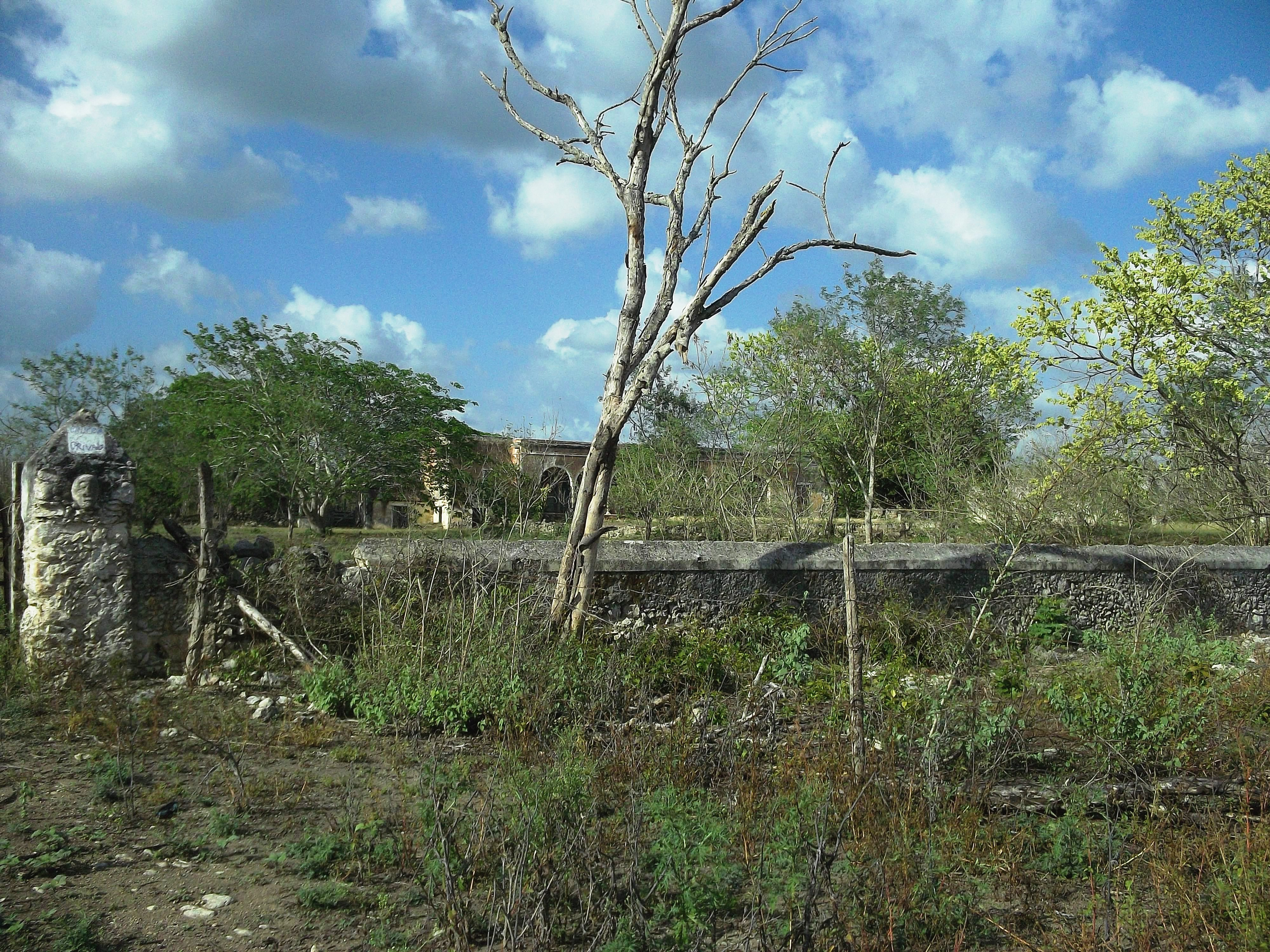
Church at Hacienda Kankabchén

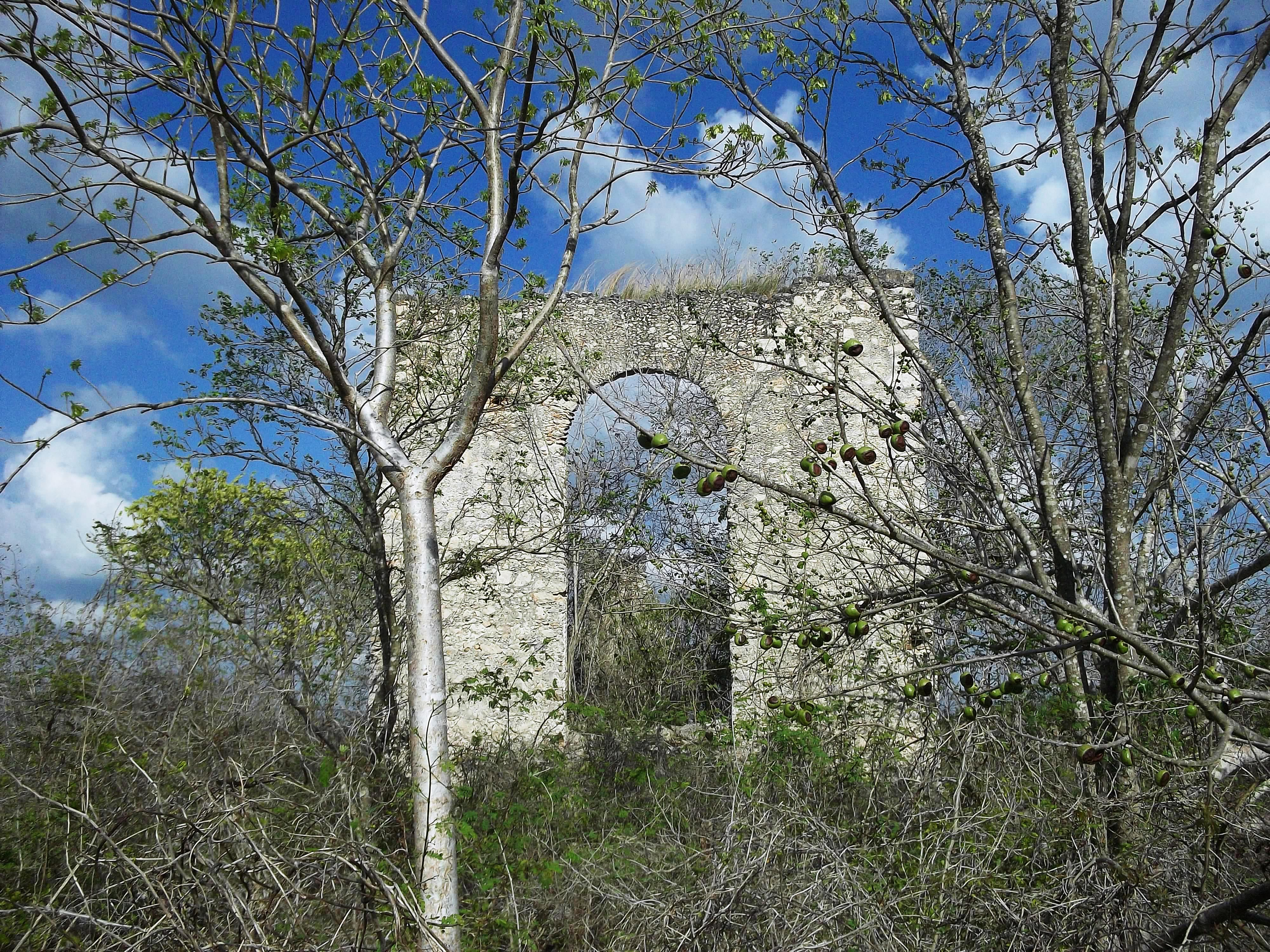
Church at Hacienda Kankabchén

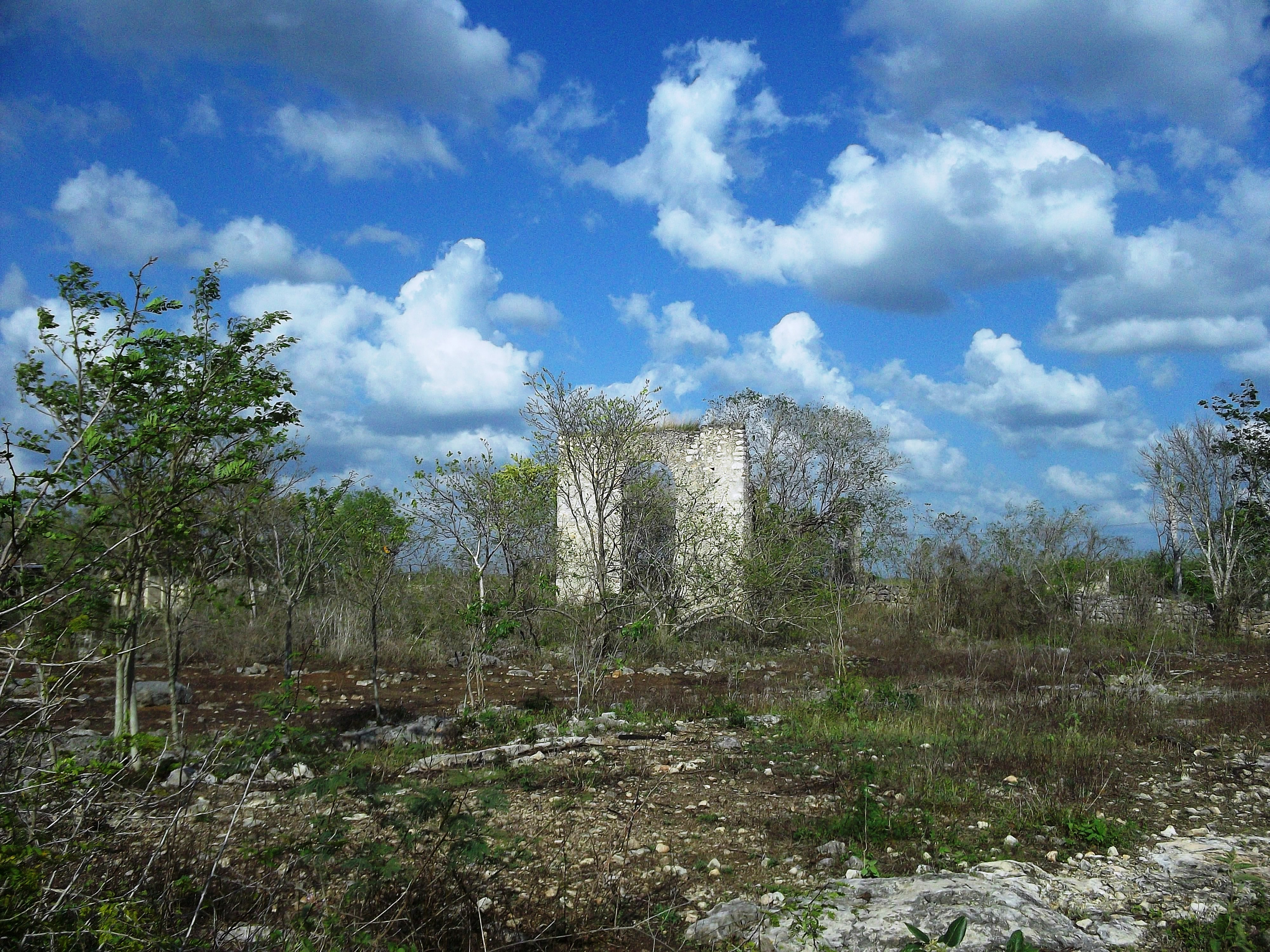
Church at Hacienda Kankabchén

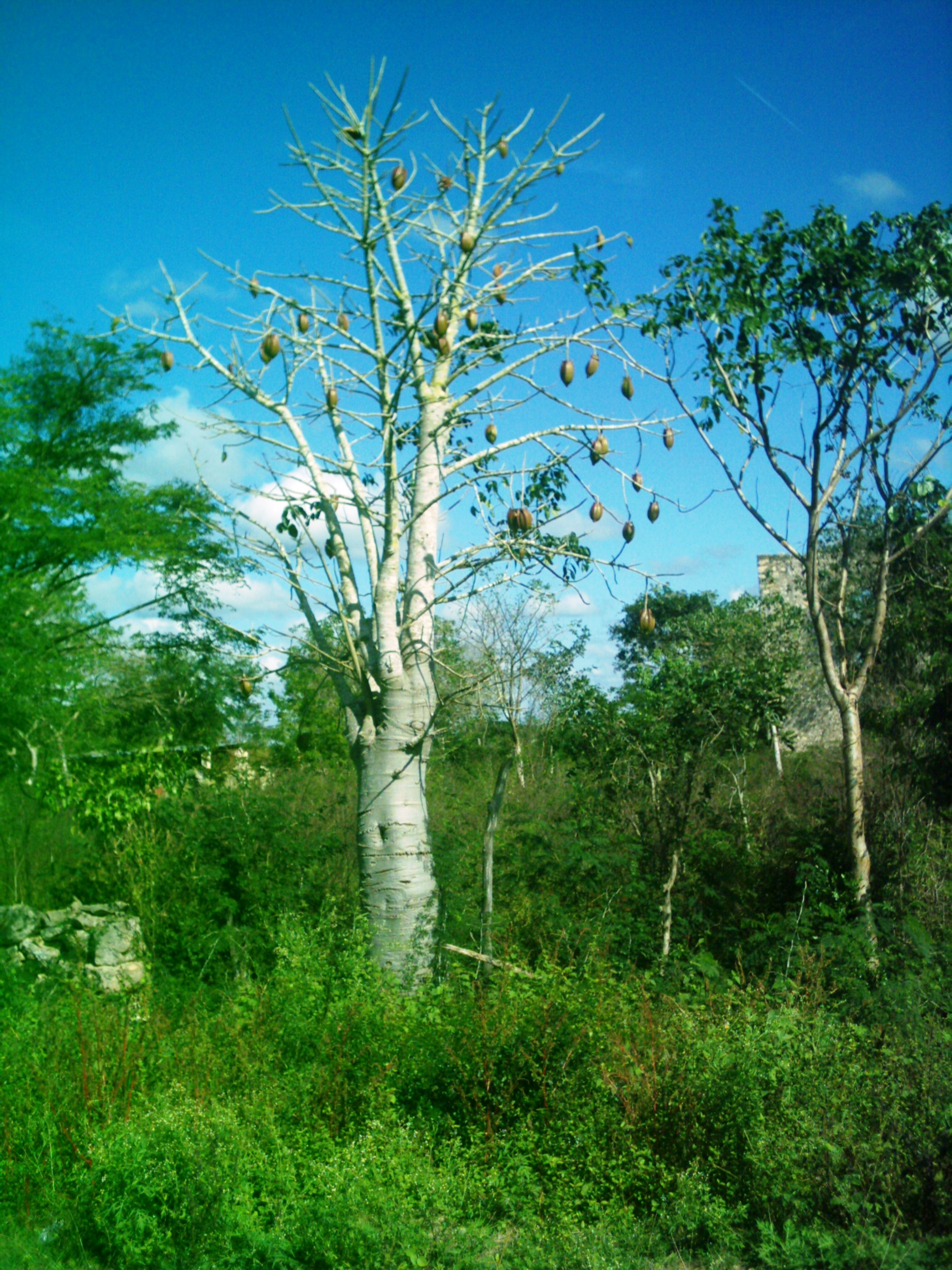
Grounds of the Hacienda Kankabchén

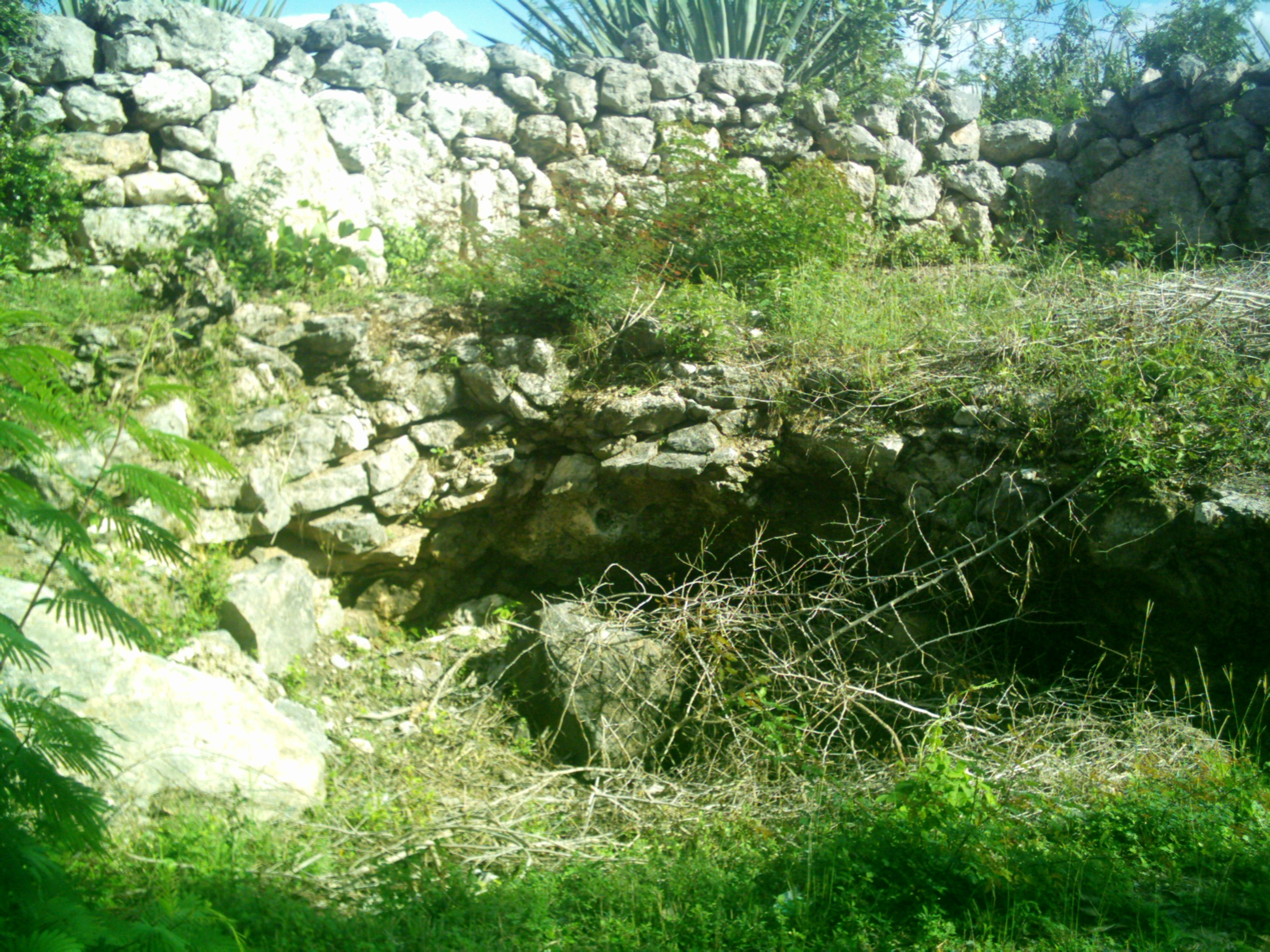
Mound at Hacienda Kankabchén

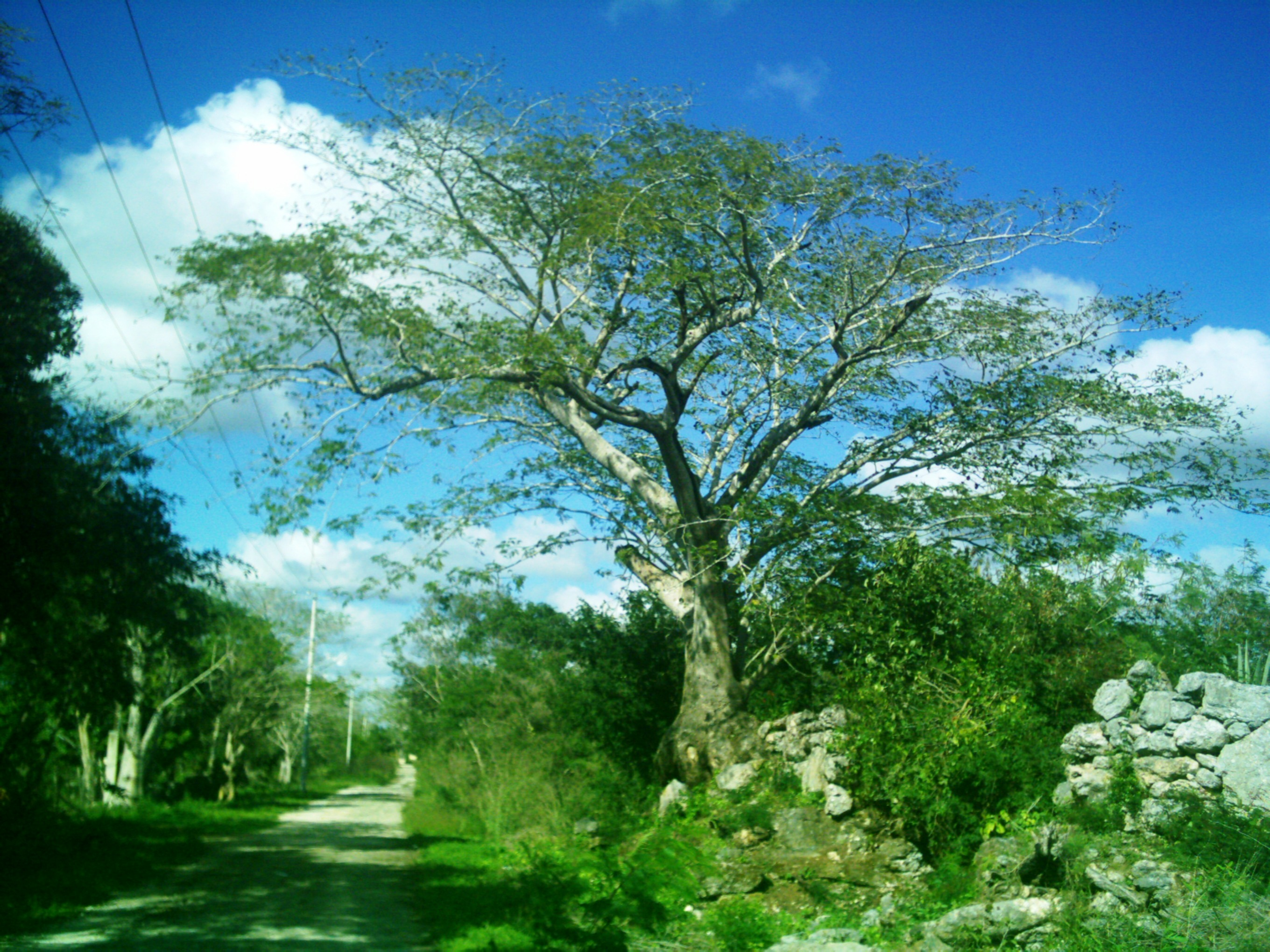
Grounds of the Hacienda Kankabchén

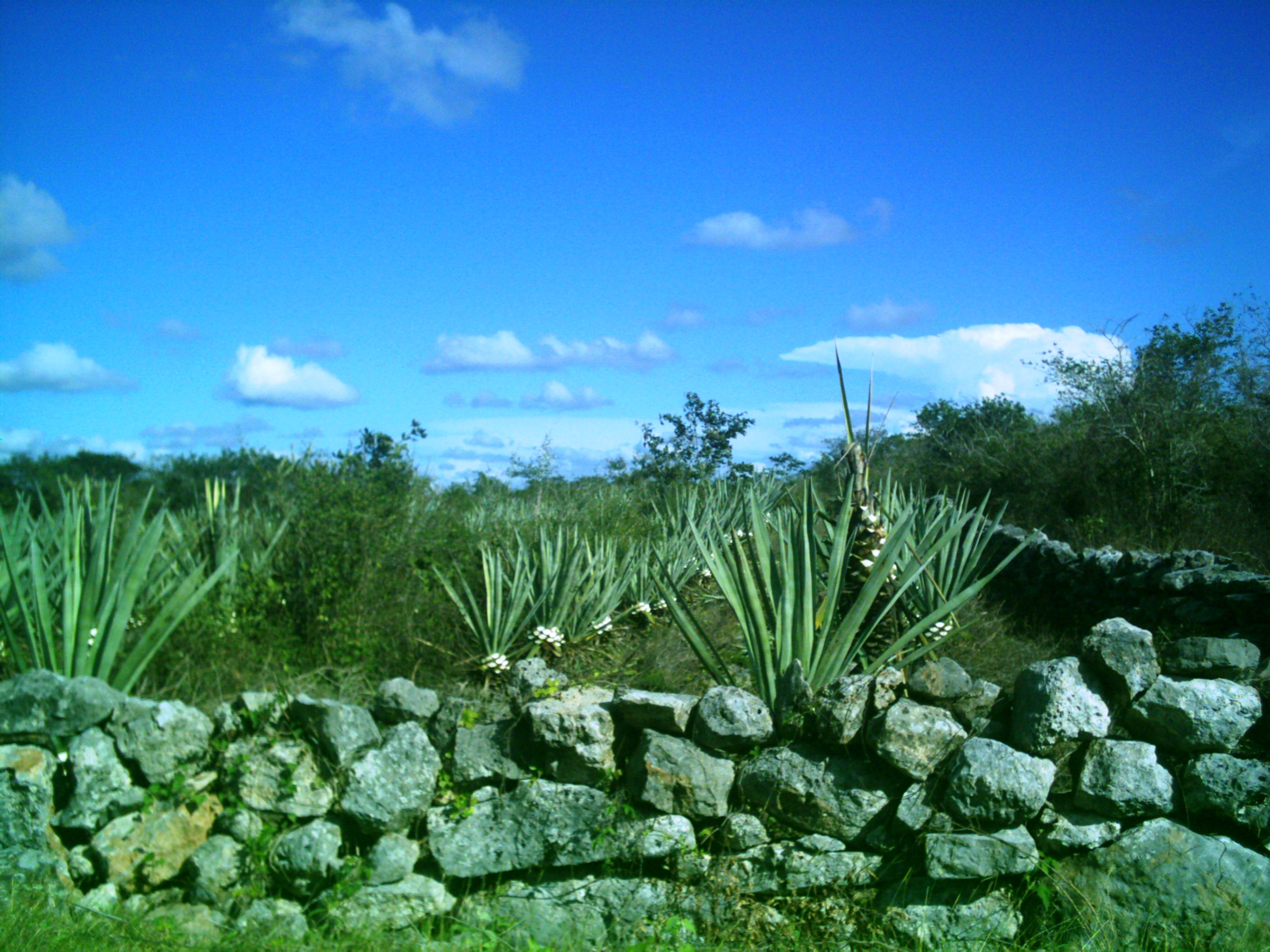
Henequen of Hacienda Kankabchén

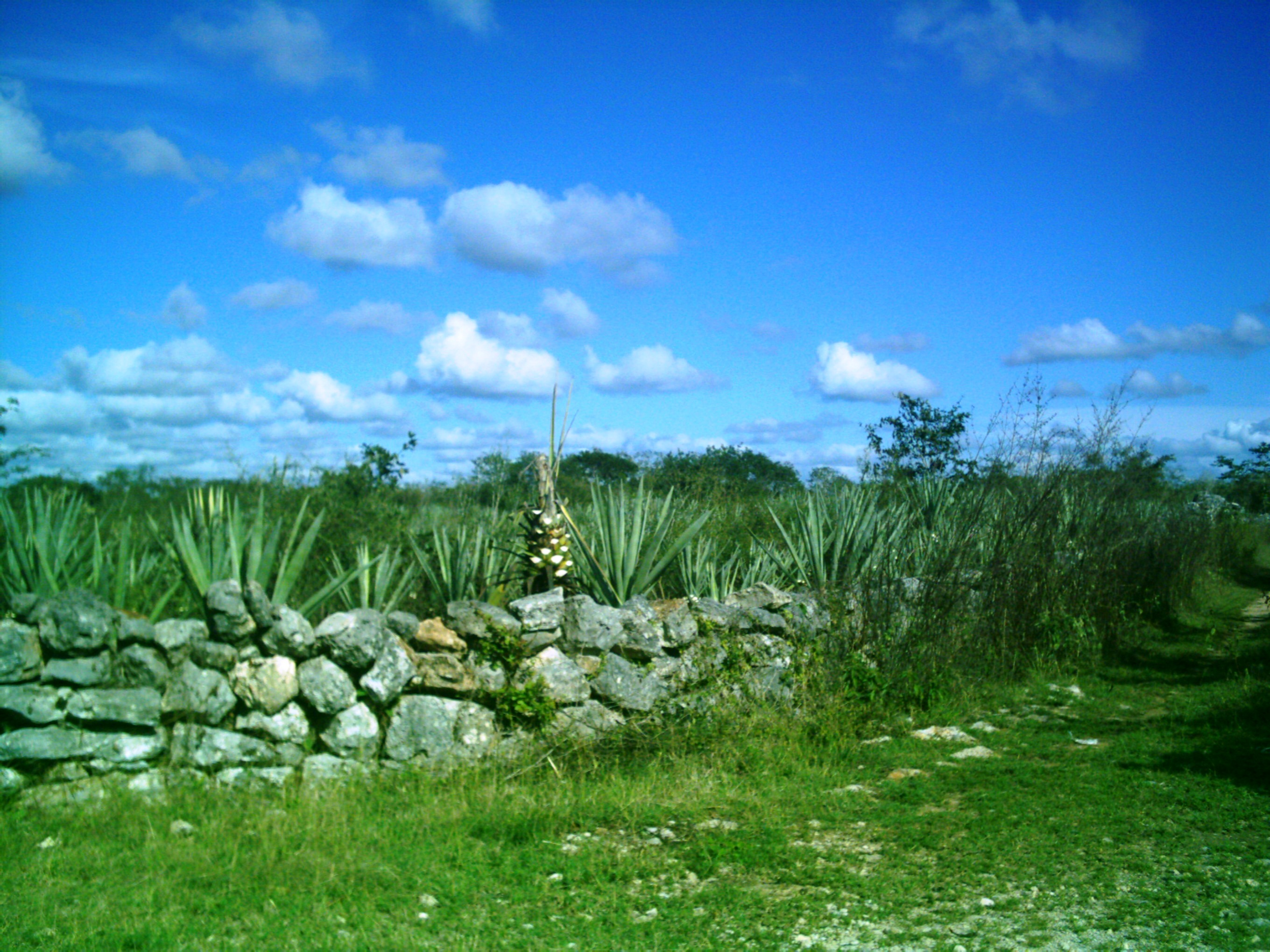
Henequen of Hacienda Kankabchén

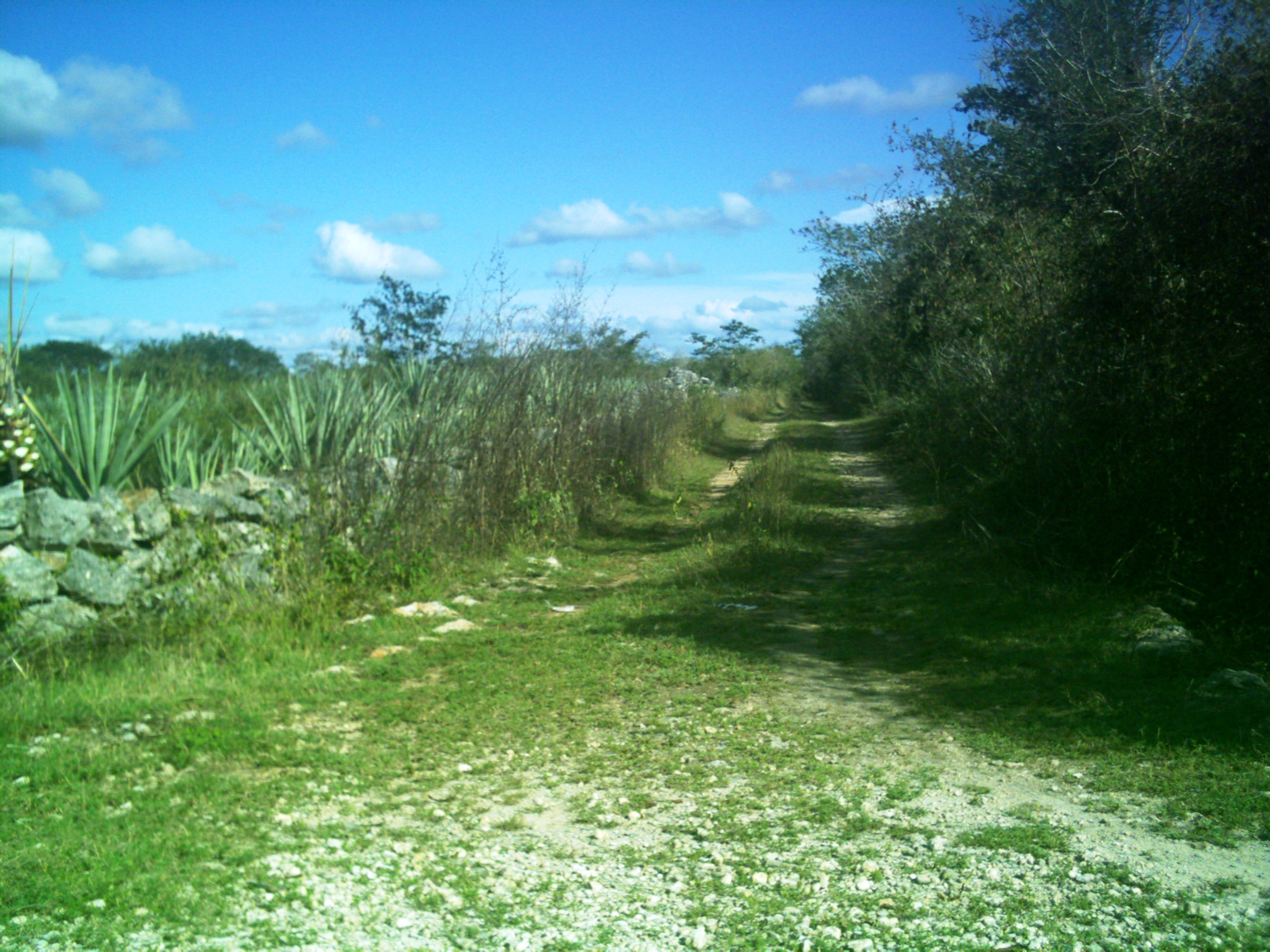
Road to the Hacienda Jesús María.
