= Hacienda Kancabchén (Homún) =

- Location in Mexico
- Coordinates: 20°44′55″N 89°16′25″W
- Country: Mexico
- Mexican States: Yucatán
- Municipalities: Homún
- Time zone: UTC−6 (CST)
  - Summer (DST): UTC−5 (CDT)
- Postal code: 97584
- Area code: 988

Hacienda Kancabchén is located in the Homún Municipality in the state of Yucatán in southeastern Mexico. It is one of the properties that arose during the nineteenth century henequen boom. There are numerous other properties of this name in the Yucatán including Hacienda Kancabchén in Baca, Hacienda Kancabchén (Halachó), Hacienda Kancabchén (Motul), Hacienda Kankabchén (Seyé), Hacienda Kankabchén (Tixkokob), Hacienda Kancabchén (Tunkás), Hacienda Kancabchén Ucí and Hacienda Kancabchén de Valencia.

== Toponymy ==
The name (Kancabchén) is a word from the Mayan language meaning the well of the red ground.

== How to get there ==
Go east out of Mérida on highway 180 approximately 42 km to the exit for the town of Hoctun. Head south approximately 35 km though the towns of Xocchel, Sahcabá, Huhí to Zavala. At Zavala turn southwest on Calle 8 and follow the road approximately 6 km to Hacienda Kancabchén.

== History ==
In 1939 the name changed from Kancabchén to Chan Kancabchén; in 1970, it changed again to Kanka-Chen; and in 1990 it returned to Kancabchén.

== Demographics ==
All of the henequen plantations ceased to exist as autonomous communities with the agrarian land reform implemented by President Lazaro Cardenas in 1937. His decree turned the haciendas into collective ejidos, leaving only 150 hectares to the former landowners for use as private property. Figures before 1937 indicate populations living on the farm. After 1937, figures indicate those living in the community, as the remaining Hacienda Kancabchén houses only the owner's immediate family.

According to the 2005 census conducted by the INEGI, the population of the city was 11 inhabitants.

Population of Kancabchén by year
Year	1900	1910	1921	1930	1940	1950	1960	1970	1980	1990	1995	2000	2005
Population	3	0	0	?	?	6	25	6	26	22	0	?	11

== Bibliography ==
- Bracamonte, P and Solís, R., Los espacios de autonomía maya, Ed. UADY, Mérida, 1997.
- Gobierno del Estado de Yucatán, "Los municipios de Yucatán", 1988.
- Kurjack, Edward y Silvia Garza, Atlas arqueológico del Estado de Yucatán, Ed. INAH, 1980.
- Patch, Robert, La formación de las estancias y haciendas en Yucatán durante la colonia, Ed. UADY, 1976.
- Peón Ancona, J. F., "Las antiguas haciendas de Yucatán", en Diario de Yucatán, Mérida, 1971.
