= Baca Municipality =

Municipality in the Mexican state of Yucatán

Baca
- Municipality
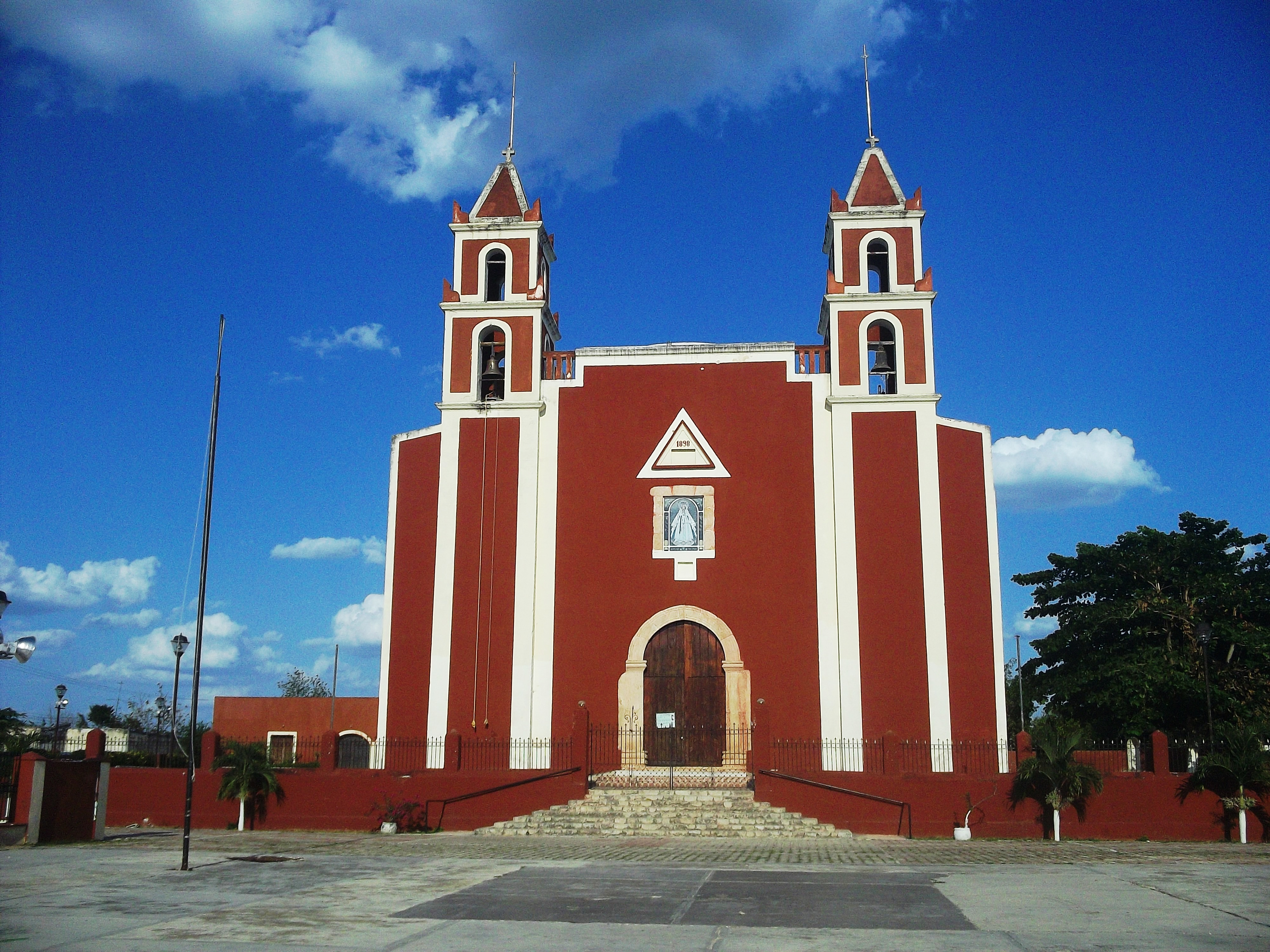
- Our Lady of the Assumption Church of Baca, Yucatán

- Region 2 Noroeste #004

- Location of the Municipality in Mexico
- Coordinates: 21°05′42″N 89°16′59″W
- Country: Mexico
- State: Yucatán

Government
  - Type: 2012–2015
  - Municipal President: Renan Ceballos Sosa

Area
  - Total: 118.78 km^{2} (45.86 sq mi)
- Elevation: 6 m (20 ft)

Population (2010)
  - Total: 5,701
- Time zone: UTC-6 (Central Standard Time)
- INEGI Code: 009
- Major Airport: Merida (Manuel Crescencio Rejón) International Airport
- IATA Code: MID
- ICAO Code: MMMD

Baca Municipality (In the Yucatec Maya Language: “water in the shape of a horn”) is a municipality in the Mexican state of Yucatán containing 118.78 km^{2} of land and located roughly 32 km east of the city of Mérida.

== History ==
In 1441 following the fall of Mayapan, the area fell within the provinces of Ceh Pech and after the conquest became part of the encomienda system. During the conquest, the batab (chief), Ah-Op-Pech, was baptized and took the name Ambrosio Pech, simultaneously being appointed as governor. He was succeeded by his son Pedro Pech in 1567. In 1704, the encomendero was Pedro Cepeda y Lira II, who was responsible for 1548 native inhabitants.

On 15 October 1881, the village became Villa Baca. In 1900, the station of Tixkunheil was categorized as a village. In 1912, San Antonio Tzutzá and its annex "Yaxnic" are joined with Baca municipality. In 1921, the Villa was dissolved and the land was returned to the ejido.

== Governance ==
The municipal president is elected for a three-year term. The town council has seven aldermen who serve as councilors for ecology, parks and public gardens; public safety; public works; public health; cemeteries; sanitation; and nomenclature.

== Communities ==
The head of the municipality is Baca, Yucatán. Within its municipal jurisdiction are eleven communities. Minor communities are Unidad de Riego Boxactún, Rancho Kiiché, Hacienda Kuxúb, San Carlos, San José Novelo, Santa Cruz Collí, Santa María and Santo Domingo. Three locations are considered important communities. The three major population areas are shown below:

Community	Population
Entire Municipality (2010)	5,701
Baca	4313 in 2005
San Isidro Kuxub	210 in 2005
Tixcuncheil	706 in 2005

== Local festivals ==
Every year from 1 to 3 May, Baca holds a fiesta in honor of the Holy Cross. Also in May from the 15 to 19, is an annual festival for San Isidro Labrador.

== Tourist attractions ==
- Our Lady of the Assumption Church
- Hacienda Hili
- Hacienda Kancabchén
- Hacienda Sacapuc
- Hacienda San Jose, houses Thai restaurant and Fundebien Charitable Foundation's cancer treatment center
- Hacienda Santa María
- Hacienda Siniltum
