= Baca, Yucatán =

Baca
- Locality
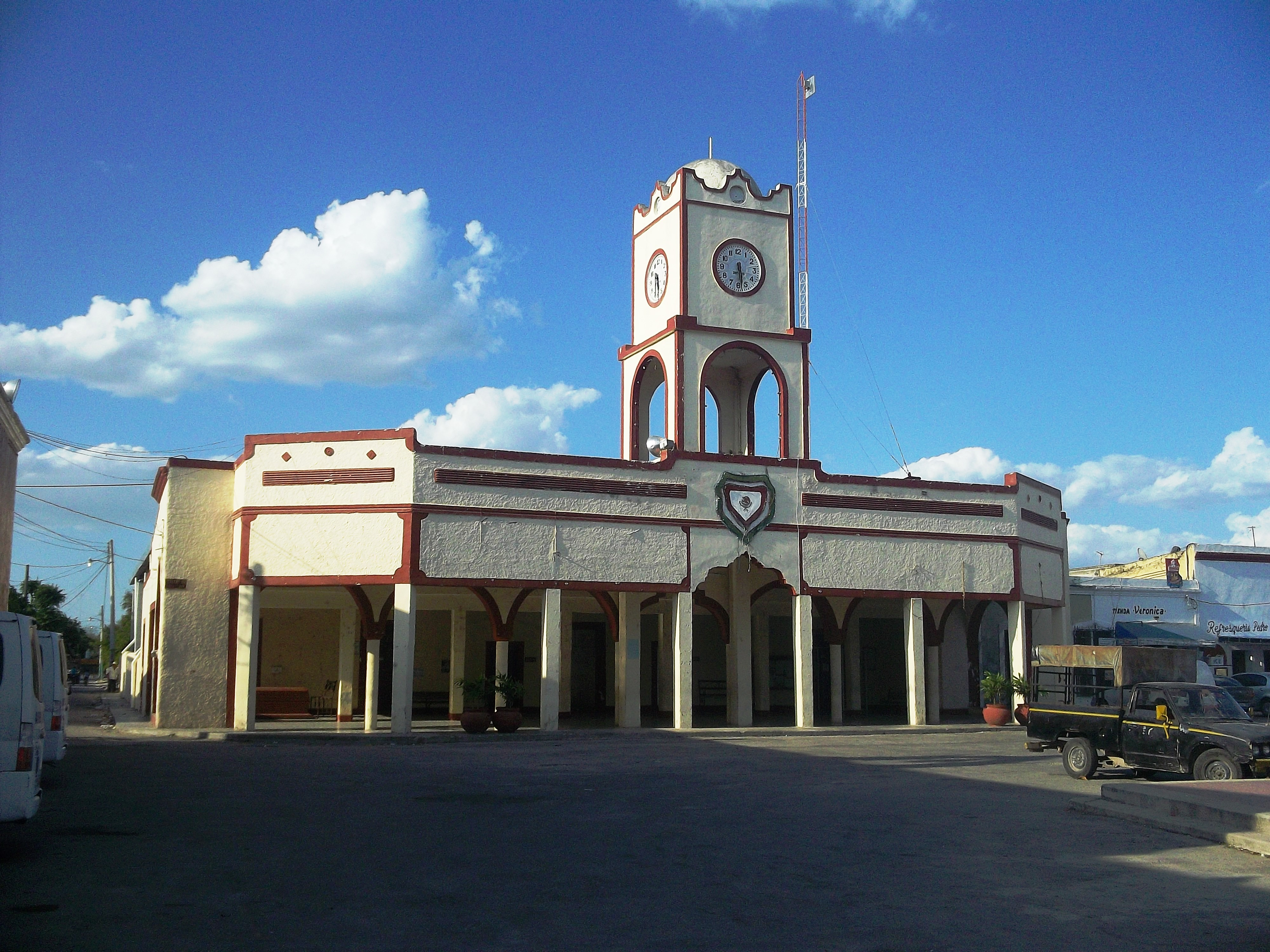
- Municipal Palace of Baca, Yucatán.

- Location of the Baca in Yucatán Location of the Baca in Mexico
- Coordinates: 21°06′33″N 89°23′55″W
- Country: Mexico
- State: Yucatán
- Municipality: Baca Municipality

Area
  - Total: 4.723 km^{2} (1.824 sq mi)
- Elevation: 10 m (33 ft)

Population (2020)
  - Total: 4,997
  - Density: 1,058/km^{2} (2,740/sq mi)
- Time zone: UTC-6 (Central Standard Time)
- Area code: 991
- INEGI Code: 310040001
- Major Airport: Merida (Manuel Crescencio Rejón) International Airport
- IATA Code: MID
- ICAO Code: MMMD

Baca is a locality in the state of Yucatán, Mexico, head of the homonymous municipality. It is located approximately 32 km (20 mi) east of Mérida, and 8 km (5.0 mi) west of Motul.

== Toponymy ==
The toponymic Baca is the Yucatec Maya word for "water in the shape of a horn".

== History ==
In 1441 following the fall of Mayapan, the area fell within the provinces of Ceh Pech and after the conquest became part of the encomienda system. During the conquest, the batab (chief), Ah-Op-Pech, was baptized and took the name Ambrosio Pech, simultaneously being appointed as governor. He was succeeded by his son Pedro Pech in 1567. In 1704, the encomendero was Pedro Cepeda y Lira II, who was responsible for 1548 native inhabitants.

On 15 October 1881, Baca was granted town status.

== Demographics ==
View chart definition.

== Local festivals ==
Every year from 1 to 3 May, Baca holds a fiesta in honor of the Holy Cross. Also in May from the 15 to 19, is an annual festival for San Isidro Labrador.
