= Hacienda Kancabchén (Baca) =

- Private Property/Dairy/Event Venue
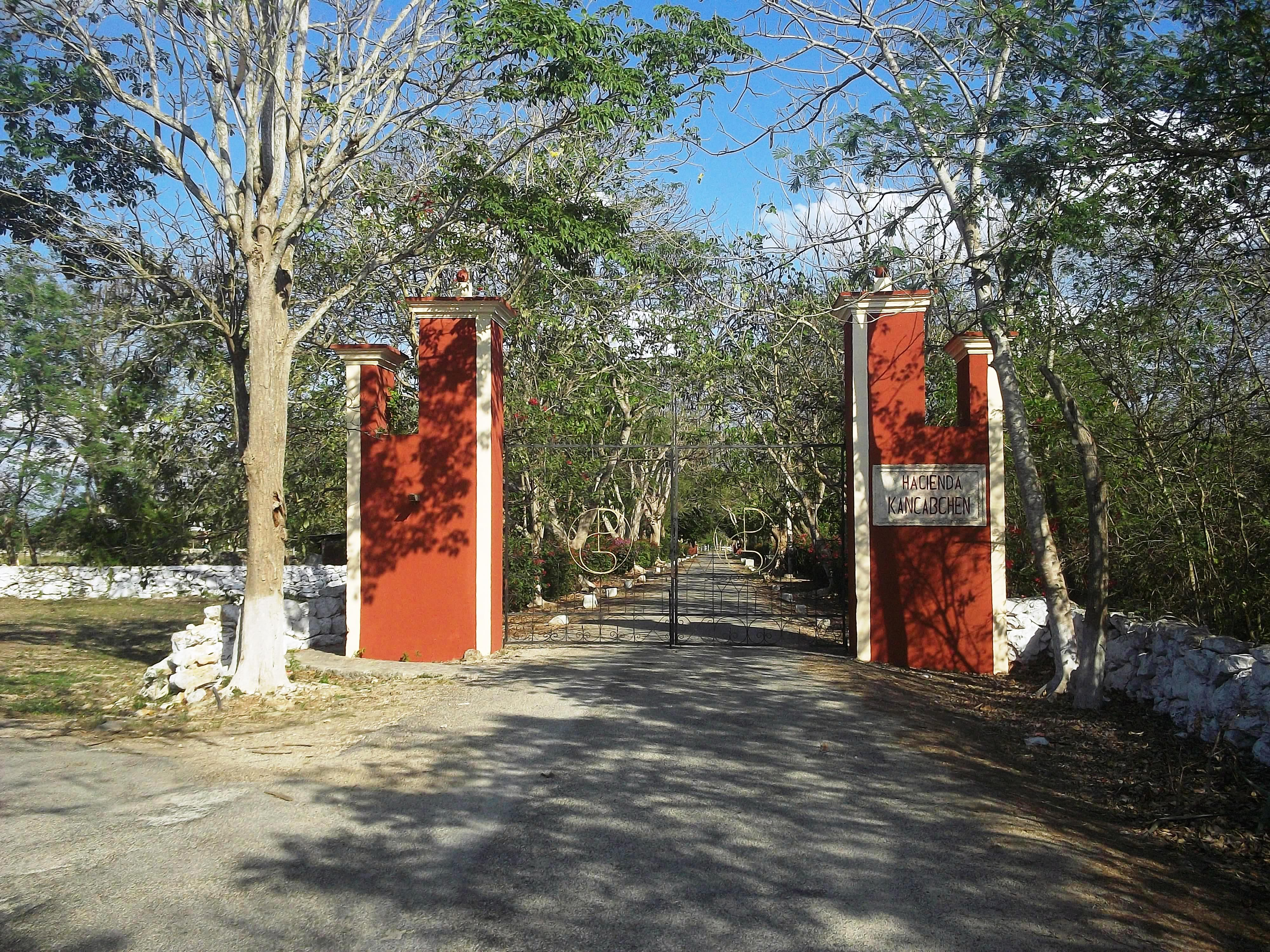
- Entrance Hacienda Kancabchén, Yucatán.

- Location in Mexico
- Coordinates: 21°05′04″N 89°22′57″W
- Country: Mexico
- Mexican States: Yucatán
- Municipalities: Baca Municipality
- Time zone: UTC−6 (CST)
  - Summer (DST): UTC−5 (CDT)
- Postal code: 97450
- Area code: 991

Hacienda Kancabchén (also known as Kancabchén Gamboa) is located in the Baca Municipality in the state of Yucatán in southeastern Mexico. It is one of the properties that arose during the nineteenth century henequen boom. Kancabchén is a word from the Mayan language meaning 'the well of the red ground'. The property is located 22 km from Mérida to the east of the Periférico off Carretera Mérida-Motul south of Baca.

== History ==
In either 1890 or 1912, Pascual Gamboa Rivero built Hacienda Kancabchén to engage in livestock and henequen activity. The property was inherited by his daughter, Josefina Gamboa de Casares, who kept it in her possession until 1985. In 1985 the property was sold to the Ponce Garcia family for a dairy farm and a get-away retreat.

== Architecture ==
The property was built in the style of the colonial haciendas. The facade features three arches along the portico. There is a belfry and a large clock on top of the building. Principal house is decorated with fine wall paintings and has large rooms, high ceilings and large windows. It is built on two levels, with 8 bedrooms, kitchen, breakfast area, library, living room, bathrooms and a casino.

The property also features a chapel, whose patron is St. Anthony of Padua, which has the capacity for 200 people. There is a zoo, garden, stables, rodeo arena and casino area complementing the gardens. The property can accommodate up to 600 people for private events.

== Bibliography ==
- Bracamonte, P and Solís, R., Los espacios de autonomía maya, Ed. UADY, Mérida, 1997.
- Gobierno del Estado de Yucatán, "Los municipios de Yucatán", 1988.
- Kurjack, Edward y Silvia Garza, Atlas arqueológico del Estado de Yucatán, Ed. INAH, 1980.
- Patch, Robert, La formación de las estancias y haciendas en Yucatán durante la colonia, Ed. UADY, 1976.
- Peón Ancona, J. F., "Las antiguas haciendas de Yucatán", en Diario de Yucatán, Mérida, 1971.
