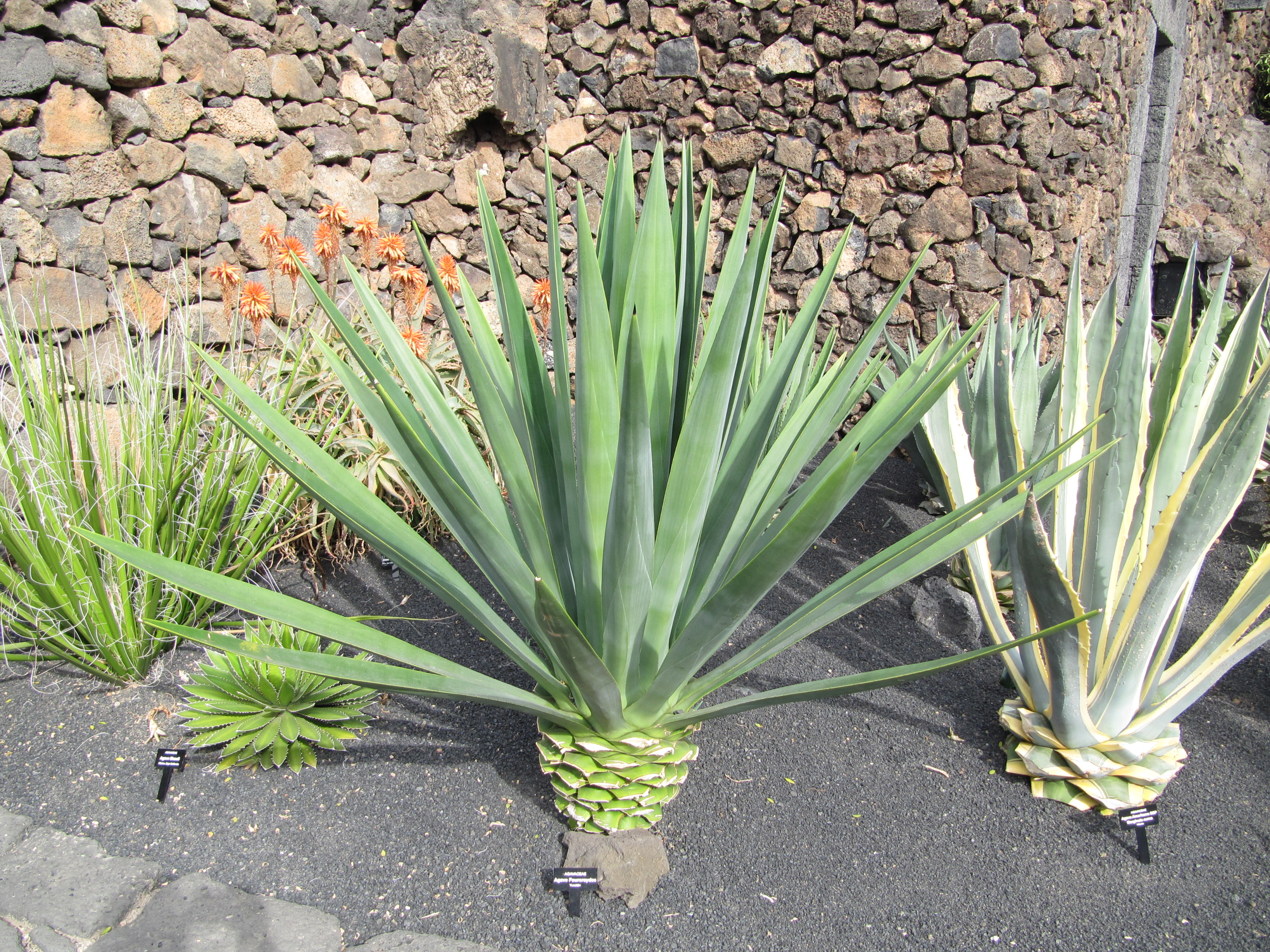

Scientific classification
- Kingdom: Plantae
- Clade: Embryophytes
- Clade: Tracheophytes
- Clade: Angiosperms
- Clade: Monocots
- Order: Asparagales
- Family: Asparagaceae
- Subfamily: Agavoideae
- Genus: Agave
- Species: A. fourcroydes

Binomial name
- Agave fourcroydes Lem.

Synonyms
- Agave fourcroydes var. espiculata L.H.Dewey; Agave sullivanii Trel.

= Agave fourcroydes =

Henequen

Species of flowering plant

Agave fourcroydes, commonly known as henequen, is a species of flowering plant in the family Asparagaceae, native to southern Mexico and Guatemala. It is cultivated, particularly in eastern Mexico, for its leaf fiber, known as henequen and used to make rope, twine, and other products.

Like sisal, A. fourcroydes is a sterile hybrid that is propagated vegetatively rather than from seed. It produces bulbils and suckers, although cultivation generally relies on suckers.

== Description ==
Agave fourcroydes can have a trunk as tall as 1.7 m (5.6 ft). It has a rosette of long narrow (lanceolate) leaves about 1.2–1.8 m (4–6 ft) long and 8–13 cm (3–5 in) wide. The leaves are gray-green and have widely spaced teeth along their edges and a strong dark brown terminal spine 2–2.5 cm (0.8–1.0 in) long. Numerous offsets are produced so that very large plants may form. The green to yellow flowers are produced in a many-branched panicle 5–6 m (16–20 ft) tall. A. fourcroydes is sterile, so no seeds are produced, but many bulbils appear after flowering.

== Cultivation ==
The leaves of Agave fourcroydes yield a fiber also called henequen, which is suitable for rope and twine but not of as high a quality as sisal. It has been cultivated for fibre in eastern Mexico for many years, most commonly in Yucatán, Veracruz, and Tamaulipas, and has been grown widely elsewhere, for ornament as well as for fibre. It is also used to make licor del henequén, a traditional Mexican alcoholic drink. It may be used as an ornamental plant in areas where temperatures below −2 °C (28 °F) do not occur, as it is frost tender.

It can be propagated either from its bulbils or from offsets.

The first person of Spanish descent to document the plant and its usefulness for ropes and other naval utensils was José María Lanz, a Mexican-born engineer in service of the Spanish Navy, who studied henequen in Yucatán in 1783.

=== Mezcal ===
Henequen, like other species of agave, is used in the production of mezcal.

== Gallery ==
Henequen farm in Yucatán Peninsula.

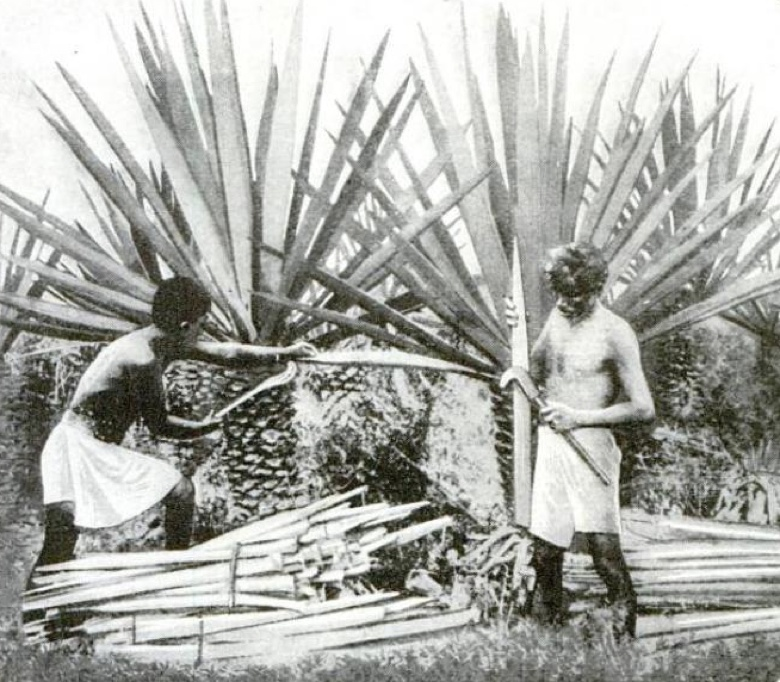
Henequen being harvested in 1922 for pulp to make paper.

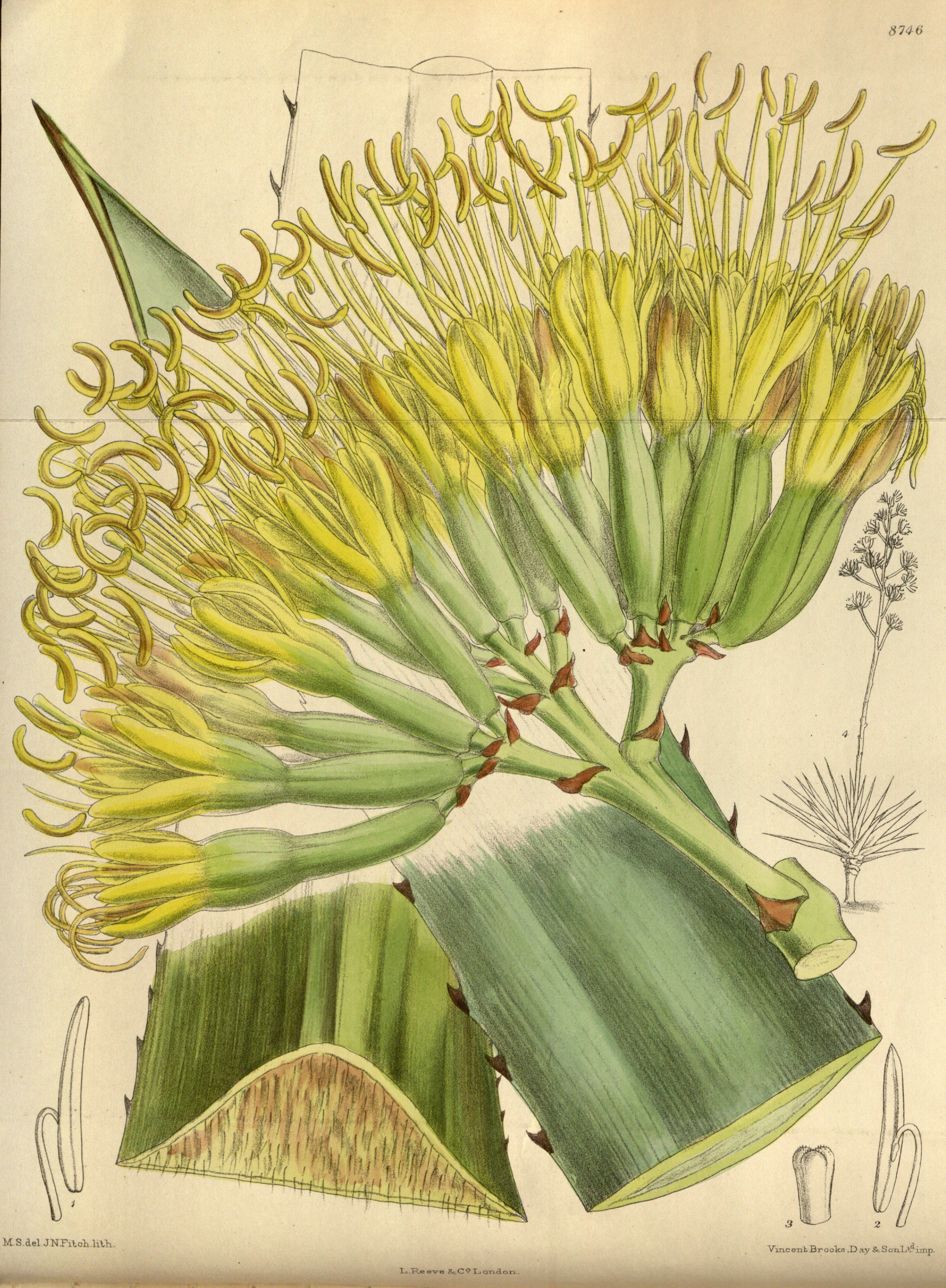

== See also ==
- Henequen industry in Yucatán
- International Year of Natural Fibres 2009
