= Postal codes in Mexico =

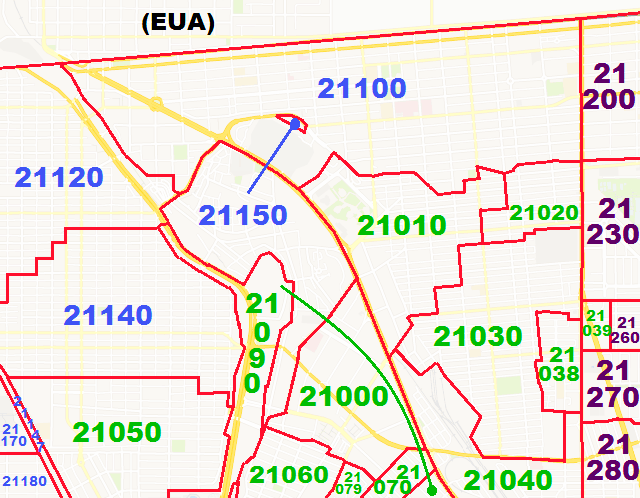
A map of central Mexicali, Baja California, showing postal code allocations.

Postal codes in Mexico are issued by Correos de México, the national postal service. They are of five digits and modelled on the United States Postal Service's ZIP Code system.

The first two digits identify a federal entity (or part thereof).

- The 01–16 range refers to Mexico City with each corresponds to a borough (demarcación territorial) of the city.
- The 20–99 range is used to identify the 31 states (estados). Code assignments to the states are done alphabetically by their names according to the old Spanish orthography, where the digraph ⟨ch⟩ was treated as a single letter and places after other words begin with ⟨c⟩.
- Postal codes beginning with 00, 17, 18, 19 are not in use.

The later three digits identify municipalities (municipios) or other local settlements.

| Range | Federal entity | | Range | Federal entity | | Range | Federal entity | |
|---|---|---|---|---|---|---|---|---|
| 01–16 | Mexico City | CMX | 20 | Aguascalientes | AGU | 21–22 | Baja California | BCN |
| 23 | Baja California Sur | BCS | 24 | Campeche | CAM | 25–27 | Coahuila | COA |
| 28 | Colima | COL | 29–30 | Chiapas | CHP | 31–33 | Chihuahua | CHH |
| 34–35 | Durango | DUR | 36–38 | Guanajuato | GUA | 39–41 | Guerrero | GRO |
| 42–43 | Hidalgo | HID | 44–49 | Jalisco | JAL | 50–57 | México (state) | MEX |
| 58–61 | Michoacán | MIC | 62 | Morelos | MOR | 63 | Nayarit | NAY |
| 64–67 | Nuevo León | NLE | 68–71 | Oaxaca | OAX | 72–75 | Puebla | PUE |
| 76 | Querétaro | QUE | 77 | Quintana Roo | ROO | 78–79 | San Luis Potosí | SLP |
| 80–82 | Sinaloa | SIN | 83–85 | Sonora | SON | 86 | Tabasco | TAB |
| 87–89 | Tamaulipas | TAM | 90 | Tlaxcala | TLA | 91–96 | Veracruz | VER |
| 97 | Yucatán | YUC | 98–99 | Zacatecas | ZAC | — | | |

| | 0 | 1 | 2 | 3 | 4 | 5 | 6 | 7 | 8 | 9 |
|---|---|---|---|---|---|---|---|---|---|---|
| 0 | — | CMX | | | | | | | | |
| 1 | CMX | | | | | | | — | | |
| 2 | AGU | BCN | | BCS | CAM | COA | | | COL | CHP |
| 3 | CHP | CHH | | | DUR | | GUA | | | GRO |
| 4 | GRO | | HID | | JAL | | | | | |
| 5 | MEX | | | | | | | | MIC | |
| 6 | MIC | | MOR | NAY | NLE | | | | OAX | |
| 7 | OAX | | PUE | | | | QUE | ROO | SLP | |
| 8 | SIN | | | SON | | | TAB | TAM | | |
| 9 | TLA | VER | | | | | | YUC | ZAC | |

== See also ==
- List of states of Mexico
- Mexico state-abbreviation codes
