= Ejido =

Communal farming unit in Mexico

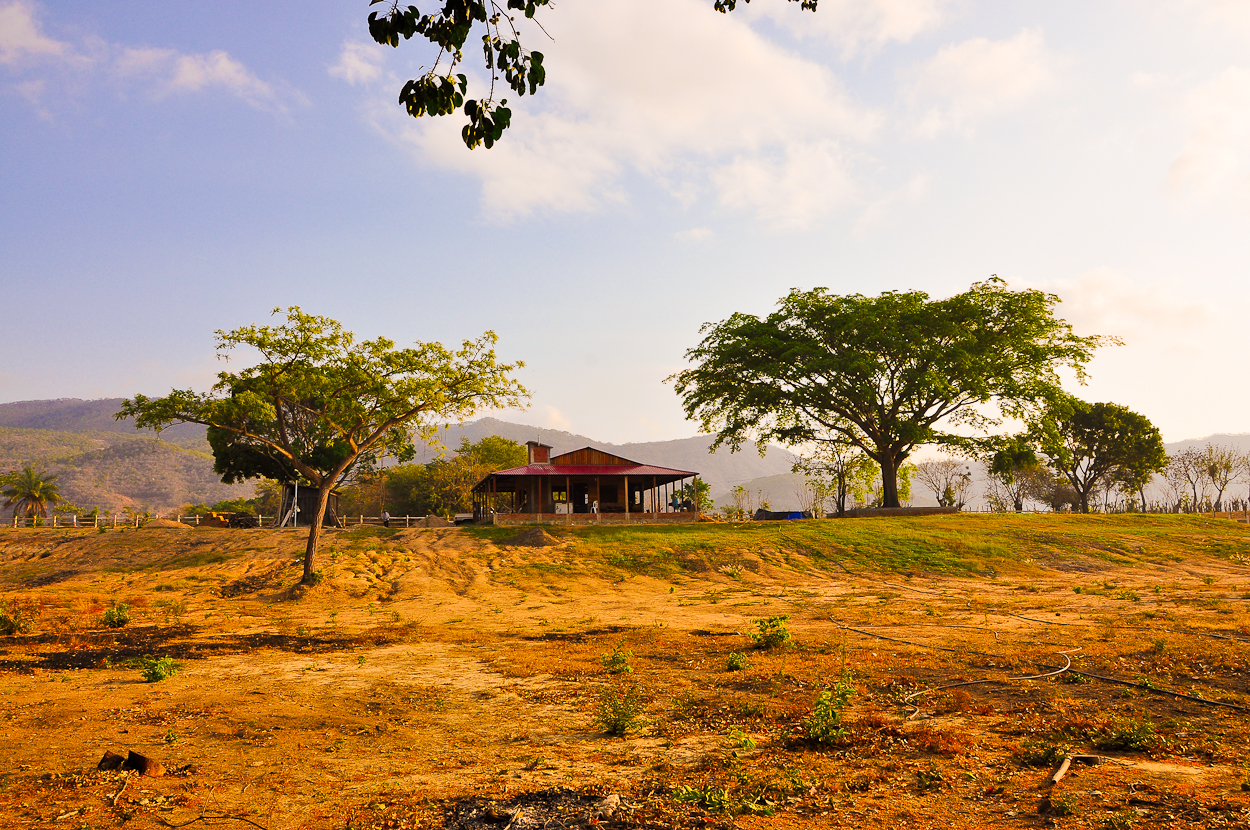
Ejido Cuauhtémoc in Jiquipilas, Chiapas

An ejido (Spanish pronunciation: [eˈxiðo], from Latin exitum) is an area of communal land used for agriculture in which community members have usufruct rights rather than ownership rights to land, which in Mexico is held by the Mexican state. People awarded ejidos in the modern era farm them individually in parcels and collectively maintain communal holdings with government oversight. Although the system of ejidos was based on an understanding of the preconquest Aztec calpulli and the medieval Spanish ejido, since the 20th century ejidos have been managed and controlled by the government.

After the Mexican Revolution, ejidos were created by the Mexican state to grant lands to peasant communities as a means to stem social unrest. As Mexico prepared to enter the North American Free Trade Agreement in 1991, President Carlos Salinas de Gortari declared the end of awarding ejidos and allowed existing ejidos to be rented or sold, ending land reform in Mexico.

== History ==
=== Colonial-era Indigenous community land holdings ===
In central Mexico following the Spanish conquest of the Aztec Empire (1519-1521), Indigenous communities remained largely intact, including their system of land tenure. The Spanish crown guaranteed that Indigenous communities had land under its control, the fundo legal. It also established the General Indian Court so that individual natives and Indigenous communities could defend their rights against Spanish encroachment. Spaniards applied their own terminology to Indigenous community lands, and early in the colonial era began calling them ejidos.

=== Nineteenth century ===
Mexico achieved its independence from Spain in 1821, following the Mexican War of Independence. The new sovereign nation abolished crown protections of Natives and Indigenous communities, making them equal before the law rather than vassals of the Spanish crown. The disappearance of the General Indian Court was one effect of independence. With political instability and economic stagnation following independence, Indigenous communities largely maintained their land holdings, since large landed estates were not expanding to increase production.

For nineteenth-century Mexican liberals, the continuing separateness of Natives and Indigenous villages from the Mexican nation was deemed "The Indian Problem," and the breakup of communal landholding was identified as the key to integrating Indians into the Mexican nation. When the Liberals came to power in 1855, they embarked on a major reform that included the expropriation and sale of corporate lands, that is, those held by Indigenous communities and by the Roman Catholic Church. The Liberal Reform first put in place the Lerdo Law, calling for the end of corporate landholding, and then incorporated that law into the Constitution of 1857. Ejidos were thus legally abolished, although many continued to survive. Mexico was plunged into civil unrest, civil war, and a foreign invasion by the French. Land reform did not begin to take effect until the expulsion of the French in 1867 and the restoration of the Mexican republic under Liberal control. Under liberal general Porfirio Díaz, who seized power through a coup in 1876, policies aimed at promoting political stability and economic prosperity with the motto "order and progress" led to the expansion of large haciendas, forcing many villages to lose their lands and leaving the peasantry landless.

=== Twentieth century ===
Many peasants participated in the Mexican Revolution, with the expectation that their village lands could be restored. In particular, many peasants in the state of Morelos under the leadership of Emiliano Zapata waged war against the presidency of Francisco I. Madero, a wealthy landowner whose reformist political movement sought to oust the regime of Porfirio Díaz; Victoriano Huerta, the leader of a reactionary coup that ousted and assassinated Madero; and Venustiano Carranza, a wealthy landowner who led the Constitutionalist faction, which defeated all others. In 1917, a new Constitution was drafted, which included empowerment of the government to expropriate privately held resources. Many peasants expected Article 27 of the Constitution to bring about the breakup of large haciendas and to return land to peasant communities. Carranza was entirely resistant to the expropriation of haciendas, and in fact returned many to their owners that had been seized by revolutionaries.

Distribution of large amounts of land did not begin until Lázaro Cárdenas became president in 1934. The ejido system was introduced as an important component of the land reform in Mexico. Under Cárdenas, land reform was "sweeping, rapid, and, in some respects, structurally innovative... he promoted the collective ejido (hitherto a rare institution) in order to justify the expropriation of large commercial estates."

The typical procedure for the establishment of an ejido involved the following steps:

1. landless farmers who leased lands from wealthy landlords would petition the federal government for the creation of an ejido in their general area;
2. the federal government would consult with the landlord;
3. the land would be expropriated from the landlords if the government approved the ejido; and
4. an ejido would be established and the original petitioners would be designated as ejidatarios with certain cultivation/use rights.

Ejidatarios do not own the land but are allowed to use their allotted parcels indefinitely as long as they do not fail to use the land for more than two years. They can pass their rights on to their children.

== Criticism ==
Opponents of the ejido system pointed to widespread corruption within the Banco Nacional de Crédito Rural (Banrural)—the primary institution responsible for providing loans to ejidatarios—illegal sales and transfers of ejido lands, ecological degradation, and low productivity as evidence of the system's failure. Proponents countered these arguments by pointing out that every administration since that of Cárdenas had been either indifferent or openly hostile to ejidos, that the land assigned to ejidos was often of lower quality and inherently less productive than privately held land. Also, the majority of agricultural research and support was biased towards large-scale commercial enterprises. The politicians complaining about Banrural were the people responsible for the corruption, and regardless of its productivity, subsistence production is an important survival strategy for many peasants.

== Change ==
As part of a larger program of neoliberal economic restructuring that had already been weakening support for ejidal and other forms of small-scale agriculture and negotiation of the North American Free Trade Agreement (NAFTA), President Carlos Salinas de Gortari in 1992 pushed legislation through Congress that modified article 27 of the Mexican Constitution to permit the privatization and the sale of ejidal land. This was a direct cause of the Chiapas conflict.

The changes to the ejidal system have largely failed to improve ejidal productivity, and have been implicated as significant contributing factors to worsening rural poverty, forced migration, and the conversion of Mexico, where the cultivation of maize originated, into a net importer of maize and food in general.

The majority of peasants were part of the ejido system with a male figure being the head of the household. On ejido land job opportunities were limited creating a push for the male figures to migrate to the United States in order to support their households and land. US job opportunities for Mexican migrants would include agricultural sectors which contributed to further development of the ejido land and growing agricultural technology. Those who lived on ejido land but did not own the land were more inclined to leave the rural land as well. After these male figures would leave the household the families left behind would consist of the wife and her husband's family, which allowed women increased participation in household decision-making in the absence of male figures.

== See also ==
- Chacra
- Commons
- Common land
- Communal land
- Community land trust
- Chiapas conflict
- México Indígena: controversial geography research project studying the future of the ejido and the comunidad agraria
- Usufruct
- Well-field system: communal lands
