= Haciendas of Yucatán =

Yucatán Agricultural Organizations

Haciendas of Yucatán were agricultural organizations that emerged primarily in the 18th century. They had a late onset in Yucatán compared with the rest of Mexico because of geographical, ecological and economical reasons, particularly the poor quality of the soil and lack of water to irrigate farms. Commonly the farms were initially used exclusively for cattle ranching, with a low density of labor, becoming over time maize-growing estates in the north and sugar plantations in the south, before finally becoming henequen estates.

"Haciendas henequeneras" refers to estates in the Yucatán which were created during the 19th century when the henequen industry debuted. The hacienda henequenera required large staffing for the cultivation of the fields, as well as, the development and maintenance of industrial processes, such as shredding the leaves. One of the regions of Yucatán which had produced maize but evolved into the henequen industry is the area adjoining and near to Mérida. Along the main roads and in the "camino real" between Campeche and Mérida, these haciendas became established. By the 19th century, the hacienda henequenera developed on a wider scale throughout Yucatán, particularly in the north-central region, where the soil was better suited for the cultivation of henequen.

== History ==
The haciendas of Yucatán were agricultural organizations that emerged in the late seventeenth century and during the eighteenth century. Unlike in the rest of Mexico and in most of Latin America, these farms in this region were not established immediately after the conquest and during the seventeenth century. In Yucatán, because of geographical, ecological and economical conditions, particularly soil quality and lack of water for irrigation, onset of agricultural estates was delayed.

=== Livestock breeding and early agriculture ===
In Yucatán, the first regions where haciendas were established were adjacent or near the capital of Mérida along the main roads and the highway between Campeche and Mérida. Predominantly from the sixteenth to the eighteenth centuries there was no large scale production and the haciendas were strictly for raising livestock, which did not require concentrations of labor. Agricultural production was limited to feeding the livestock. From the middle of the eighteenth century to the mid-nineteenth century commercial agriculture was introduced because of growing urban demand and rising profitability potential. Initially the crop grown was maize, but increasingly the change was made to henequen production, in the cases of the estates of Itzincab, San Antonio Sodzil, Temozón, Uayalceh, Xtepen, and Yaxcopoil, among others.

In areas farther from Mérida, sugar cane and livestock breeding were more prevalent. The Caste War of Yucatán, which began around 1847, destroyed much of the sugar industry in the southern and eastern parts of the peninsula. The invention of the mechanical scraper in 1852 for pulping and high demand for rope, convinced farm owners throughout the state of Yucatán to switch to the production of sisal, though the north and northwest part of the state is typically known as the "henequen zone".

Between 1868 and 1871 steam-driven machinery began being imported to process sugar. Many of these "powerhouses" on the haciendas were later converted to process sisal. Approximately 160 machines were imported. Some of the largest were for the haciendas of Uayalceh, Miraflores and Acu, all with 20 horsepower motors; Yaxcopoil with a 16 horsepower motor; Xcehus with a 14 horsepower motor; Lepan, Sodzil, Mukuiché; and with 10 horsepower motors: Canicab, Cheumán, Humchectamán, ltzincab, San Antonio Ool, San Bernardo, San Ignacio, Santa Maria, Tankuché, Tecoh, Texan, Teya, Ticopó, Tzitz, Xcucul, Xcuyun, Xtabay, and Yaxché.

=== Henequen boom ===
Previous to the emergence of the henequen industry, landowners lived in Mérida and treated their landholdings as occasional retreats. With the emergence of henequen and the wealth it produced, the farms were transformed into haciendas which typically had a grand manor house, the machine house, and a chapel. Because a large population was needed to take care of the properties, workers were provided with housing and the amenities of a community. The foreman usually has his own home, and there were storage buildings, the hydraulics or pump house, a school, an infirmary, a store, the stables and a jail.

Servants on the estates lived in a situation that was very similar to that of the bonded serfdom of the peasants of medieval Europe. They were not slaves, as they retained some civil rights, but they were not free, as they were bound to the land, forced to serve against their will, and in the absence of any type of currency at the governmental level were paid in hacienda tokens. These coins were issued by the hacienda owners to pay workers, but could only be exchanged for goods on the hacienda or at the "company store". As there were perpetual labor shortages, indentured servants were also brought in from China, Korea and the Canary Islands. In addition to their cultivation of the fields, workers were required to provide unpaid labor for the tasks necessary to keep the hacienda running. On Hacienda Kochol, workers performed "faginas" twice a day, which included tasks like building repair and construction, grounds maintenance, and road clearing and repair.

The era of the henequen boom from the late 1800s to the early 1900s was known as the time of "green gold". At the height of the boom, there were nearly 1,200 haciendas within an 80 km radius around the city of Mérida. The haciendas changed the development of Mérida, as many of them became what are neighborhoods of the city. Hacienda San Cosme is now Colonia García Ginerés; Hacienda Tecoh covered what now makes up Colonia San José Tecoh, Colonia Castilla Cámara, Colonia Mercedes Barrera, Cinco Colonias and the Fraccionamiento Zacil Ha; Hacienda San Isidro is now Colonia Melitón Salazar; Hacienda San Diego Azcorra is now Colonia Azcorra, Colonia Miraflores, Colonia Unidad Habitacional Morelos, Colonia Morelos Oriente and Colonia Salvador Alvarado Sur; Hacienda Wallis is now Colonia Chuminópolis and Colonia La Esperanza; Haciendas Petcanché and Hacienda Chichí Suárez are now Colonia Jesús Carranza, Colonia Miguel Alemán, and Colonia Chichí Suárez, just to name a few.

=== Bust and after-effects ===
The wealth from the boom paid for city streets as well as public buildings, spaces and services, which increased the population of the city tremendously. When the Mexican Revolution arrived in Yucatán around 1915, some of the hacendados chose to abandon their holdings. Others who had borrowed during the boom and overinvested, were unable to repay after the bust, when the sisal prices declined after the stock market crash of 1929. The Great Depression which followed the 1929 crash caused declining exports worldwide. However, because the boom had diversified the economy, built infrastructure and connected the haciendas with the city, when people relocated to the city during the bust seeking work, the housing demands on the city were minimized, as the close-in haciendas transformed into neighborhoods.

All of the henequen plantations ceased to exist as autonomous communities with the agrarian land reform implemented by President Lazaro Cardenas in 1937. His decree turned the haciendas into collective ejidos, leaving only 150 hectares to the former landowners for use as private property. Lack of knowledge of how to run a business and poor management on behalf of some of the collectives led to further declines in the industry. In the mid-1940s, when synthetic fibers were invented, the henequen industry plummeted further.

== Preservation of heritage within the Mérida Municipality ==
In the 1990s, some of the Yucatán haciendas recovered their economic growth and appeal, as hotels and resorts. Of the 105 Municipalities in the state, only Mérida has to date taken measures to preserve the hacienda heritage. The City of Mérida initiated a project in 1996 to identify the former haciendas in the immediate metropolitan area. 51 have been classified to date and of that 51, 48 have declared Cultural Heritage Areas and divided into 6 zones. The designation offers additional protections to historic haciendas, even if they already have some federal protections. In these zones land use, construction and demolition are highly regulated to protect the historical context.

=== Central metropolitan zone ===
Fifteen haciendas have been identified within the Central Metropolitan Zone: Hacienda Anikabil, Hacienda Chenkú, Hacienda Misné, Hacienda Mulsay de la Magdalena, Hacienda Multunkuc, Hacienda Petcanché, Hacienda San Agustín de Pacabtún, Hacienda San Antonio Cucul, Hacienda San Diego Azcorra, Hacienda San Juan Bautista Tzeal, Hacienda San Pedro Chukuaxín, Hacienda Tanlum, Hacienda Vista Alegre, Hacienda Wallis and Hacienda Xoclán.

=== North zone ===
The Northern Zone, which contains the area lying between the City of Mérida and the Port of Progreso contains fourteen registered haciendas: Hacienda Dzibilchaltún, Hacienda Dzidzilché, Hacienda Kikteil, Hacienda Sac-Nicté, Hacienda San Antonio Hool, Hacienda Santa Gertrudis Copó, Hacienda Santa María Yaxché, Hacienda Sodzil Norte, Hacienda Tamanché, Hacienda Temozón Norte, Hacienda Tixcuytún, Hacienda Xcanatún, Hacienda Xcumpich, and Hacienda Xcunyá.

=== Northwest zone ===
The Northwest Zone, heading out towards Caucel, has three haciendas: Hacienda Cheumán, Hacienda Noc-Ac and Hacienda Suytunchén.

=== Southwest zone ===
The Southwest Zone stretching from Mérida towards the Umán Municipality has four identified haciendas: Hacienda Chalmuch, Hacienda Opichén, Hacienda Susulá, and Hacienda Tixcacal.

=== South zone ===
The Southern Zone, containing the area between Mérida and Abalá and Tecoh and moving toward the east between Mérida and Timucuy and Kanasín contains eleven protected haciendas: Hacienda Hunxectamán, Hacienda Petac, Hacienda San Antonio Tahdzibichén, Hacienda San Ignacio Tesip, Hacienda San Matías Tzacalá, Hacienda San Nicolás Dzoyaxché, Hacienda San Pedro Chimay, Hacienda Santa Cruz Palomeque, Hacienda Texán Cámara, Hacienda Xmatkuil, and Hacienda Yaxnic.

=== East zone ===
The Eastern Zone heading in the direction of Sitpach contains four registered haciendas: Hacienda Chichí Suárez, Hacienda Oncán, Hacienda Santa María Chí, and Hacienda Yaxché Casares.

== Driving tours ==
In areas farther afield from Mérida, driving routes have emerged to market closely located haciendas to tourists. One route to the southwest of Mérida near Uman, groups Hacienda Ochil, Hacienda Temozón Sur and Hacienda Yaxcopoil. Another route, to the east toward Valladolid and Cancun includes Hacienda San Ildefonso Teya, Hacienda San José Cholul and Hacienda Chichén. A third route is the 7 haciendas which make up the Cuxtal Ecological Reserve.

== See also ==
- List of haciendas of Yucatán
