= Umán =

- City
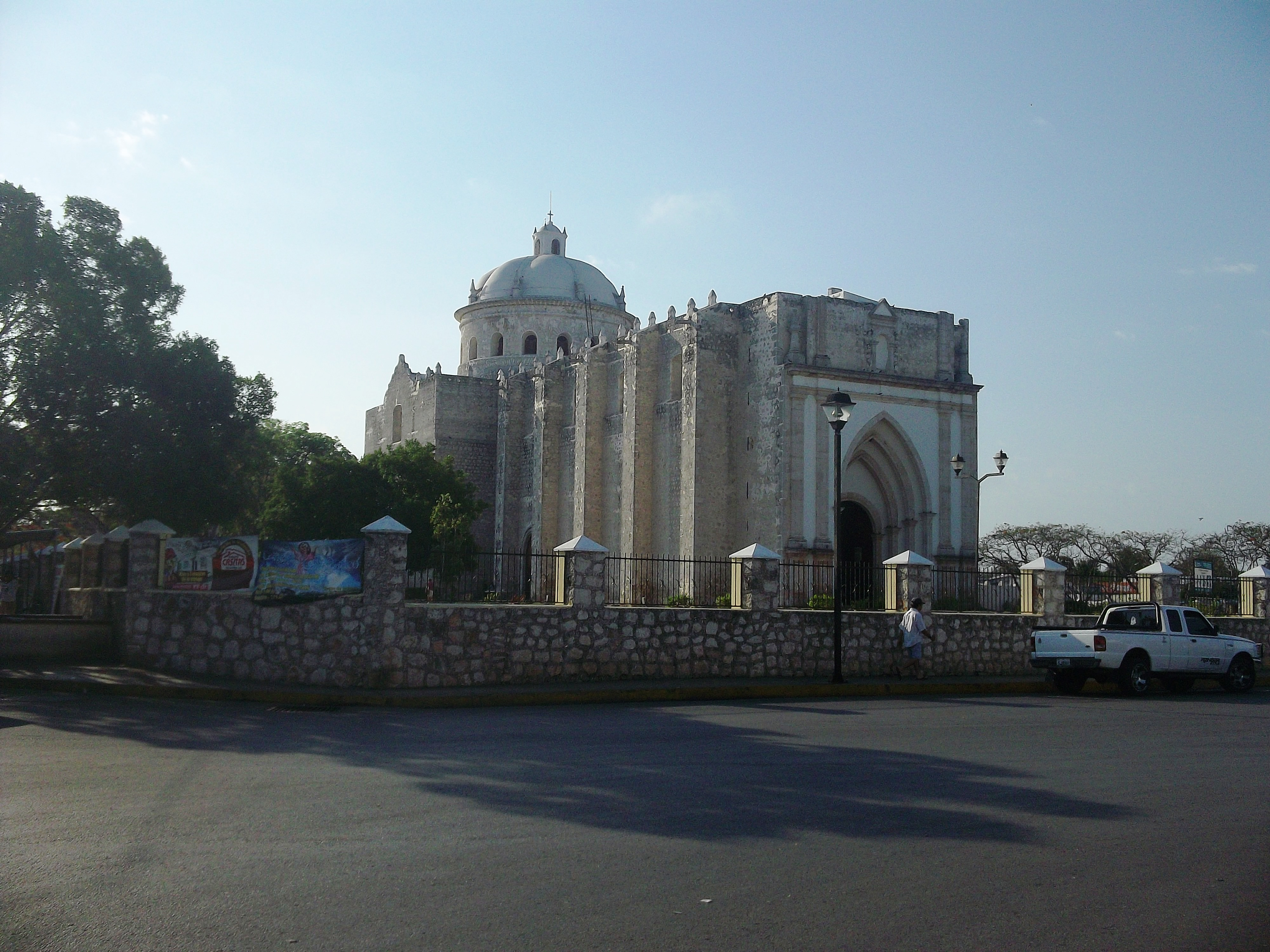
- Principal Church of Umán, Yucatán

- Location of Umán Umán (Mexico)
- Coordinates: 20°53′N 89°45′W
- Country: Mexico
- State: Yucatán
- Municipality: Umán Municipality
- Municipality Est: 1921
- Elevation: 9 m (30 ft)

Population (2020)
  - Total: 56,049
  - Demonym: Umanense
- Time zone: UTC-6 (Central Standard Time)
- Postal Code: 97390
- Area code: 988
- INEGI Code: 101
- Major Airport: Merida (Manuel Crescencio Rejón) International Airport
- IATA Code: MID
- ICAO Code: MMMD

Umán is a city in the Mexican state of Yucatán and the municipal seat of the municipality of the same name. Together with Kanasín, it is part of the Mérida metropolitan area. According to the 2020 census, it had a population of 56,409 inhabitants, making it the 4th most populous city in the state behind Valladolid, Kanasín, and Mérida.

== Topynym ==
The word "Umán" means “purchase” in the Yucatec Maya language and it also means "your path" or "your walk".

== History ==
There is no accurate data on when Umán was founded, though it existed before the conquest and in antiquity belonged to the chieftainship of Ah Canul. At colonization, it became part of the encomienda system with Francisco Hernández recorded as one of the earliest encomenderos.

Yucatán declared its independence from the Spanish Crown in 1821 and in 1825, the area was assigned to the Lower Camino Real with its headquarters in Hunucmá Municipality. In 1921, Umán was designated as seat of its own municipality.

== Governance ==
Umán is the seat of its eponymous municipality in which its municipal president is elected for a three-year term. The town council has nine councilpersons, who serve as Secretary and councilors of heritage and sports, policing, education and health, public works, running water, rural development and social management, roads and markets, nomenclature and recruiting, ecology, public monuments.

== Demographics ==
View chart definition.

== Local festivals ==
Every year from 13 to 15 September, Umán holds a celebration for the Christ of Love.

== Tourist attractions ==
- The ex-convent and Church of St. Francis of Assisi, built in the eighteenth century
- Archaeological sites at Bolon, Hotzuc, and Kizil
- Hacienda Xtepén
- Hacienda Yaxcopoil
