= Kanasín =

City in Yucatán, Mexico

- City
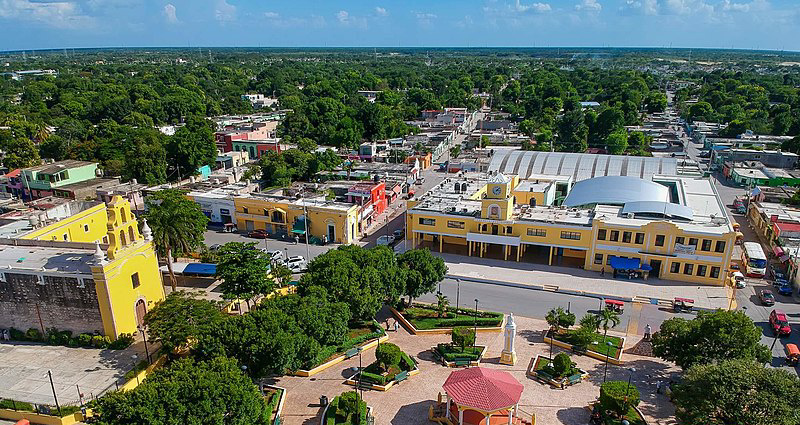
- Main square of Kanasín.

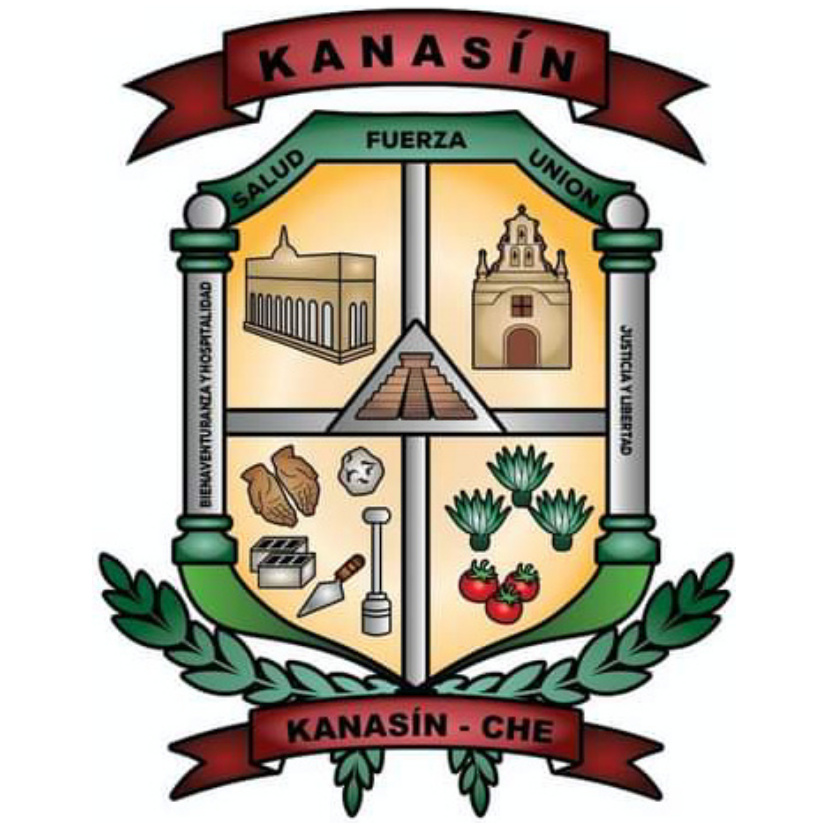
- Seal

- Location of Kanasín Kanasín (Mexico)
- Coordinates: 20°56′04″N 89°33′28″W
- Country: Mexico
- State: Yucatán
- Municipality: Kanasín Municipality
- City established: 1921
- Elevation: 9 m (30 ft)

Population (2020)
  - Total: 139,753
  - demonym: kanasinense
- Time zone: UTC-6 (Central Standard Time)
- Postal Code: 97370
- Area code: 999
- INEGI Code: 041
- Major Airport: Merida (Manuel Crescencio Rejón) International Airport
- IATA Code: MID
- ICAO Code: MMMD

Kanasín (In the Yucatec Maya language: "tense or strongly tightened") is a city in the Mexican state of Yucatán and the municipal seat of the municipality of the same name. It is located in the northwestern region of the state, forming part of the Mérida metropolitan area. According to the 2020 census carried out by the National Institute of Statistics and Geography (INEGI), it had a population of 139,753, making it the second largest Yucatecan city after Mérida, the 8th most populous in southeastern Mexico and the 101st most populous in the country.

In pre-Columbian times, the space that the city currently occupies was located in the ancient Mayan chiefdom of Chakan. Kanasín was established around the mid-16th century under the encomienda tributary system following the Spanish conquest of Yucatán. The name of the city derives precisely from a Mayan language term used to name a plant with reddish flowers that grows in the area. In 2007, it officially received city status. At the end of 2021, it hosted the First Ibero-American Meeting of Poetry. Today, it is a significant development pole as an industrial corridor for the state, together with the nearby city of Umán, which is also a suburb of Mérida.

== History ==
It is unknown which chieftainship the area was under prior to the arrival of the Spanish. After the conquest the area became part of the encomienda system. One of the first encomenderos was Francisco Sosa, with 209 Indians in his charge. Later it passed to Josefa Díaz Bolio, who had care of 211 Indians and then to reverend Sister María Josefa, with 155 Indians.

Yucatán declared its independence from the Spanish Crown in 1821 and in 1825, Kanasín was established as head of its own municipality.

== Governance ==
Kanasín is the municipal seat of its eponymous municipality. Its municipal president is elected for a three-year term. Its town council has nine councilpersons, who serve as Secretary and councilors of policing and neighborhoods, public works, health and ecology, education, culture and sports, public monuments, parks and gardens, transportation, and nomenclature.

The Municipal Council administers the business of the municipality. It is responsible for budgeting and expenditures and producing all required reports for all branches of the municipal administration. Annually it determines educational standards for schools.

The Police Commissioners ensure public order and safety. They are tasked with enforcing regulations, distributing materials and administering rulings of general compliance issued by the council.

== Neighborhoods and subdivisions ==
Kanasín follows a mostly grid-like street layout, being made up of the following neighborhoods and subdivisions:

Neighborhoods

- Andrés Quintana Roo
- Cecilio Chi
- Colibrí
- Croc
- Cuauhtémoc
- El Cerrito
- Flor de Mayo
- Francisco Villa Oriente
- Kanasín Centro
- Leona Vicario
- Mulchechén
- Mulchechén II
- Pedregales del Oriente
- Reparto las Granjas
- San Antonio Kaua III
- San Camilo
- San Haroldo San José Tzal
- Santa Isabel
- Xelpac

Subdivisions

- Arboleda Kanasín
- Arecas
- Cielo Alto
- Condesa
- Coyoles
- Despertare
- El Encanto Kanasín
- Fontana I
- Girasoles
- Héctor Victoria
- Jardines de Kanasín
- Jardines de Mulchechén
- Jardines de San Pedro Noh Pat
- La Ceiba
- La Joya
- La Piedra
- Las Flores
- Las Haciendas
- Las Palmas Yucatán
- Las Palmeras
- Las Perlas
- Los Encinos
- Los Pinos de Mulchechén
- Los Robles
- Los Robles III
- Los Tulipanes
- Pablo Moreno
- Palmas San Pedro
- Pedregales de Kanasín
- Pedregales de Kanasín II
- Privada del Sol
- Puerta del Sol
- Puerta Esmeralda
- Residencial
- Rinconada Kanasín
- San Ignacio
- San José Kanasín
- Santa Ana
- Santa Cecilia
- Valle Azul
- Valle Oriente
- Valle Oriente de San Pedro Noh Pat
- Villa Bonita
- Villa Mercedes
- Villas del Oriente
- Villas Turquesa
- Vivah

== Demographics ==
View chart definition.

== Local festivals ==
- 8 December Celebration to honor the Immaculate Conception
- 29 January to 2 February Feast of the Virgin de la Candelaria
- March Popular carnival

== Tourist attractions ==
- Church of San José, built in the seventeenth century
- Hacienda San Ildefonso Teya
