= Kanasín Municipality =

Municipality in the Mexican state of Yucatán

- Municipality
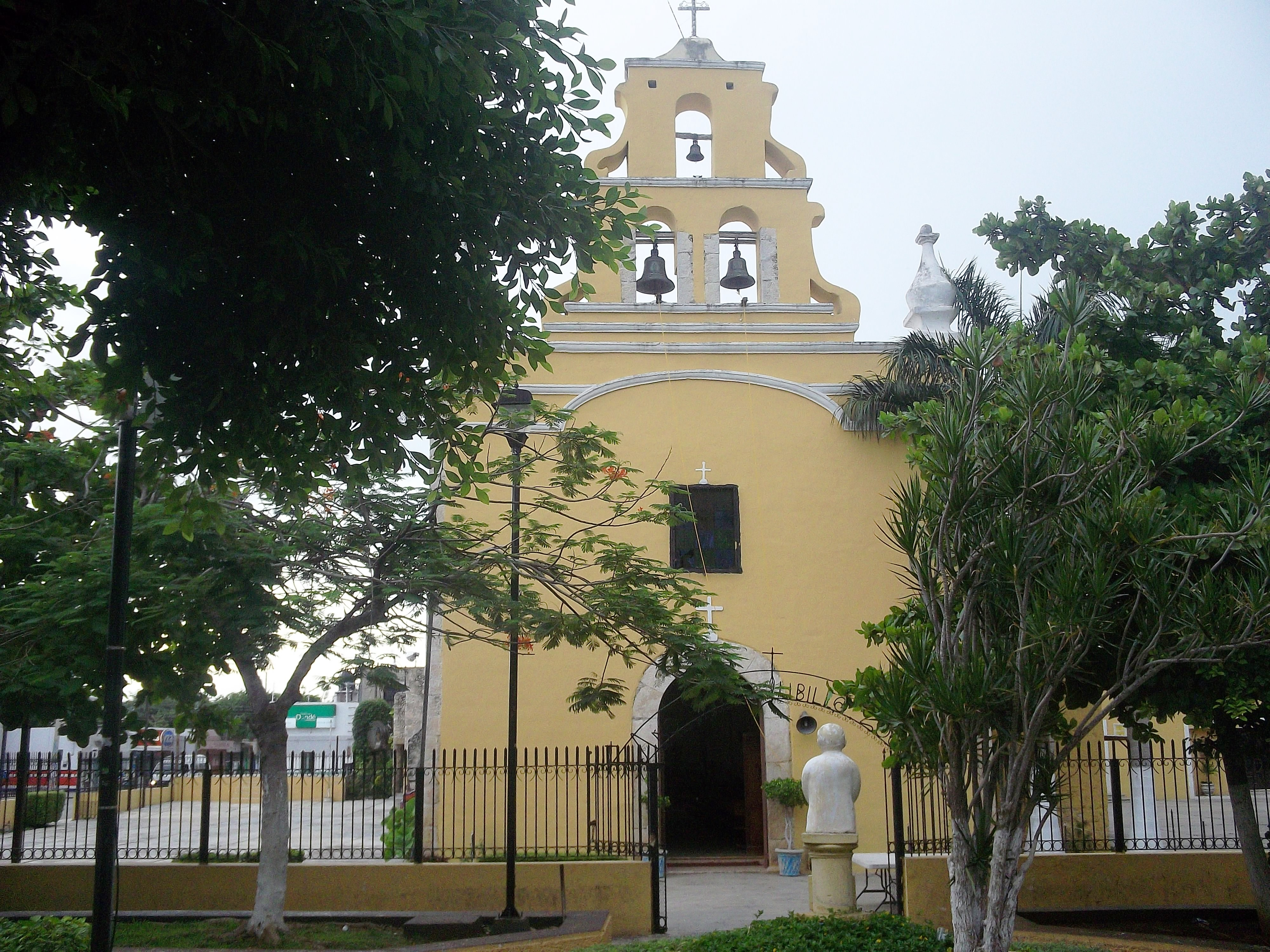
- Principal Church of Kanasín, Yucatán

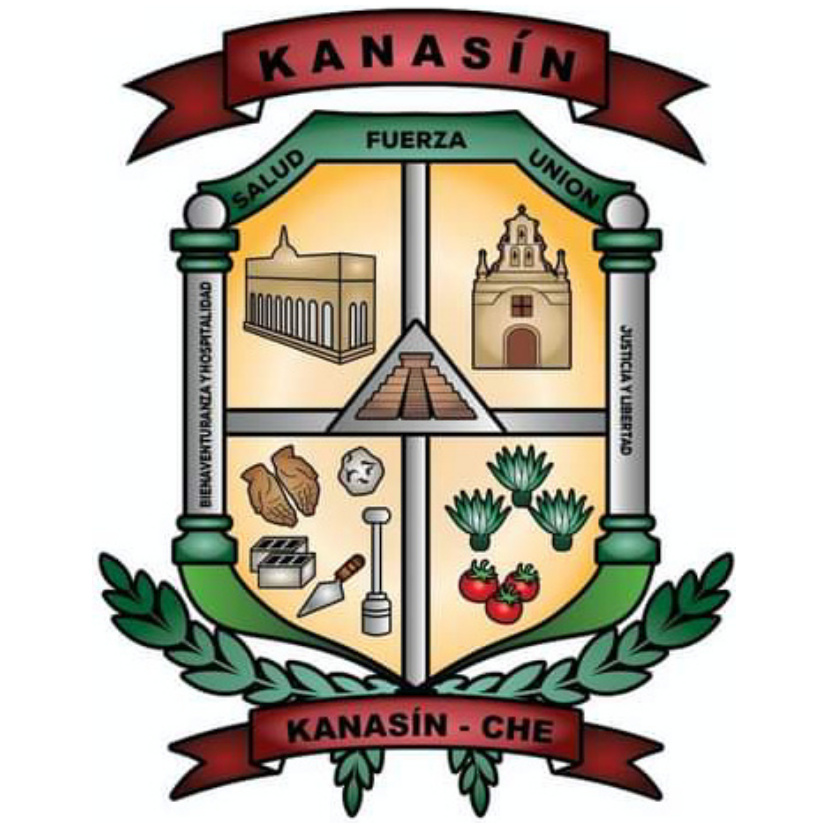
- Coat of arms

- #041 in the northwest region

- Location of the Municipality in Mexico
- Coordinates: 20°56′N 89°34′W
- Country: Mexico
- State: Yucatán
- City established: 1921

Government
  - Type: 2012–2015
  - Municipal President: Carlos Fernando Andrade Muñoz

Area
  - Total: 72.81 km^{2} (28.11 sq mi)
- Elevation: 10 m (33 ft)

Population (2020)
  - Total: 141,939
  - demonym: kanasinense
- Time zone: UTC-6 (Central Standard Time)
- Postal Code: 97370
- Area code: 999
- INEGI Code: 041
- Major Airport: Merida (Manuel Crescencio Rejón) International Airport
- IATA Code: MID
- ICAO Code: MMMD

Kanasín Municipality (In the Yucatec Maya Language: "tense or strongly tightened") is a municipality in the Mexican state of Yucatán containing 72.81 km^{2} of land and located roughly 5 km east of the city of Mérida.

== History ==
It is unknown which chieftainship the area was under prior to the arrival of the Spanish. After the conquest the area became part of the encomienda system. One of the first encomenderos was Francisco Sosa, with 209 Indians in his charge. Later it passed to Josefa Díaz Bolio, who had care of 211 Indians and then to reverend Sister María Josefa, with 155 Indians.

Yucatán declared its independence from the Spanish Crown in 1821 and in 1825, Kanasín was established as head of its own municipality.

== Governance ==
The municipal president is elected for a three-year term. The town council has nine councilpersons, who serve as Secretary and councilors of policing and neighborhoods, public works, health and ecology, education, culture and sports, public monuments, parks and gardens, transportation, and nomenclature.

The Municipal Council administers the business of the municipality. It is responsible for budgeting and expenditures and producing all required reports for all branches of the municipal administration. Annually it determines educational standards for schools.

The Police Commissioners ensure public order and safety. They are tasked with enforcing regulations, distributing materials and administering rulings of general compliance issued by the council.

== Communities ==
The head of the municipality is Kanasín, Yucatán. There are 76 inhabited places in the municipality. Some of the more important ones include Habal, Mulchechén, San Antonio Tehuitz, San Antonio Xiol, San Pedro Nóhpat, and Teya. The significant populations are shown below:

Community	Population
Entire Municipality (2010)	78,709
Kanasín	50,357 in 2005
San Antonio Tehuitz	732 in 2005
Teya	554 in 2005

Other localities:

- San Bernardino

== Local festivals ==
- December 8 Celebration to honor the Immaculate Conception
- January 29 to February 2 Feast of the Virgin de la Candelaria
- March Popular carnival

== Tourist attractions ==
- Church of San José, built in the seventeenth century
- Hacienda San Ildefonso Teya
