= San Bernardino, Yucatán =

Human settlement in Yucatán, Mexico

Coordinates: 20°53′N 89°24′W

San Bernardino is a village in Kanasín Municipality, in the state of Yucatán, Mexico.
