= Hacienda Chichí Suárez =

- Private Residence
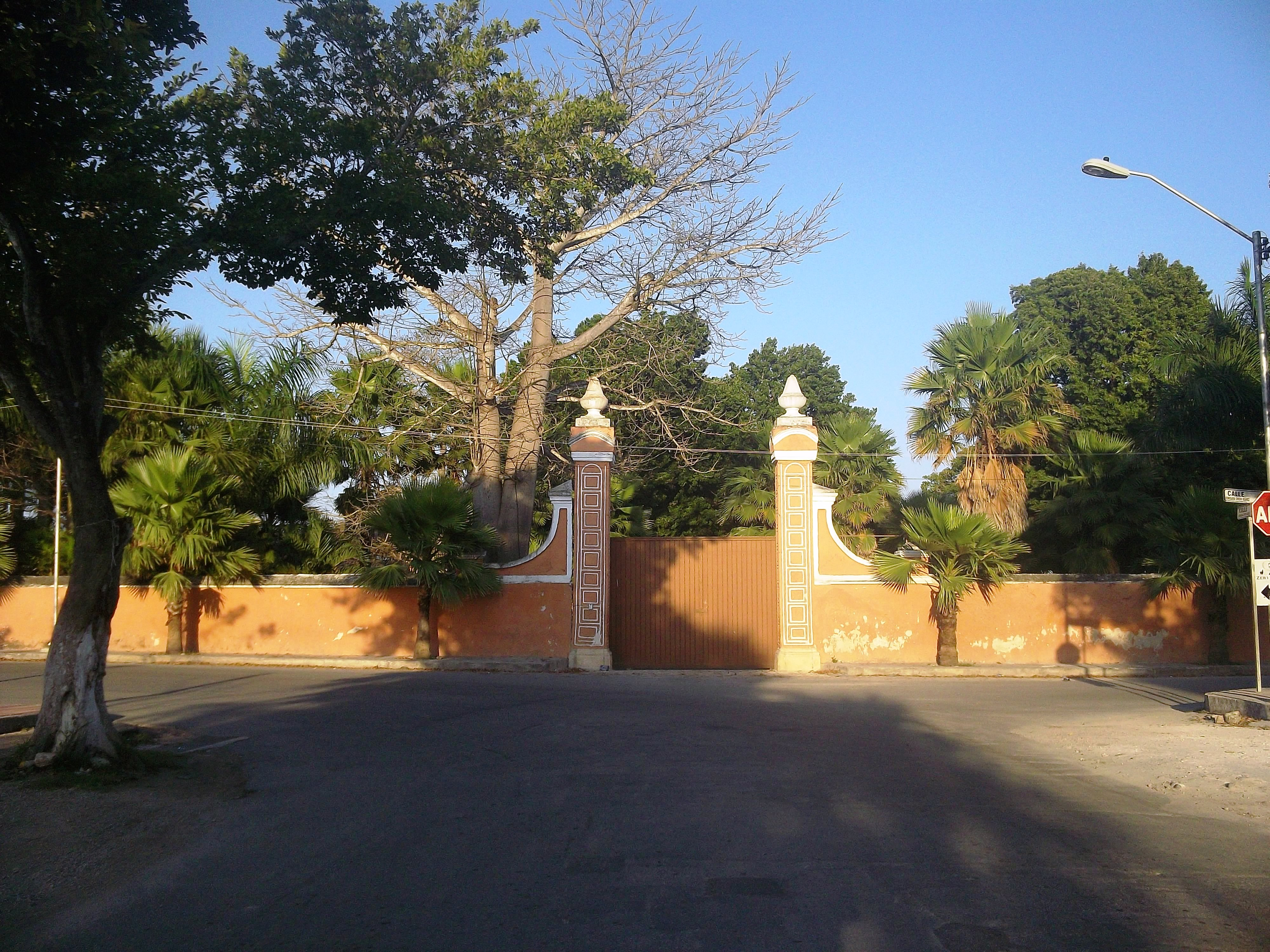
- Entrance Hacienda Chichí Suárez, Yucatán.

- Location in Mexico
- Coordinates: 20°59′57″N 89°33′08″W
- Country: Mexico
- Mexican States: Yucatán
- Municipalities: Mérida Municipality
- Time zone: UTC−6 (CST)
  - Summer (DST): UTC−5 (CDT)
- Postal code: 97306
- Area code: 999

Hacienda Chichí Suárez is located in the Mérida Municipality in the state of Yucatán in southeastern Mexico. It is one of the properties that arose during the nineteenth century henequen boom. It was founded by a Spanish conquistador, owned by the grandson of the founder of Mérida and at least two governors of the State of Yucatán. The home is one of the oldest structures in Mérida.

== Toponymy ==
The name (Chichí Suárez) is a combination of Maya and Spanish terms. Chichí is a word from the Mayan language meaning grandmother and Suárez, a Spanish surname, and the name of one of the former owners.

== How to get there ==
The property is located in northeastern Mérida to the east of the Periférico at the intersection of Calle 35 with Calle 14 in Colonia Chichí Suárez.

== History ==
The hacienda was founded in the sixteenth century by the conquistador Alonso de Rosado and is one of oldest farms in Yucatán. The property changed ownership several times but was eventually sold by Catarina de Andrade to the grandson of Francisco de Montejo the Younger, Juan de Montejo Maldonado. He sold it in 1640 to Antonio de Figueroa y Silva Lasso de la Vega Ladrón del Niño de Guevara the liberator of what is now Belize from England and Governor of Yucatán.

In 1919, another Yucatecan governor, Olegario Molina acquired the property which was called Santa María Chichí at that time. The property changed hands several times after 1922 and in 1948 was acquired by Víctor Suárez Molina, who renamed it to Hacienda Chichí Suárez. In 1953, he sold the property to Omar G. Díaz y Díaz.

It is available for rent for private parties, tours and photography sessions.

== Architecture ==
The Hacienda Chichí Suárez is mentioned in a 17th-century deed as consisting of two stone houses with straw roofs, a church, a well and troughs for animals. The buildings are neoclassical in design and have a long corridor of arches supported by slender columns. Some parts of it have been restored, but other parts are in ruin. A particular decorative element, the shield of Captain General Antonio de Figueroa y Silva Lasso de la Vega Ladrón del Niño de Guevara, who owned the house in the 17th century, is featured on the interior walls.

== Demographics ==
All of the henequen plantations ceased to exist as autonomous communities with the agrarian land reform implemented by President Lazaro Cardenas in 1937. His decree turned the haciendas into collective ejidos, leaving only 150 hectares to the former landowners for use as private property. Figures before 1937 indicate populations living on the farm. After 1937, figures indicate those living in the community, as the remaining Hacienda Chichí Suárez houses only the owner's immediate family.

According to the 1980 census conducted by the INEGI, the population of the city was 700 inhabitants, of whom 369 were men and 331 were women. Since that time, the inhabitants are enumerated in the City of Mérida figures.

Population of Chichí Suárez by year
Year	1900	1910	1921	1930	1940	1950	1960	1970	1980
Population	215	248	242	233	273	342	400	575	700

== Bibliography ==
- Bracamonte, P and Solís, R., Los espacios de autonomía maya, Ed. UADY, Mérida, 1997.
- Gobierno del Estado de Yucatán, "Los municipios de Yucatán", 1988.
- Kurjack, Edward y Silvia Garza, Atlas arqueológico del Estado de Yucatán, Ed. INAH, 1980.
- Patch, Robert, La formación de las estancias y haciendas en Yucatán durante la colonia, Ed. UADY, 1976.
- Peón Ancona, J. F., "Las antiguas haciendas de Yucatán", en Diario de Yucatán, Mérida, 1971.

== Photo gallery ==
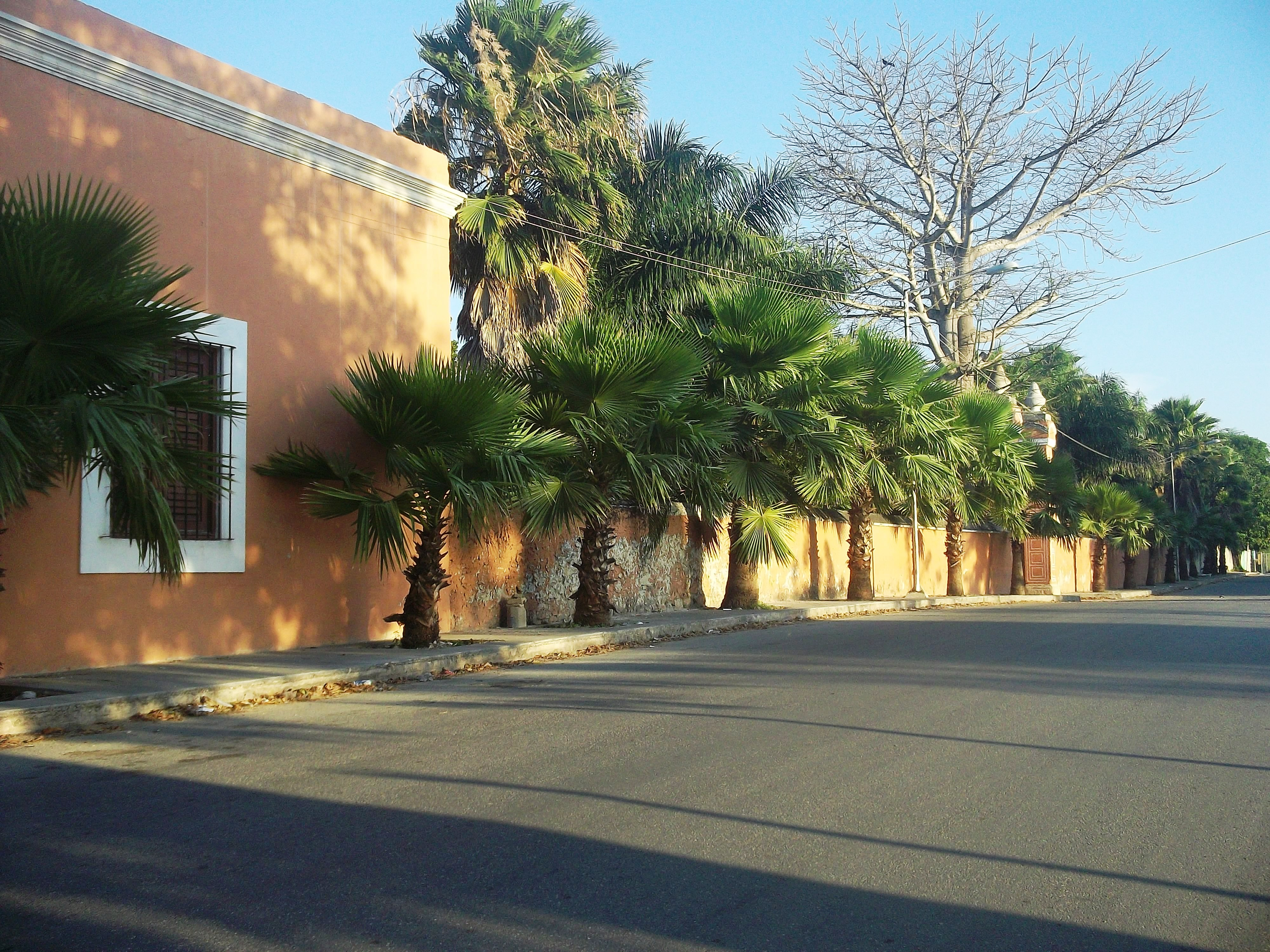
Main House of the Hacienda Chichí Suárez.

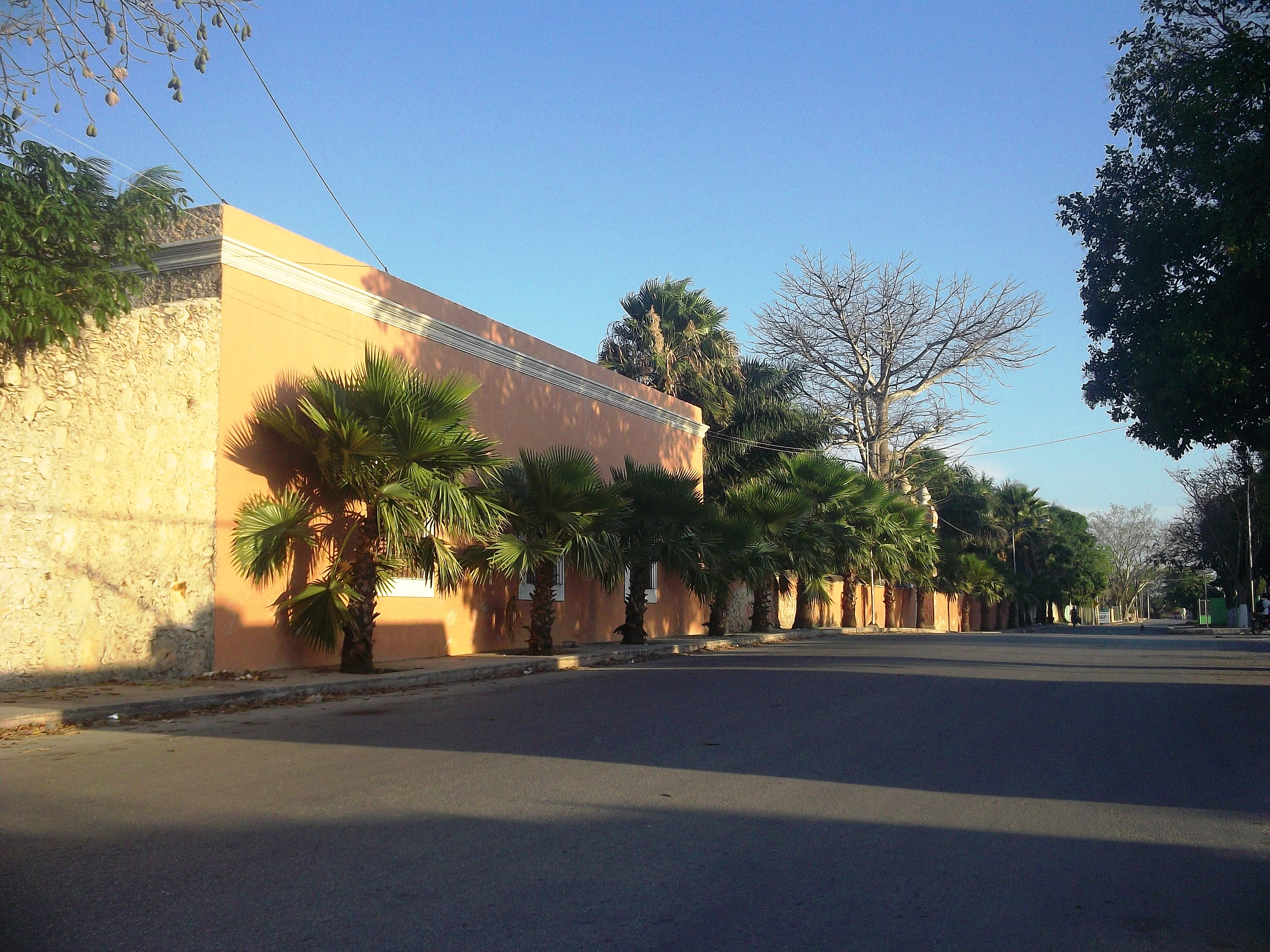
Main House of the Hacienda Chichí Suárez.

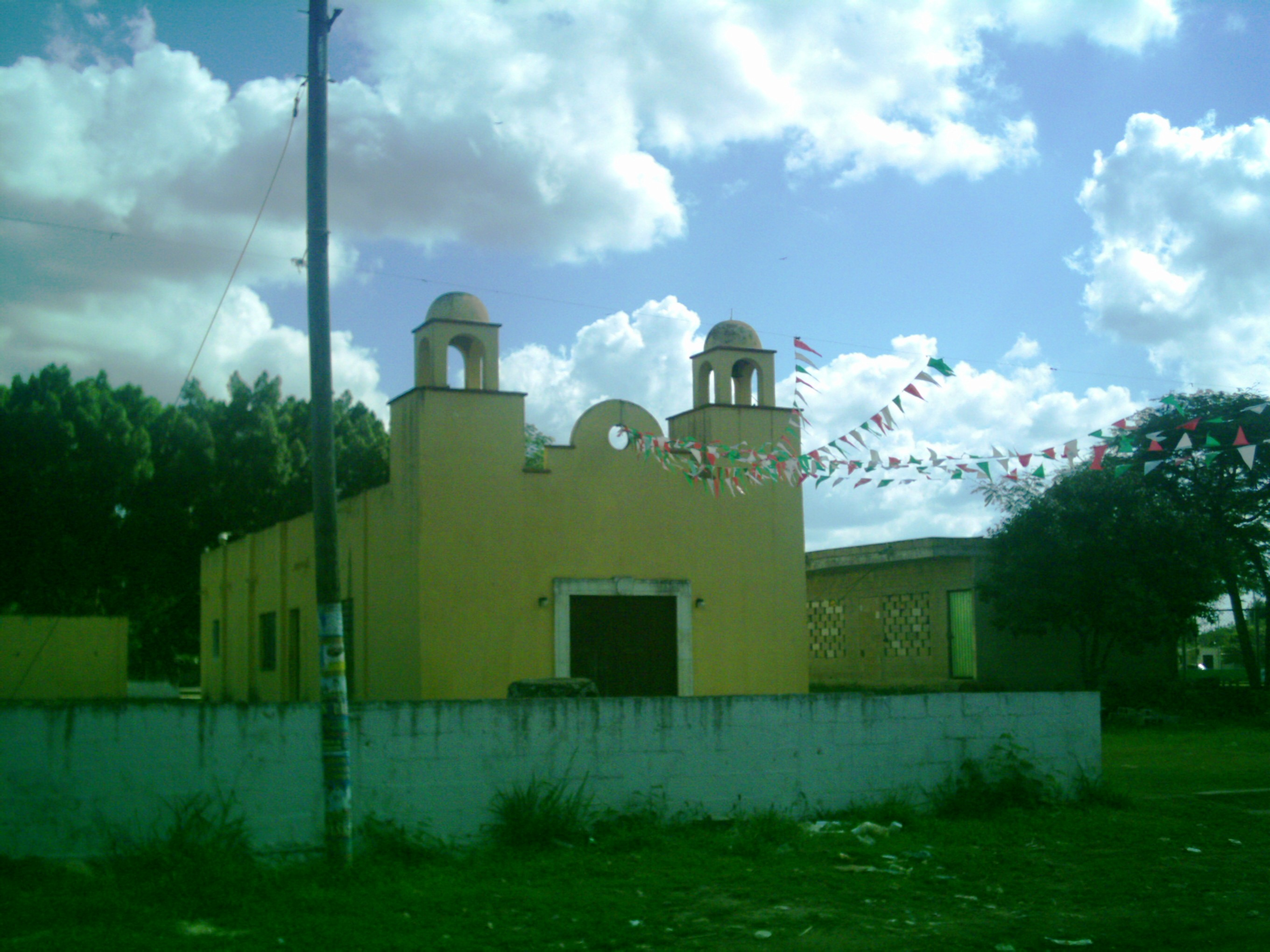
Church of the Hacienda Chichí Suárez.

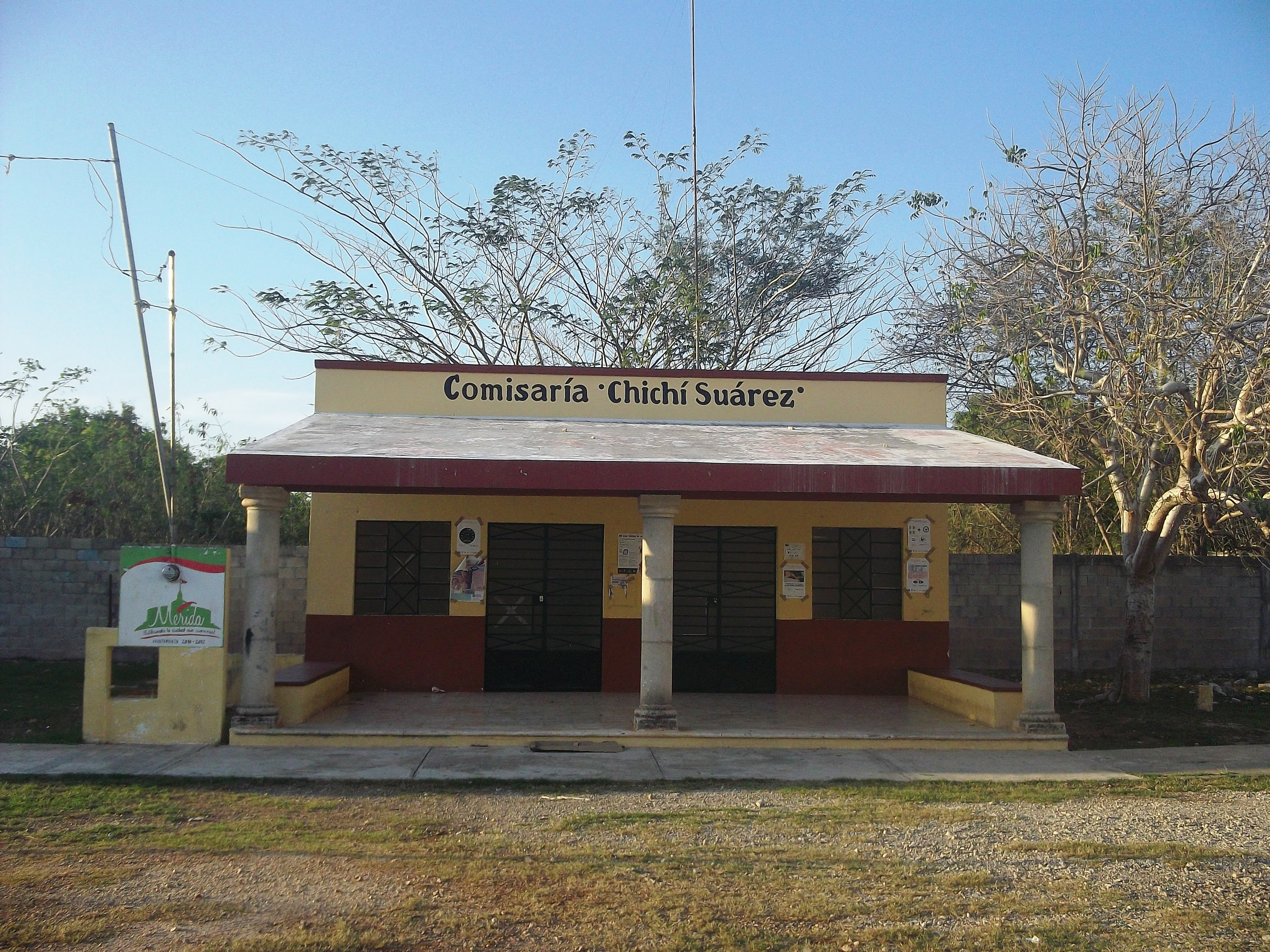
Company Store of the Hacienda de Chichí Suárez.

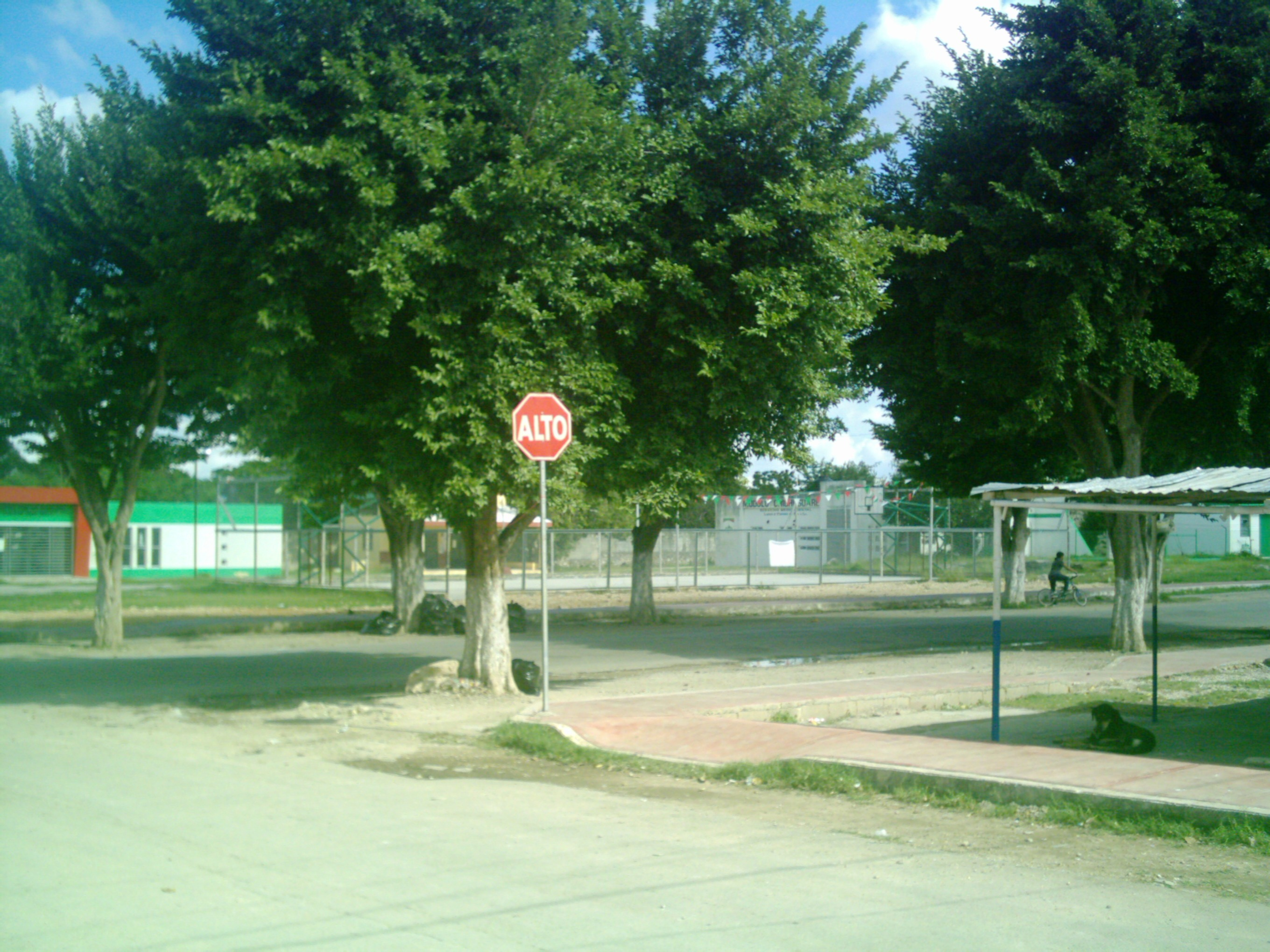
Principal park of the Hacienda Chichí Suárez.

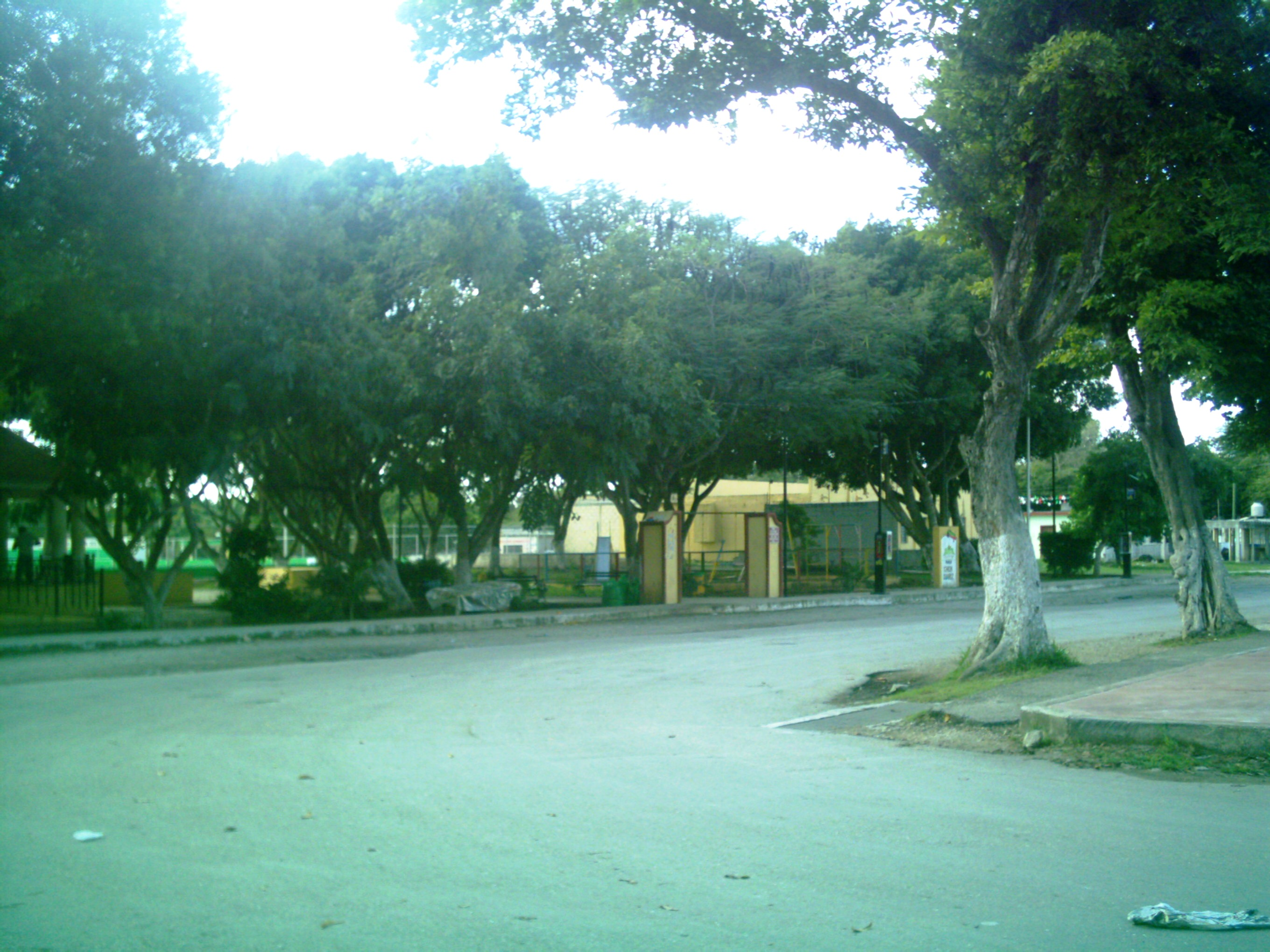
Principal park of the Hacienda Chichí Suárez.

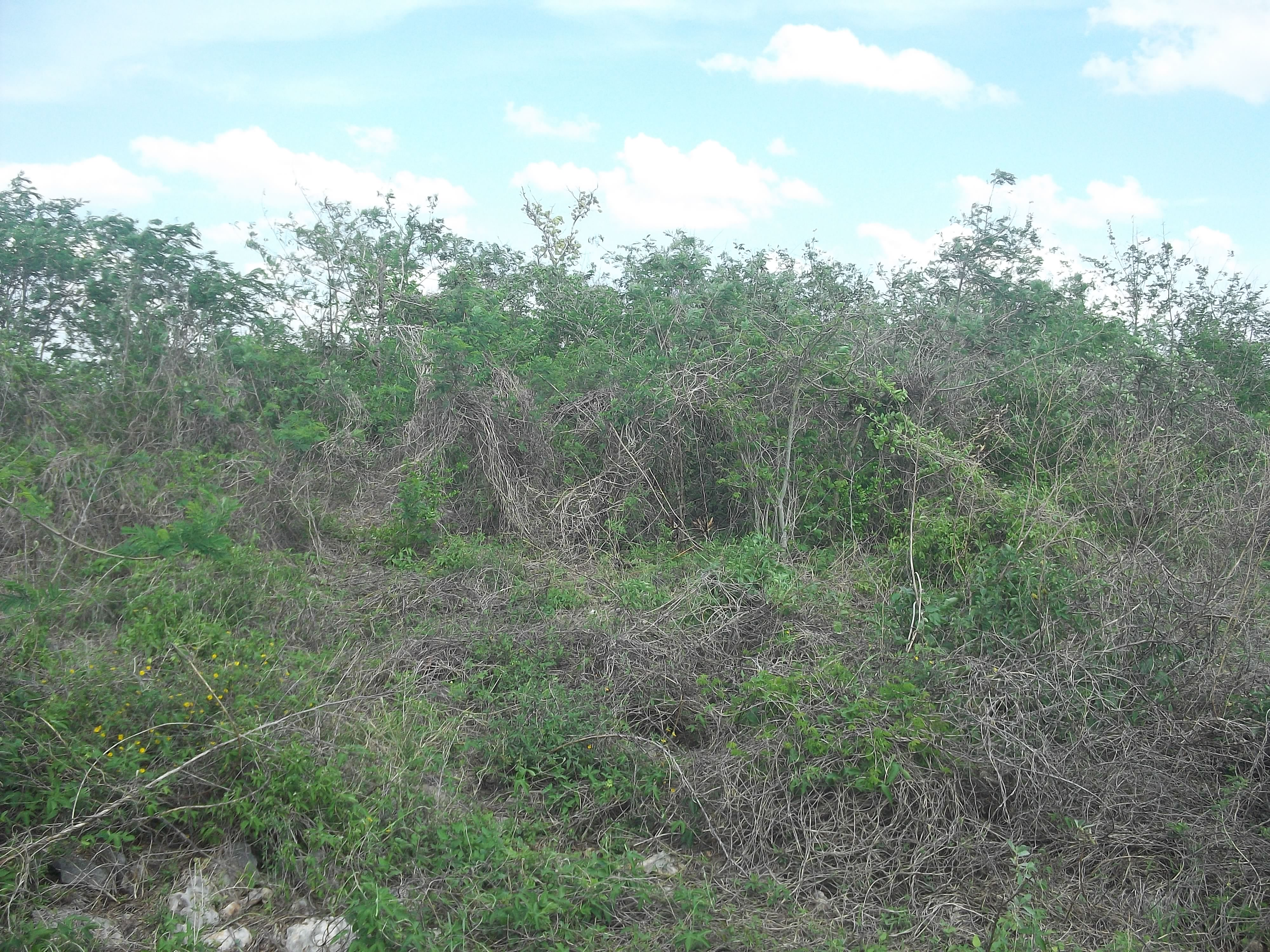
View of the archaeological site around Hacienda Chichí Suárez.

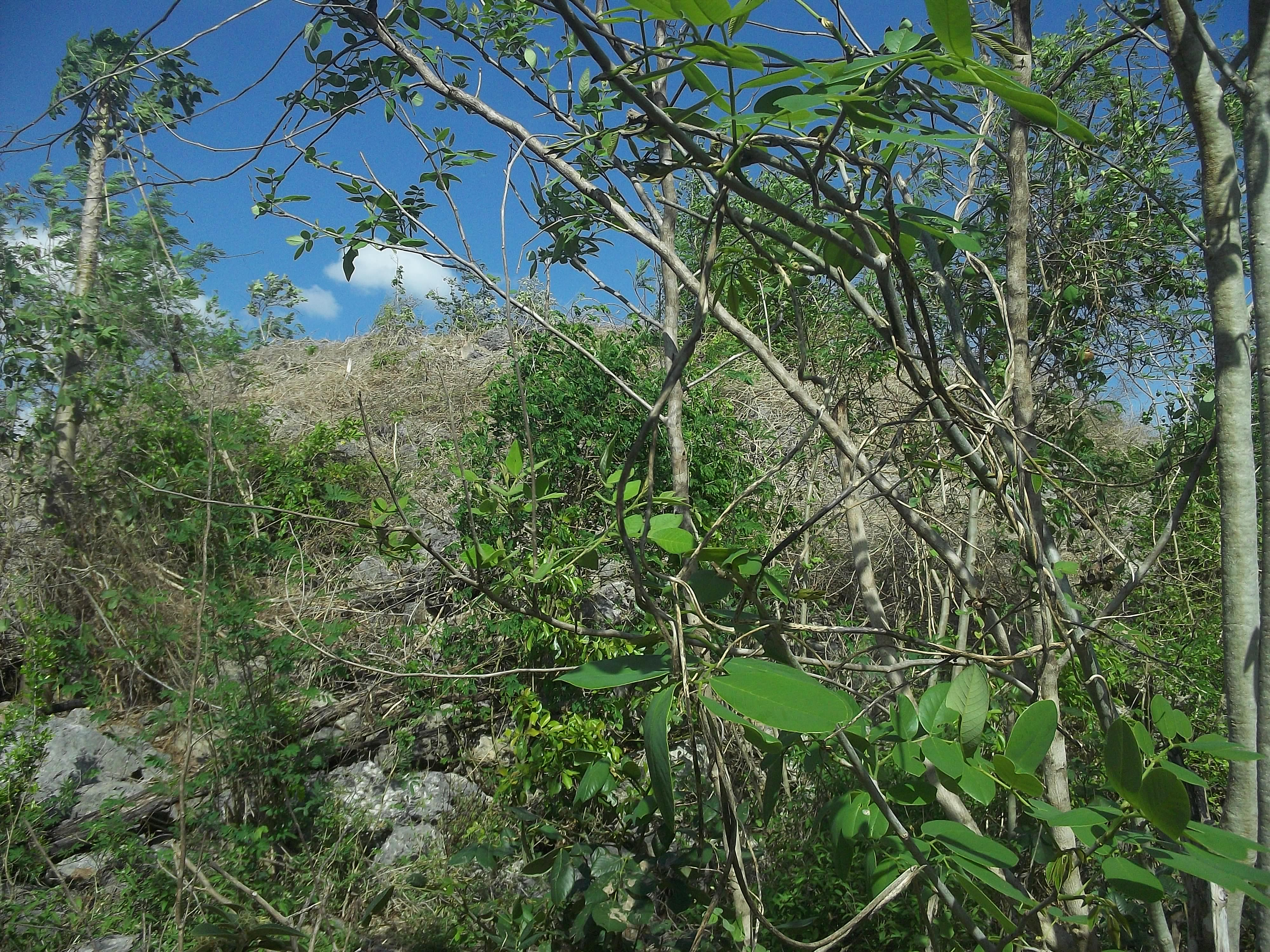
View of the archaeological site around Hacienda Chichí Suárez.

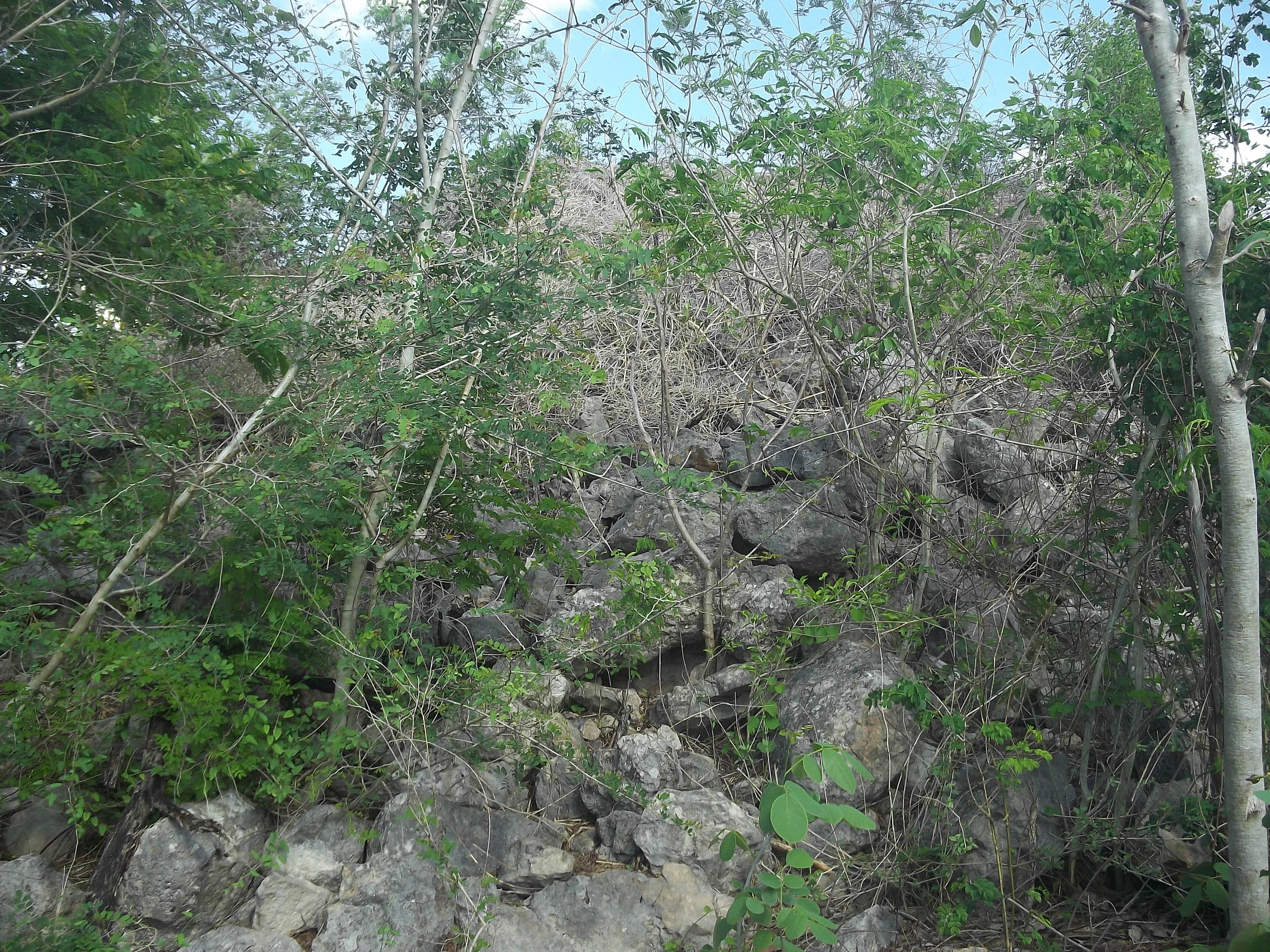
View of the archaeological site around Hacienda Chichí Suárez.

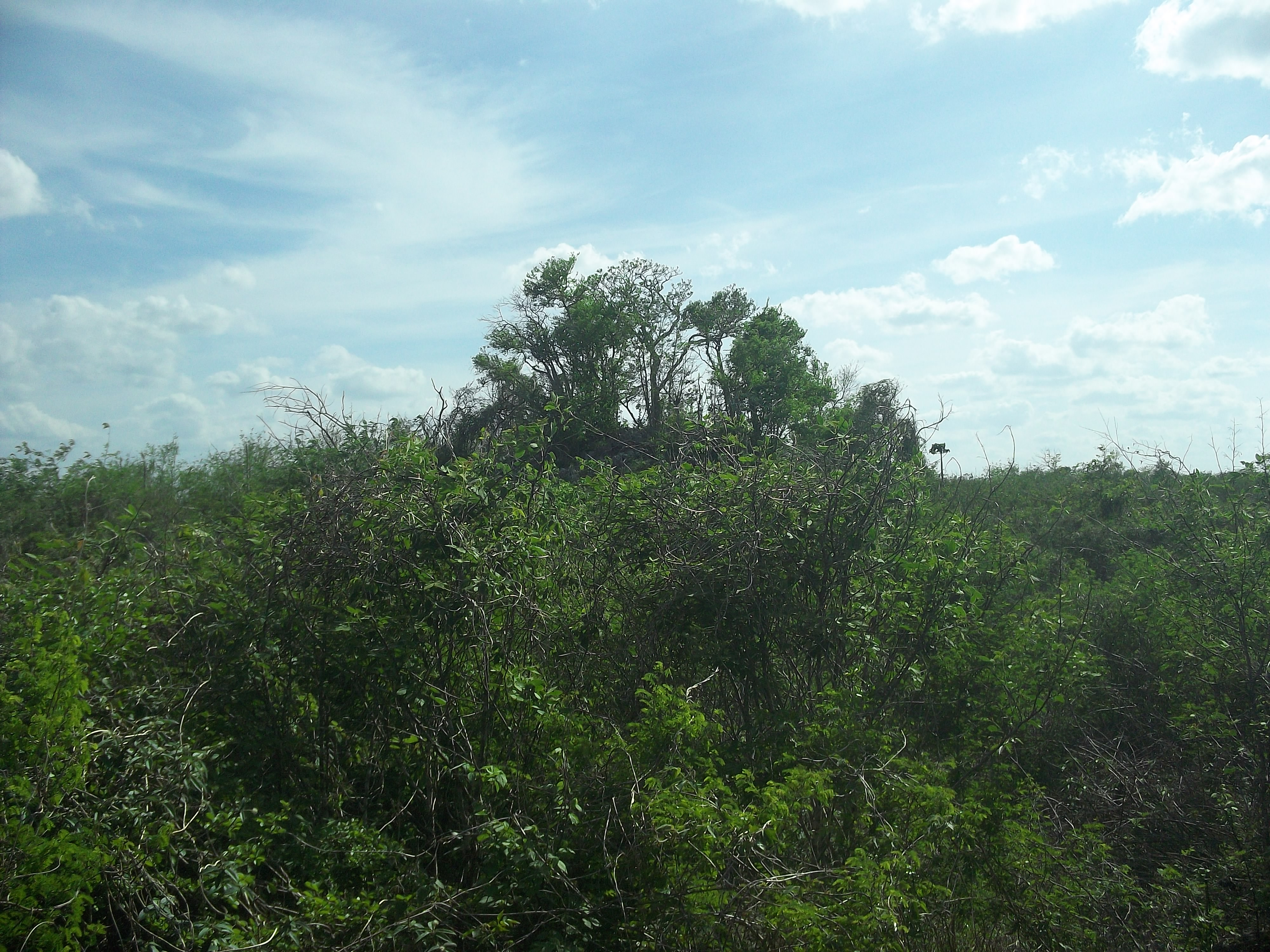
View of the archaeological site around Hacienda Chichí Suárez.

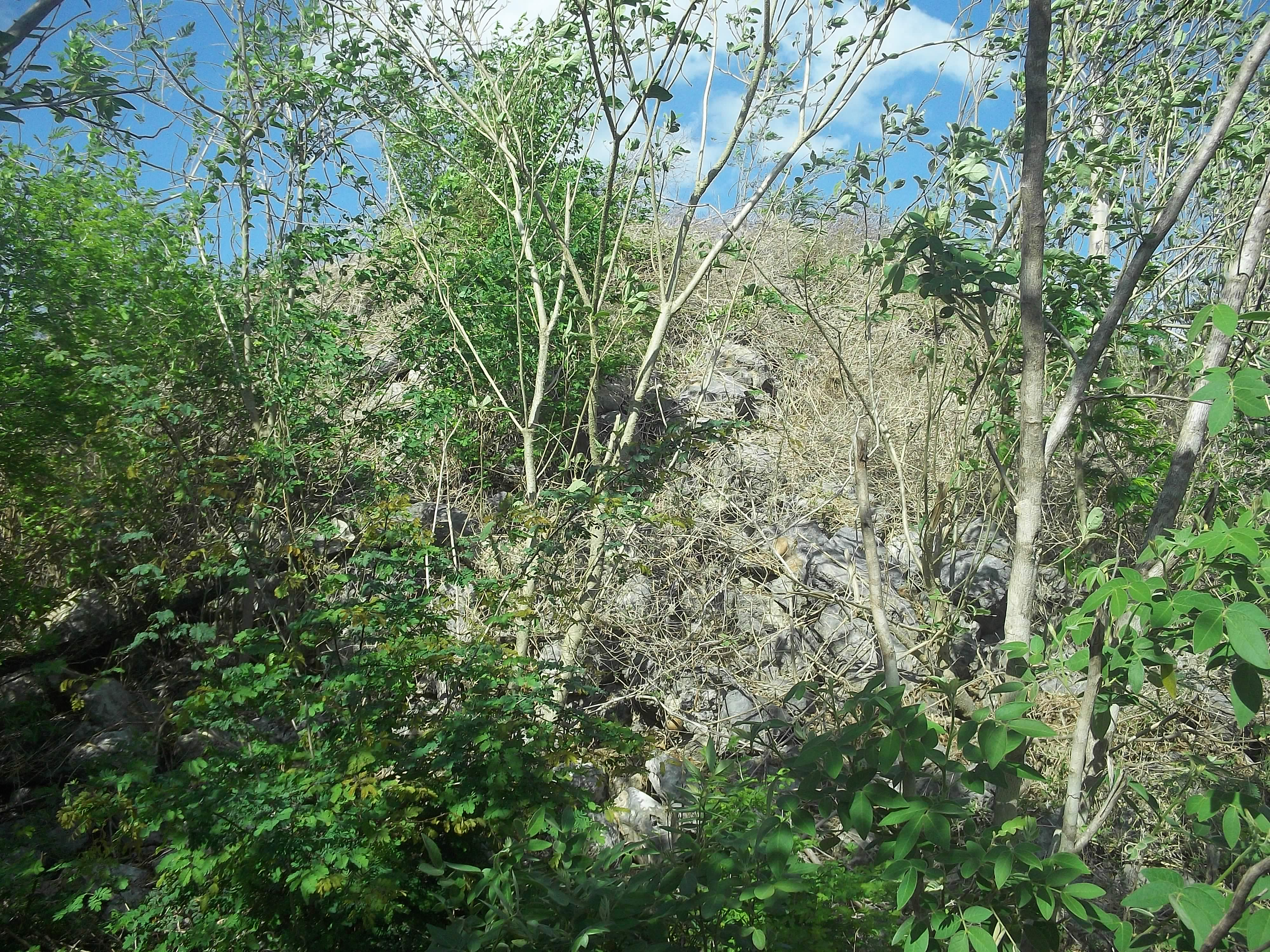
View of the archaeological site around Hacienda Chichí Suárez.

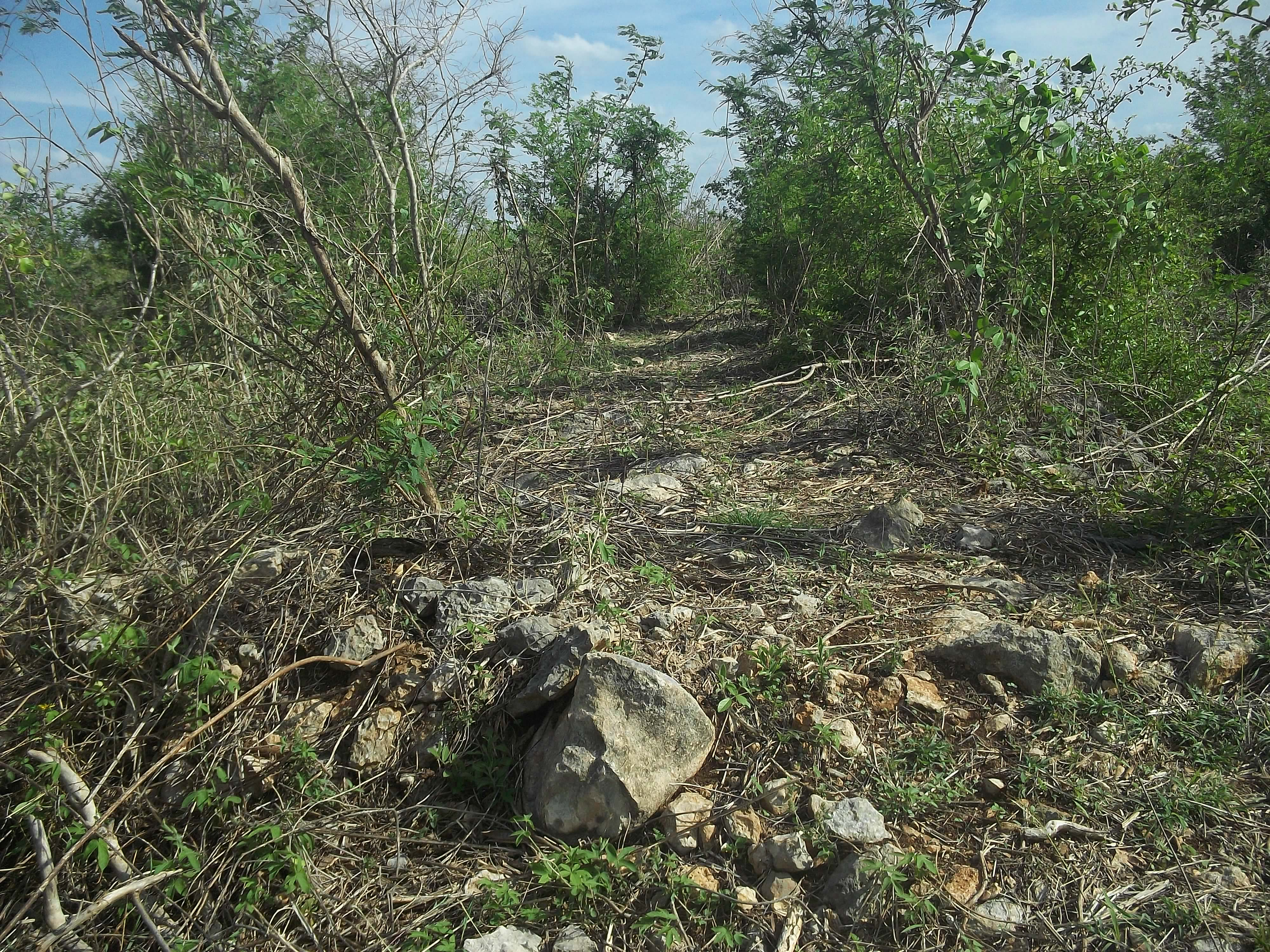
View of the archaeological site around Hacienda Chichí Suárez.
