= Hacienda San Ildefonso Teya =

- Hotel / Restaurant
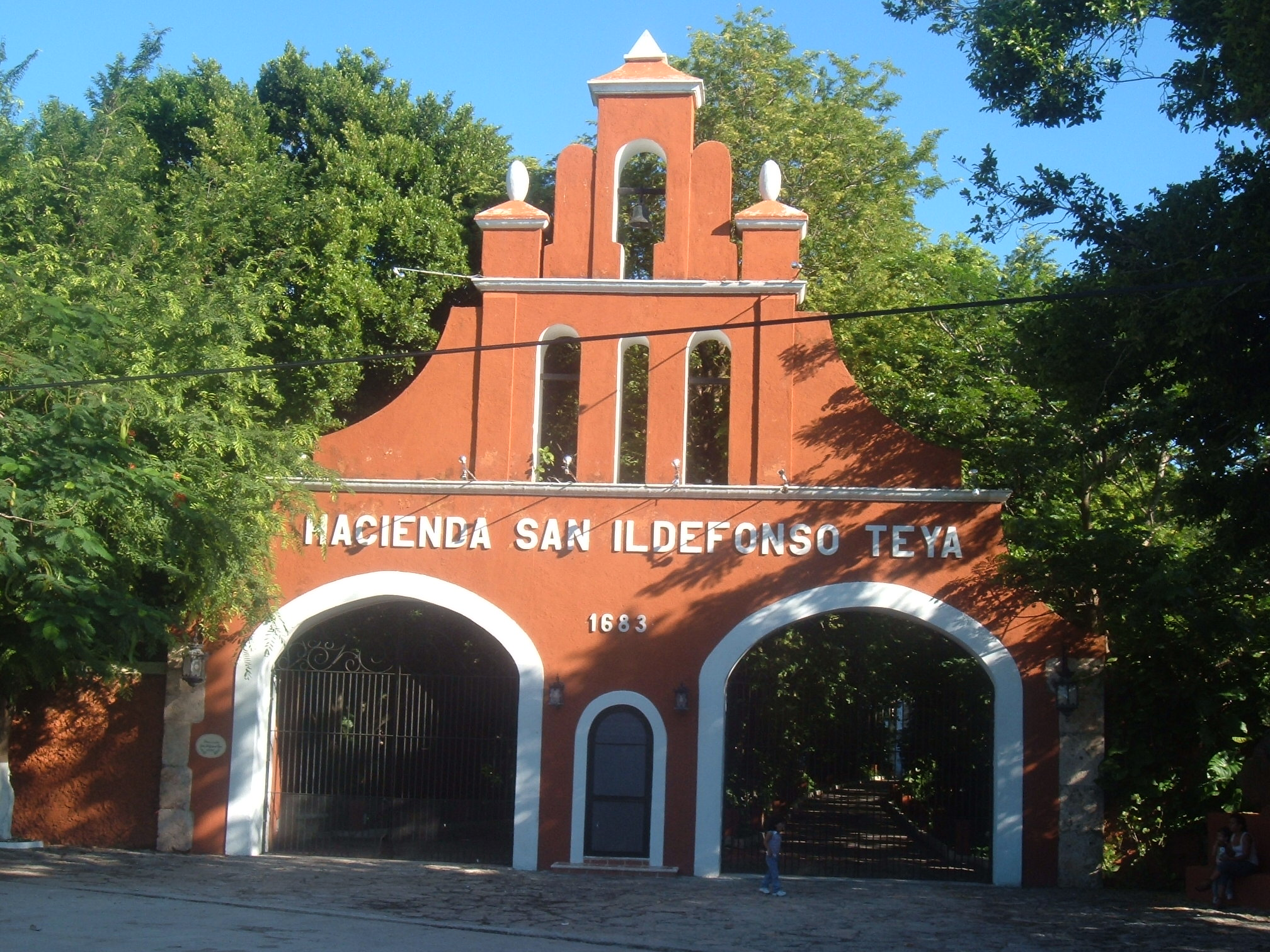
- Entrance Hacienda Teya, Yucatán.

- Location in Mexico
- Coordinates: 20°56′04″N 89°31′26″W
- Country: Mexico
- Mexican States: Yucatán
- Municipalities: Kanasín Municipality
- Time zone: UTC−6 (CST)
  - Summer (DST): UTC−5 (CDT)
- Postal code: 97650
- Area code: 991

Hacienda San Ildefonso Teya (aka Hacienda Teya) is located in the Kanasín Municipality in the state of Yucatán in southeastern Mexico. During the seventeenth century it was one of the largest and most profitable cattle ranches in Yucatán. It was converted to agriculture and during the nineteenth century was part of the henequen boom. The hacienda has been restored and converted into a hotel, restaurant and tourist center.

== Toponymy ==
The name (San Ildefonso Teya) comes from Spanish and the Mayan language. San Ildefonso is the name of the saint who is the patron of the chapel and Teya, is the Maya name for the sapadilla tree or Manilkara zapota.

== How to get there ==
Teya is located off of the Mérida-Cancún highway at Kilometer 12.5.

== History ==
Hacienda Teya was founded in 1683 by Ildefonsa Antonia Marcos Bermejo Calderón y de la Helguera, the wife of the Count of Miraflores. For two centuries it was a livestock plantation before converting to grow maize and then henequen. During the 17th century, Teya, and the Nohpat estancia, located in Umán, were the largest and most profitable haciendas in Yucatán.

In 1874, the owner Manuel Ávila died and a new owner Joaquín Mendiola took over the property. In 1915, the owner, Alfredo Medina, was ordered to give a piece of land to the agrarian committee of Kanasín for the benefit of residents who had no plots for cultivation of their own grain or for cutting firewood.

It had been abandoned and in 1974 was purchased by Jorge Cárdenas Gutiérrez. From 1987-1991, Cárdenas reconstructed and restored the property into a hotel and restaurant.

== Architecture ==
San Ildefonso Teya has retained its colonial style and has some neoclassical influences, probably added in later times. The main house has a wide entering staircase flanked by two arches. This detail is repeated in the interior and at the entrance to the main courtyard.

The dungeon, has been converted to a wine cellar and the old powerhouse has been modified into a ballroom. There is both a small chapel dedicated to San Antonio and the larger chapel which has served for celebrations and Masses.

Along the interior corridors and in the hallways is an exhibit of photographs which have been collected over the last century, showing the history of the home. There are also images showing before and after pictures of the renovation.

== Demographics ==
All of the henequen plantations ceased to exist as autonomous communities with the agrarian land reform implemented by President Lazaro Cardenas in 1937. His decree turned the haciendas into collective ejidos, leaving only 150 hectares to the former landowners for use as private property. Figures before 1937 indicate populations living on the farm. After 1937, figures indicate those living in the community, as the remaining Hacienda San Ildefonso Teya houses only the owner's immediate family.

According to the 2005 census conducted by the INEGI, the population of the city was 554 inhabitants, of whom 278 were men and 276 were women.

Population of Teya by year
Year	1900	1910	1921	1930	1940	1950	1960	1970	1980	1990	1995	2000	2005
Population	221	104	81	147	163	173	213	294	301	359	432	469	554

== Bibliography ==
- Bracamonte, P and Solís, R., Los espacios de autonomía maya, Ed. UADY, Mérida, 1997.
- Gobierno del Estado de Yucatán, "Los municipios de Yucatán", 1988.
- Kurjack, Edward y Silvia Garza, Atlas arqueológico del Estado de Yucatán, Ed. INAH, 1980.
- Patch, Robert, La formación de las estancias y haciendas en Yucatán durante la colonia, Ed. UADY, 1976.
- Peón Ancona, J. F., "Las antiguas haciendas de Yucatán", en Diario de Yucatán, Mérida, 1971.

== Photo gallery ==
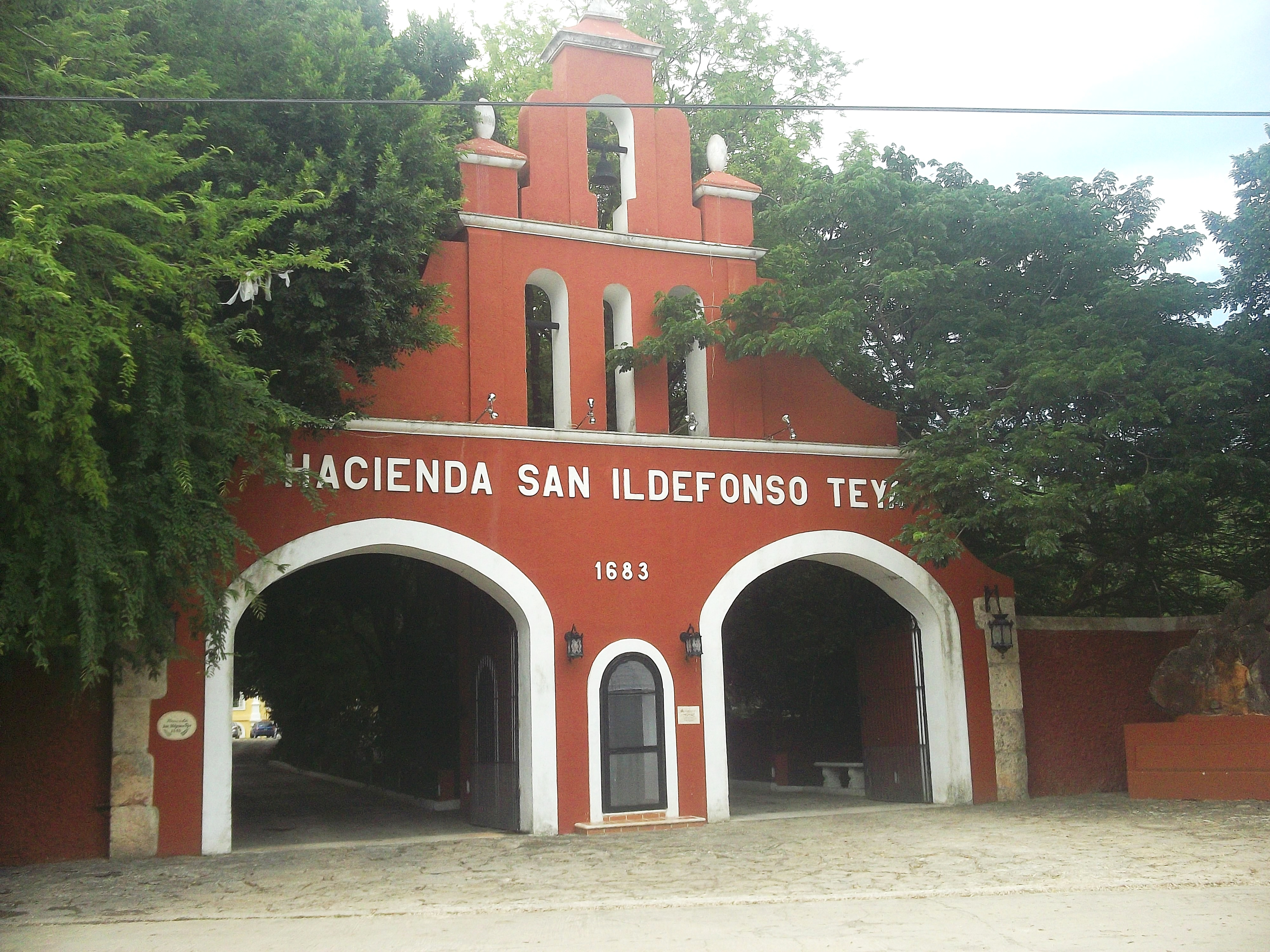
Hacienda San Ildefonso Teya

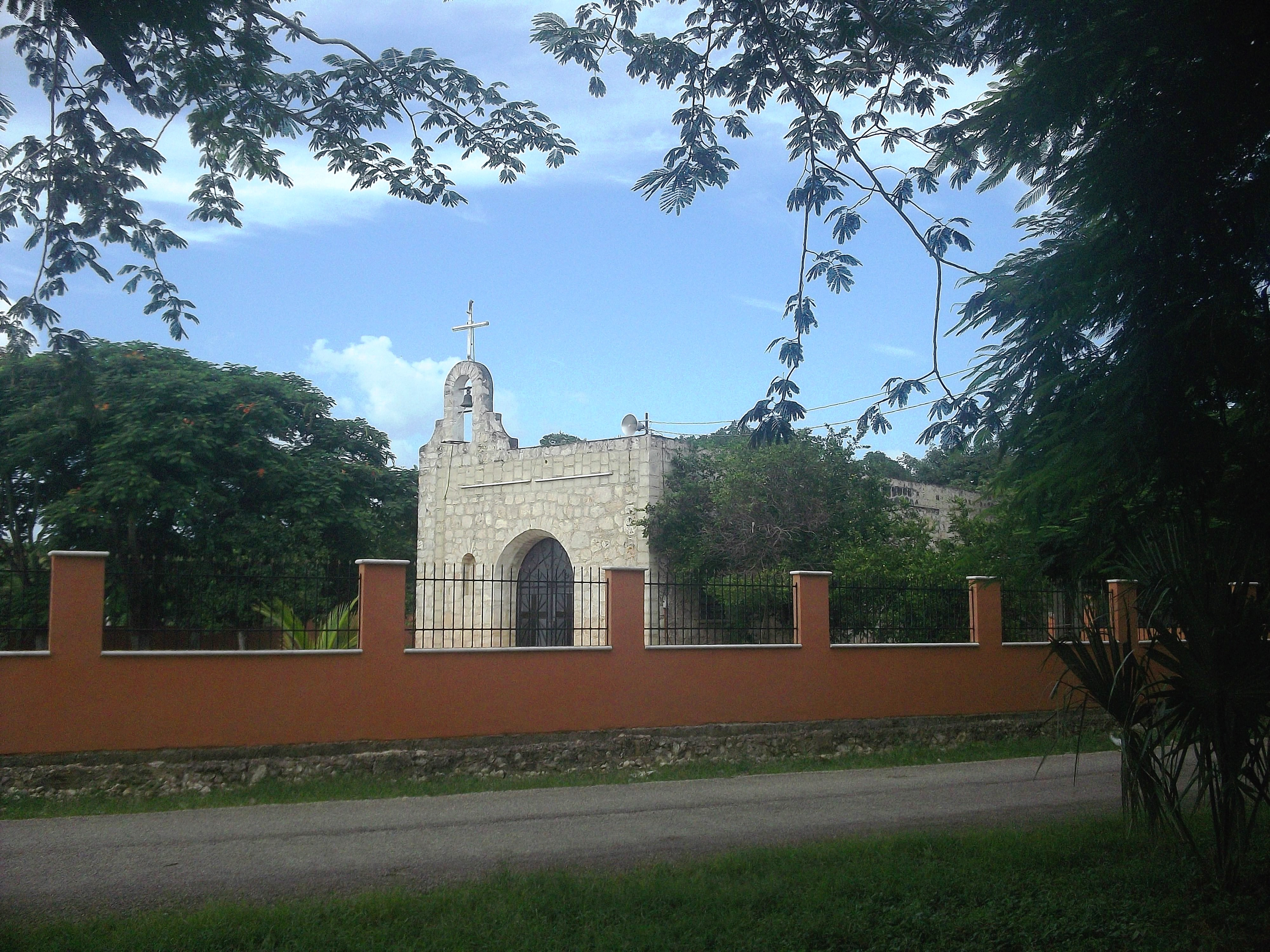
Chapel at Hacienda San Ildefonso Teya
