= Yaxcopoil =

Coordinates: 20.8207°N 89.7421°W

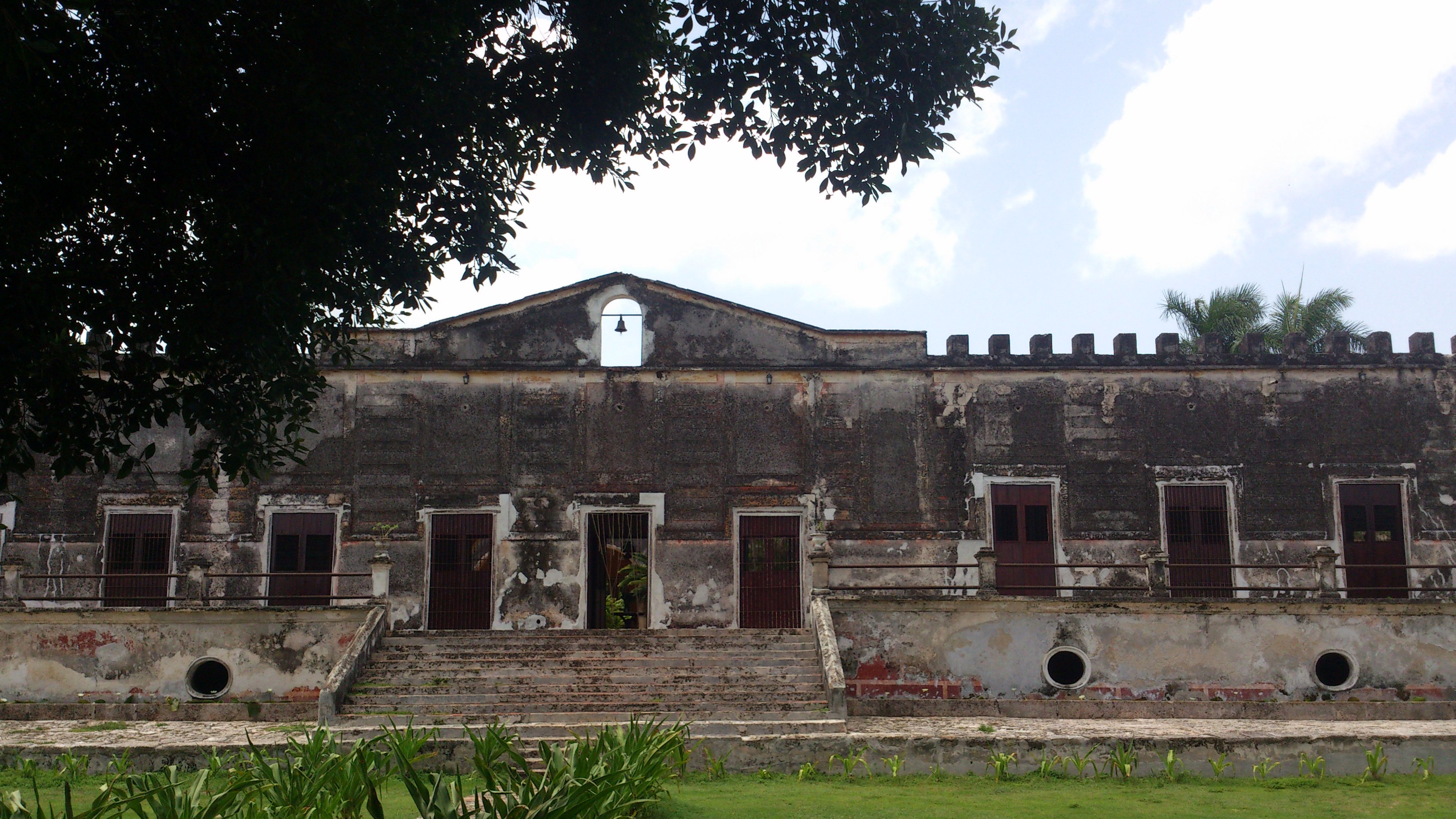
Hacienda Yaxcopoil.

Hacienda Yaxcopoil (YASH-coh-poh-EEL) is a town and hacienda located near Mérida in the Umán Municipality, Yucatán, Mexico. Hacienda Yaxcopoil dates back to the 17th century, the name Yaxcopoil means "the place of the green alamo trees" in the Yucatec Maya language, one of which still stands in front of the hacienda. The Hacienda represents the history of three great periods in the Yucatán Peninsula: the pre-Columbian period (there are ruins nearby), the Spanish colonial period, and the boom years of henequen cultivation during the late 19th and early 20th century. Hacienda Yaxcopoil was purchased by Don Donaciano García Rejón and his wife Doña Mónica Galera in 1864, and has been owned by members of the same family since that time.

Hacienda Yaxcopoil was once considered one of the most important rural estates in the Yucatán. The entire property at when it was at its largest covered 22,000 acres (89 km^{2}). It operated first as a cattle ranch and later as a henequen plantation. Over time, due to continuous political, social and economic changes, the estate has been reduced to less than 3% of its original size.

Inside the hacienda, besides many original pieces of furniture, are two oil paintings showing Don Donaciano García Rejón and his wife Doña Mónica Galera. The office contains books, maps, documents, and other collections that form part of the archives of Yaxcopoil. These archives have been preserved faithfully and are available to valid researchers.

The patron saint of the hacienda is San Gerónimo de Yaxcopoil, who is still venerated in the pueblo near the hacienda. In the orchard, the water tanks and original US-made pump still supply water for hacienda, which now operates as a museum and guest house.

In the back of the museum is the "Maya Room." There are numerous pieces of ancient pottery and other archaeological relics of the "classic period" (A.D. 250-900) found in the nearby Mayan ruins of Yaxcopoil. There are numerous unexcavated pyramids with heights that vary from six to twenty meters, a court for ceremonial ball games, and stelae, which are scattered in an area of about eight square kilometers.

Hacienda Yaxcopoil also a well-preserved machine house, or casa de maquina, where the henequen shredding machines (planta desfibradora) were used to render fibers from the henequen plant. The engine room has been maintained in good condition with a 100 hp (75 kW) German diesel motor made by Körting (Hannover) in 1913. The engine was used until 1984, when the production of henequen fiber in the hacienda ended, after more than a century in operation.

Hacienda Yaxcopoil has been preserved but not renovated, and now operates as a museum, as well as a location for photo and film shoots. There is also a guest house on the property that can be rented for overnight stay.

== Chicxulub Crater Research ==
Yaxcopoil was the site of the borehole Yaxcopoil-1, drilled in 2001 and 2002 by the Chicxulub Scientific Drilling Project (CSDP). A multinational research team drilled to a depth of 1511 meters to research the impact and implications of the meteor which struck the earth on the Yucatán Peninsula 66 million years ago and created the Chicxulub crater. The first project to deep-drill and core into one of the largest and well-preserved terrestrial impact structures was executed in the Chicxulub crater in Mexico using integrated coring sampling and in-situ measurements. The combined use of different techniques allows a three-dimensional insight and a better understanding of impact processes. The project cost $1.5 million USD and was led by UNAM, the University Nacional Autonoma de Mexico. The borehole has been used subsequently for testing of the Yucatán's freshwater aquifer.
