= Umán Municipality =

Municipality in the Mexican state of Yucatán

Umán
- Municipality
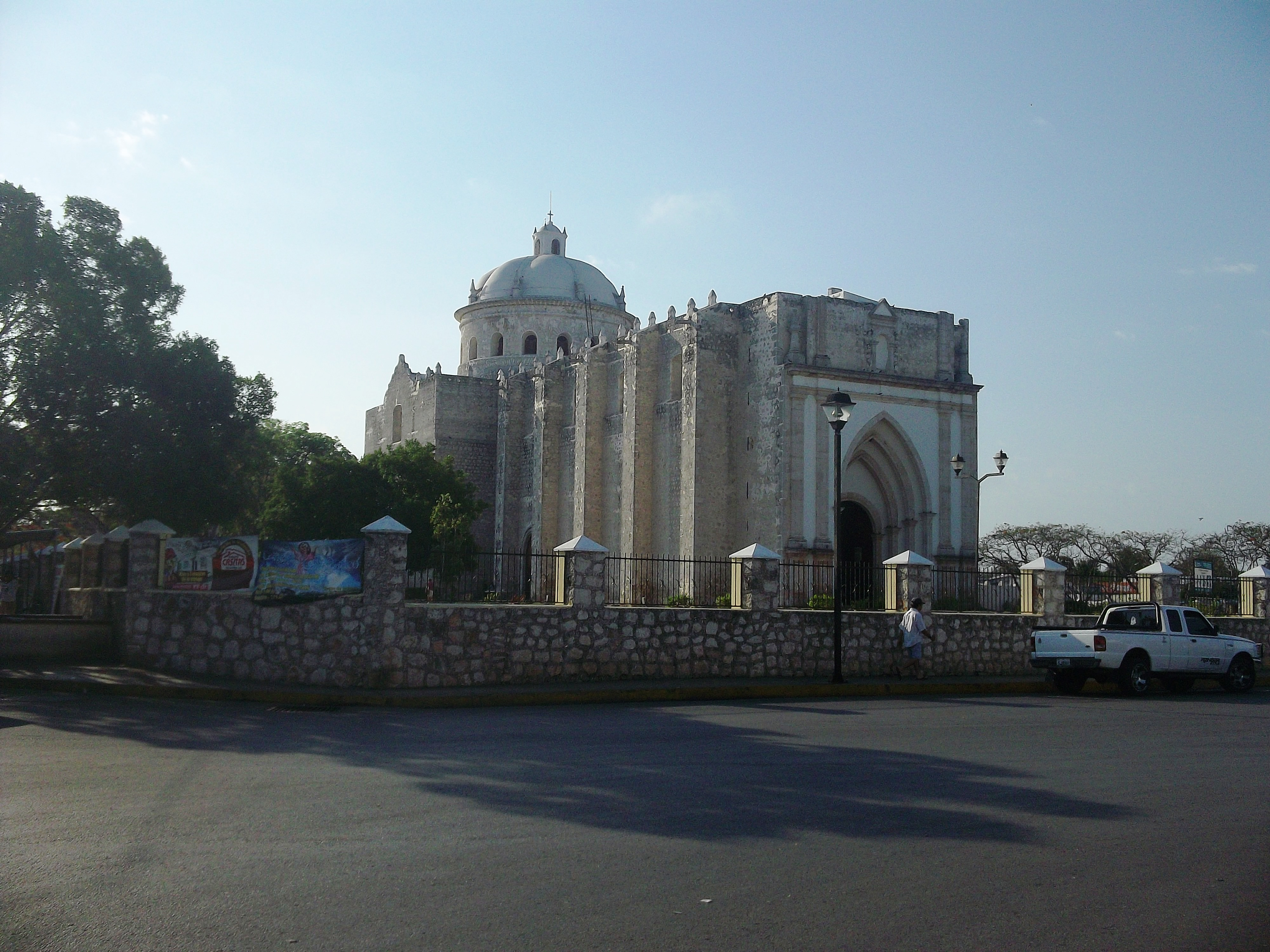
- Principal Church of Umán, Yucatán

- Coat of arms

- Region 2 Noroeste #101

- Location of the Municipality in Mexico
- Coordinates: 20°53′N 89°45′W
- Country: Mexico
- State: Yucatán
- Mexico Ind.: 1821
- Yucatán Est.: 1824
- Municipality Est: 1921

Government
  - Type: 2012–2015
  - Municipal President: Jesús Adrian Quintal Ic

Area
  - Total: 234.30 km^{2} (90.46 sq mi)
- Elevation: 7 m (23 ft)

Population (2010)
  - Total: 50,993
  - Density: 217.64/km^{2} (563.68/sq mi)
  - Demonym: Umanense
- Time zone: UTC-6 (Central Standard Time)
- Postal Code: 97390
- Area code: 988
- INEGI Code: 101
- Major Airport: Merida (Manuel Crescencio Rejón) International Airport
- IATA Code: MID
- ICAO Code: MMMD

Umán Municipality is a municipality in the Mexican state of Yucatán containing 234.30 km^{2} of land and located roughly 15 km southwest of the city of Mérida. The word "Umán" means “purchase” in the Yucatec Maya language.

== History ==
There is no accurate data on when the town was founded, though it existed before the conquest and in antiquity belonged to the chieftainship of Ah Canul. At colonization, Umán became part of the encomienda system with Francisco Hernández recorded as one of the earliest encomenderos.

Yucatán declared its independence from the Spanish Crown in 1821 and in 1825, the area was assigned to the Lower Camino Real with its headquarters in Hunucma Municipality. In 1921, was designated as its own municipality.

== Governance ==
The municipal president is elected for a three-year term. The town council has nine councilpersons, who serve as Secretary and councilors of heritage and sports, policing, education and health, public works, potable water, rural development and social management, roads and markets, nomenclature and recruiting, ecology, public monuments.

== Communities ==
The head of the municipality is Umán, Yucatán. There are 87 populated areas of the municipality. The most notable include Bolón, Dzibikak, Dzununcán, Itzincab, Oxcum, Oxholón, Poxilá, San Antonio Mulix, Tebec, Xtepen, and Yaxcopoil. The significant populations are shown below:

| Community | Population |
|---|---|
| Entire Municipality (2010) | 50,993 |
| Bolón | 1271 in 2005 |
| Dzibikak | 1238 in 2005 |
| Itzincab | 4744 in 2005 |
| Oxcum | 1049 in 2005 |
| Oxholón | 797 in 2005 |
| Poxilá | 801 in 2005 |
| Tebec | 459 in 2005 |
| Umán | 29135 in 2005 |
| Xtepén | 485 in 2005 |
| Yaxcopoil | 1102 in 2005 |

== Local festivals ==
Every year from 13 to 15 September the town holds a celebration for the Christ of Love.

== Tourist attractions ==
- The ex-convent and Church of St. Francis of Assisi, built in the eighteenth century
- Archaeological sites at Bolon, Hotzus and Kizil
- Hacienda Xtepén
- Hacienda Yaxcopoil

== Transportation ==
Umán is served by the Tren Maya at Umán railway station.
