= Angélica Araujo Lara =

Mexican politician and architect

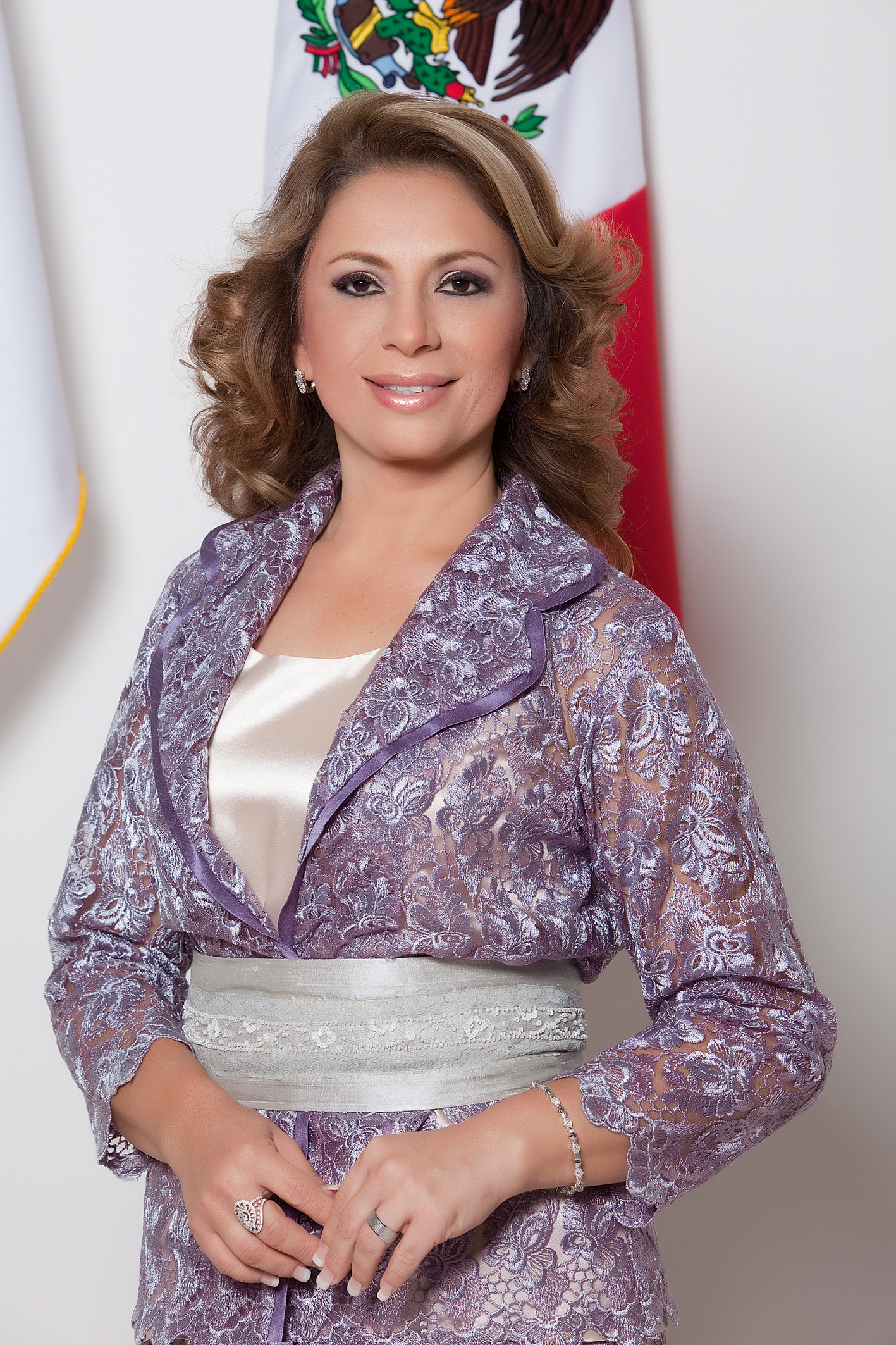

Senator for Yucatán
- In office 1 September 2012 – 31 August 2018 Serving with D. Ávila and R. Díaz
- Preceded by: Cleominio Zoreda Novelo
- Succeeded by: Raúl Paz Alonzo

32nd Mayor of Mérida
- In office July 1, 2010 – January 17, 2012
- Preceded by: César Bojórquez Zapata
- Succeeded by: Álvaro Omar Lara Pacheco

Member of the Chamber of Deputies
- In office September 1, 2009 – January 6, 2010
- Preceded by: Sofía Castro Romero
- Succeeded by: Efraín Aguilar Góngora

Personal details
- Born: June 21, 1964 (age 62) Tixkokob, Yucatán
- Party: Institutional Revolutionary Party
- Education: Universidad Autónoma de Yucatán
- Occupation: Architect; Politician
- Website: Official website

Angélica del Rosario Araujo Lara (Spanish pronunciation: [aŋˈxelika ðel roˈsaɾjo aˈɾawxo ˈlaɾa], born June 21, 1964) is a Mexican architect and politician, who served as the Senator for Yucatán. Previously, she was the municipal president of Mérida, Yucatán. She is a member of the Institutional Revolutionary Party.

== Early life and career ==
Angélica Araujo was born on July 21, 1964, in Tixkokob, Yucatán, the daughter of Humberto Araujo Hernández and María del Rosario Lara Báez.

Araujo studied architecture at the Universidad Autónoma de Yucatán. She began her professional activities in the Comisión Ordenadora del Uso del Suelo del Estado de Yucatán (English: Commission of order of the use of land of the State of Yucatán) and then started her own architectural practice.

== Political career ==
In 2007, the governor of Yucatán, Ivonne Ortega appointed Araujo as managing director of the Instituto de Vivienda del Estado de Yucatán (English: Housing Institute of the State of Yucatán), position she held until 2009, when she resigned to be nominated candidate to federal deputy by Third Federal Electoral District of Yucatán, in which she was elected to the period 2009 - 2012 in the LXI Legislature of the Congress of the Union.

On December 16, 2010, Yucatán's PRI announced her nomination as candidate of unity for the Municipal president of Mérida, Yucatán; thus, on January 6, 2010, she asked and obtained a leave as member of the Chamber of Deputies. On May 21, 2010, Araujo received the document that appointed her as winner in the elections; she took office on July 1. She became the first female member of the Institutional Revolutionary Party to rule the city. With her election, she ended 19 years of government of National Action Party in Mérida.

In September 2010, Araujo and the governor Ivonne Ortega, led "Tócate", a campaign against breast cancer.

On January 19, 2012, after 18 months as mayor of Mérida, Araujo left office to register as candidate for a seat in the Senate of the Republic in the following federal election on July 1, 2012. She won election and served as a Senator until her defeat in the 2018 elections.
