= María Castro =

María Castro may refer to:

- María Castro (swimmer) (born 1953), Salvadoran swimmer
- María Castro (actress) (born 1981), Spanish actress
- Maria G. Castro, professor of neurosurgery, and of biology
- María Elisa Castro, Argentine architect and politician
- Maria Emilia Reis Castro, Portuguese trade union activist
- María Fernanda Castro Maya, Mexican disability activist
- María Sofía Castro Romero, Mexican politician
