= Sabido =

Sabido is a surname. Notable people with the surname include:

- Andrés Sabido (born 1957), Spanish footballer
- Dolores Rodríguez Sabido (born 1958), Mexican politician
- Hugo Sabido (born 1979), Portuguese cyclist
- Irene Sabido, Mexican producer and writer
- Luis Pérez Sabido (born 1940), Mexican poet, composer, theatrical author and cultural promoter
- Miguel Sabido (born 1937), Mexican producer, writer, researcher and theorist
- Pedro Sabido (1894–1980), Filipino politician
