= Tooh =

Tooh may refer to:

- "Tooh" (song), composed by Vishal–Shekhar, 2013
- Toóh, a community of Mocochá Municipality, Yucatán, Mexico
- Trip out of hole (TOOH), an abbreviation in oil and gas exploration and production
- !T.O.O.H.! a Czech Death Metal band whose name is an acronym of The Obliteration Of Humanity.
