= Pablo Gamboa Miner =

Mexican politician (born 1986)

Member of the Chamber of Deputies
- In office 1 September 2021 – 31 August 2024
- Constituency: 3rd region
- In office 1 September 2015 – 1 March 2018
- Preceded by: Mauricio Sahuí Rivero
- Succeeded by: Omar Corzo Olán
- Constituency: Yucatán's 3rd

Personal details
- Born: 5 April 1986 (age 40)
- Party: Institutional Revolutionary Party (until 2024)
- Parent: Emilio Gamboa Patrón (father)

Pablo Gamboa Miner (born 5 April 1986) is a Mexican politician. Previously affiliated with the Institutional Revolutionary Party (PRI), he resigned his membership in May 2024.

Representing the PRI, he was a member of the Chamber of Deputies from 2015 to 2018, for Yucatán's 3rd district, and from 2021 to 2024, as a plurinominal deputy.

He is the son of Emilio Gamboa Patrón.
