= Roger Salazar =

Roger Salazar may refer to:

- Roger Salazar (consultant), media and crisis communications consultant
- Roger Aguilar Salazar, Mexican teacher and politician
- Roger Salazar (golfer), winner of the South Texas Open
- Roger Salazar, coach of the Arizona Sahuaros
