= Miguel Ángel Gutiérrez Machado =

Mexican politician (1960–2020)

- Born: 26 March 1960; Mérida, Yucatán, Mexico
- Died: 29 December 2020 (aged 60); Mérida, Yucatán, Mexico
- Occupation: Politician
- Political party: PAN

Miguel Ángel Gutiérrez Machado (26 March 1960 – 29 December 2020) was a Mexican politician from the National Action Party.

== Biography ==
From 2000 to 2003, during the 58th session of Congress, he served in the Chamber of Deputies representing the fourth electoral district of Yucatán.

He died at age 60 from COVID-19, during the COVID-19 pandemic in Mexico.
