= Eric Rubio Barthell =

Mexican politician

- Born: 30 June 1950 (age 75); Mexico City, Mexico
- Occupation: Politician
- Political party: PRI

Eric Luis Rubio Barthell (born 30 June 1950) is a Mexican politician affiliated with the Institutional Revolutionary Party (PRI).

In the 1988 general election he was elected to the Chamber of Deputies for the fourth district of Yucatán, and in the 1994 general election he returned to the Chamber of Deputies to represent Yucatán's third district.

In the 2000 general election he was elected to the Senate for the state of Yucatán for the 2000–2006 term.
