= 6th federal electoral district of Yucatán =

Federal electoral district of Mexico

Yucatán's 6th
- Electoral district of the Chamber of Deputies of Mexico

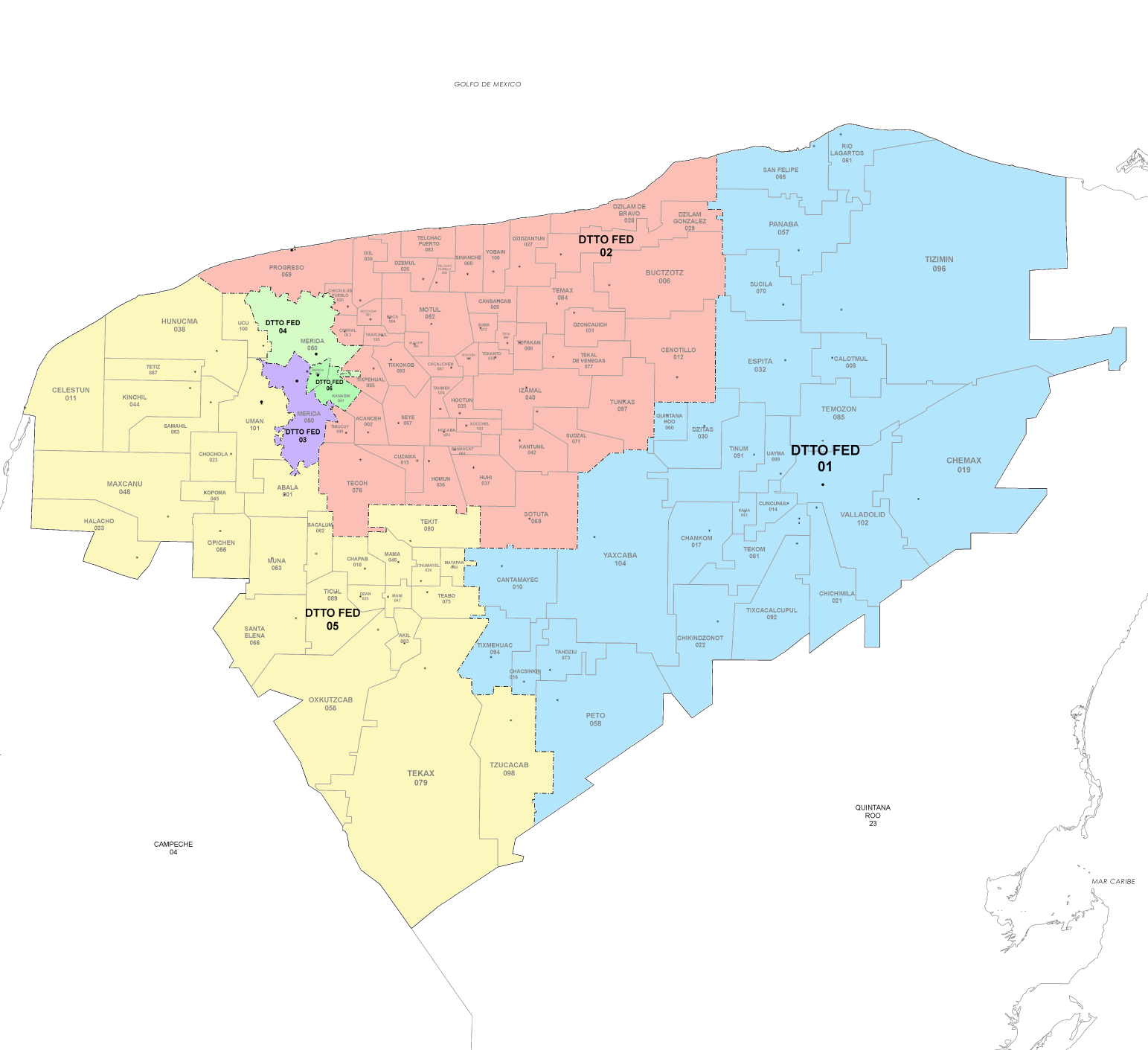
- 6th district since 2023

Incumbent
- Member: Jessica Saiden Quiroz
- Party: ▌Morena
- Congress: 66th (2024–2027)

District
- State: Yucatán
- Head town: Mérida
- Coordinates: 20°58′N 89°37′W
- Covers: Mérida (part) and Kanasín
- PR region: Third
- Precincts: 145
- Population: 373,556 (2020 census)
- Indigenous: Yes (47%)

The 6th federal electoral district of Yucatán (Spanish: Distrito electoral federal 06 de Yucatán) is one of the 300 electoral districts into which Mexico is divided for elections to the federal Chamber of Deputies and one of six such districts in the state of Yucatán.

It elects one deputy to the lower house of Congress for each three-year legislative period by means of the first-past-the-post system. Votes cast in the district also count towards the calculation of proportional representation ("plurinominal") deputies elected from the third region.

Created by the National Electoral Institute (INE) as part of the 2023 redistricting process, it was first contested in the 2024 general election. The inaugural member for the district, elected in June 2024, is Jessica Saiden Quiroz of the National Regeneration Movement (Morena).

== District territory ==
Evolution of electoral district numbers
	1974	1978	1996	2005	2017	2023
Yucatán	3	4	5	5	5	6
Chamber of Deputies	196	300				

The 6th district was created as part of the National Electoral Institute's 2023 redistricting process to reflect shifting population dynamics across the country. Under the new districting plan, which is to be used for the 2024, 2027 and 2030 federal elections, the 6th district comprises 145 electoral precincts (secciones electorales) in the urban core of the municipality of Mérida and the whole of the neighbouring municipality of Kanasín. (Note: The 3rd and 4th districts cover the remainder of the municipality of Mérida.)

The head town (cabecera distrital), where results from individual polling stations are gathered together and tallied, is the state capital, the city of Mérida. The district had a population of 373,556 in the 2020 census and, with Indigenous and Afrodescendent inhabitants accounting for over 47% of that number, Yucatán's sixth – like all the state's electoral districts, both local and federal – is classified by the INE as an indigenous district. (Note: Population figure indicates total inhabitants, not voters. The INE deems any local or federal electoral district where Indigenous or Afrodescendent inhabitants number 40% or more of the population to be an indigenous district.)

== Deputies returned to Congress ==
(Mexico) National parties
- Current
- PAN
- PRI
- PT
- PVEM
- MC
- Morena
- PAZ
- Somos
- Defunct or local only
- PLM
- PNR
- PRM
- PNM
- PP
- PPS
- PARM
- PFCRN
- CON
- PANAL
- PSD
- PES
- PES
- PRD

Yucatán's 6th district
Election	Deputy	Party	Term	Legislature
2024	Jessica Saiden Quiroz	National Regeneration Movement	2024–2027	66th Congress

== Presidential elections ==
Yucatán's 6th district
Election	District won by	Party or coalition	%
2024	Claudia Sheinbaum Pardo	Sigamos Haciendo Historia	61.9017
