= Raúl Paz Alonzo =

Mexican politician

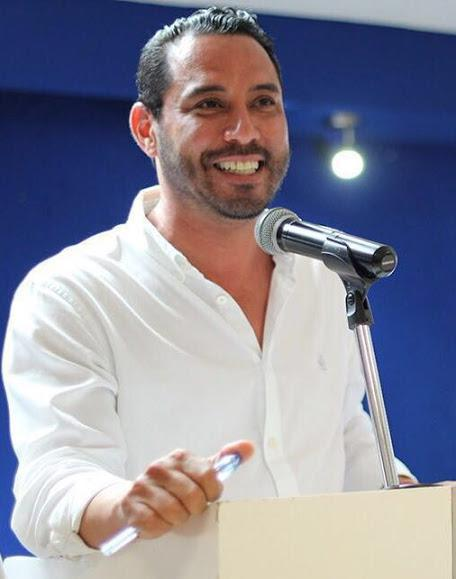

Senator for Yucatán
- Incumbent
- Assumed office 1 September 2018
- Preceded by: Angélica Araujo Lara

Personal details
- Born: 21 February 1976 (age 50) Mérida, Yucatán, Mexico
- Party: PAN; MORENA (2022–present)
- Education: ITESM
- Occupation: Politician

Raúl Paz Alonzo (born 21 February 1976) is a Mexican politician affiliated with the National Regeneration Movement (Morena), who previously belonged to the National Action Party (PAN).

In the 2012 general election, he was elected to the Chamber of Deputies to represent the fourth district of Yucatán for the PAN. In the 2018 general election, he was elected to the Senate for Yucatán on the PAN ticket. On 27 September 2022, he informed the Senate that he was switching his allegiance to Morena.
