= 3rd federal electoral district of Yucatán =

Federal electoral district of Mexico

Yucatán's 3rd
- Electoral district of the Chamber of Deputies of Mexico

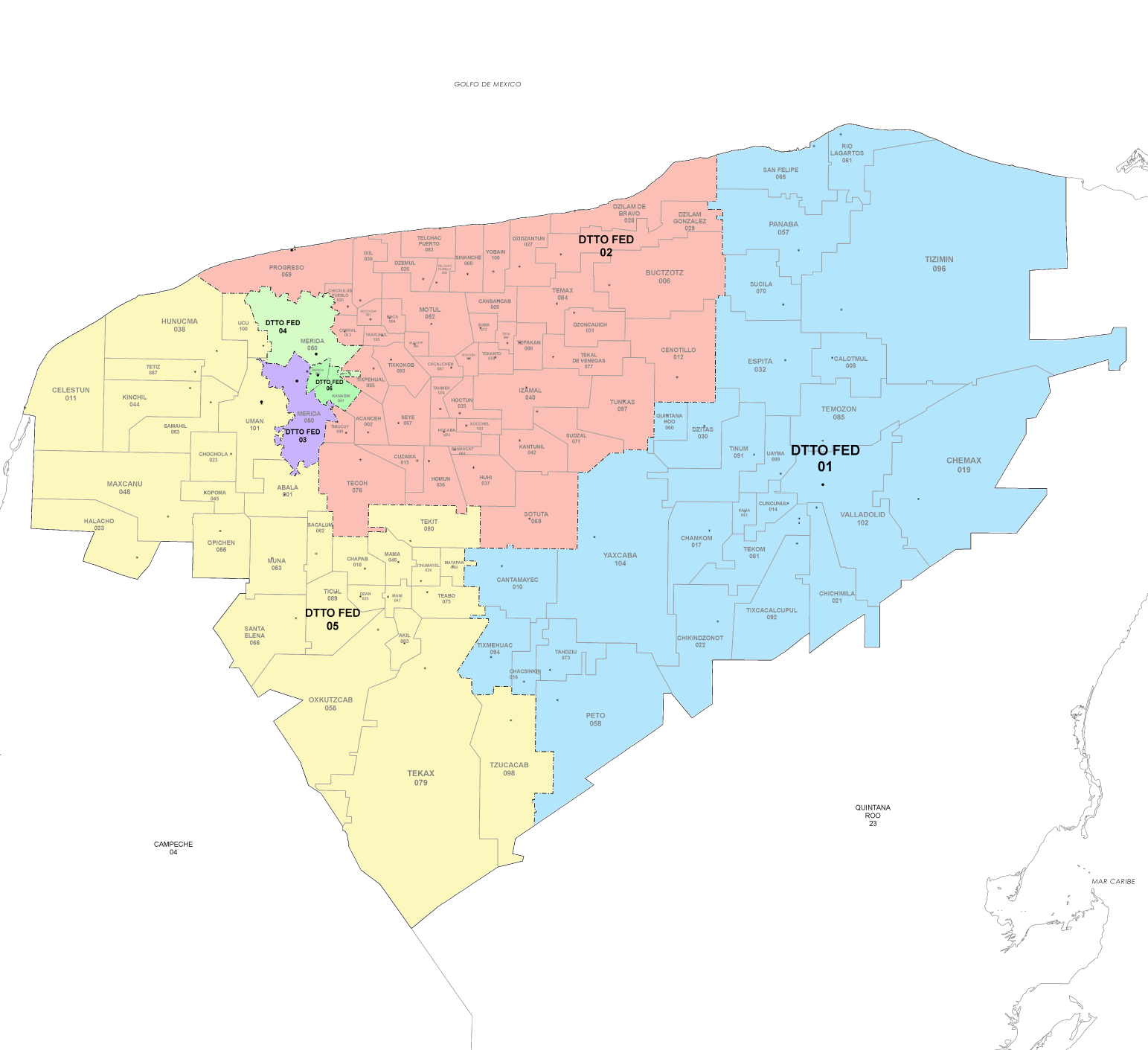
- 3rd district since 2023

Incumbent
- Member: Óscar Brito Zapata
- Party: ▌Morena
- Congress: 66th (2024–2027)

District
- State: Yucatán
- Head town: Mérida
- Coordinates: 20°58′N 89°37′W
- Covers: Municipality of Mérida (part)
- PR region: Third
- Precincts: 191
- Population: 372,609 (2020 census)
- Indigenous: Yes (43%)

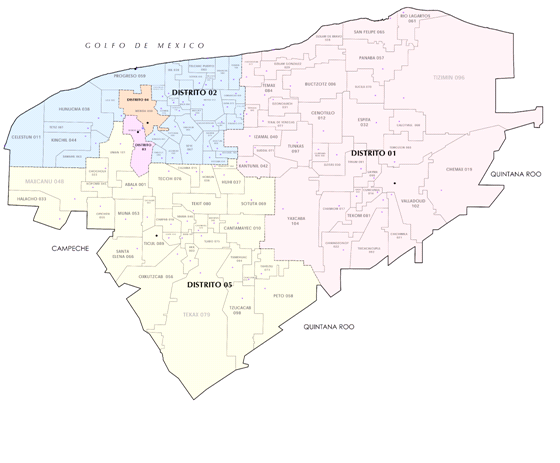
Yucatán under the 2017–2022 districting plan

3rd district in 2005–2017

The 3rd federal electoral district of Yucatán (Spanish: Distrito electoral federal 03 de Yucatán) is one of the 300 electoral districts into which Mexico is divided for elections to the federal Chamber of Deputies and one of six such districts in the state of Yucatán.

It elects one deputy to the lower house of Congress for each three-year legislative period by means of the first-past-the-post system. Votes cast in the district also count towards the calculation of proportional representation ("plurinominal") deputies elected from the third region.

The current member for the district, elected in the 2024 general election, is Óscar Iván Brito Zapata of the National Regeneration Movement (Morena).

== District territory ==
Yucatán gained a congressional seat in the 2023 redistricting process carried out by the National Electoral Institute (INE). Under the new districting plan, which is to be used for the 2024, 2027 and 2030 federal elections, the 3rd district comprises 191 electoral precincts (secciones electorales) in the south of the municipality of Mérida. (Note: The 4th and 6th districts cover the remainder of the municipality.)

The head town (cabecera distrital), where results from individual polling stations are gathered together and tallied, is the state capital, the city of Mérida. The district had a population of 372,609 in the 2020 census, and with Indigenous and Afrodescendent inhabitants accounting for over 43% of that total, Yucatán's 3rd – like all the state's electoral districts, both local and federal – is classified by the INE as an indigenous district. (Note: Population figure indicates total inhabitants, not voters. The INE deems any electoral district where Indigenous or Afrodescendent inhabitants number 40% or more of the population to be an indigenous district.)

== Previous districting schemes ==
Evolution of electoral district numbers
	1974	1978	1996	2005	2017	2023
Yucatán	3	4	5	5	5	6
Chamber of Deputies	196	300				

2017–2022

Between 1996 and 2022, Yucatán had five federal electoral districts. Under the 2017 scheme, the 3rd district's head town was at Mérida and it covered 240 precincts in the south of the municipality.

2005–2017

Under the 2005 districting scheme, the district covered 192 precincts in the north-western portion of the municipality of Mérida, with the city of Mérida as its head town.

1996–2005

Between 1996 and 2005, the district covered the western portion of the municipality of Mérida, with the city of Mérida as its head town.

1978–1996

The districting scheme in force from 1978 to 1996 was the result of the 1977 electoral reforms, which increased the number of single-member seats in the Chamber of Deputies from 196 to 300. Under that plan, Yucatán's district allocation rose from three to four. The 3rd district had its head town at Temax in the northern part of the state.

== Deputies returned to Congress ==
(Mexico) National parties
- Current
- PAN
- PRI
- PT
- PVEM
- MC
- Morena
- PAZ
- Somos
- Defunct or local only
- PLM
- PNR
- PRM
- PNM
- PP
- PPS
- PARM
- PFCRN
- CON
- PANAL
- PSD
- PES
- PES
- PRD

Yucatán's 3rd district
Election	Deputy	Party	Term	Legislature
1973	Efraín Ceballos Gutiérrez	Institutional Revolutionary Party	1979–1982	49th Congress
1976	Víctor Manzanilla Schaffer	Institutional Revolutionary Party	1982–1985	50th Congress
1979	Jorge Jure Cejín	Institutional Revolutionary Party	1979–1982	51st Congress
1982	Rubén Calderón Cecilio	Institutional Revolutionary Party	1982–1985	52nd Congress
1985	Wilbert Chi Góngora	Institutional Revolutionary Party	1985–1988	53rd Congress
1988	Noé Antonio Peniche Patrón	Institutional Revolutionary Party	1988–1991	54th Congress
1991	José Feliciano Moo y Can	Institutional Revolutionary Party	1991–1994	55th Congress
1994	Eric Rubio Barthell	Institutional Revolutionary Party	1994–1997	56th Congress
1997	Fernando Castellanos Pacheco	National Action Party (Mexico)	1997–2000	57th Congress
2000	Silvia López Escoffie	National Action Party (Mexico)	2000–2003	58th Congress
2003	José Orlando Pérez Moguel	National Action Party (Mexico)	2003–2006	59th Congress
2006	Sofía Castro Romero	National Action Party (Mexico)	2006–2009	60th Congress
2009	Angélica Araujo Lara (Note: Araujo Lara resigned her seat on 6 January 2010 to contend (successfully) for the municipal presidency of Mérida.); Efraín Aguilar Góngora	Institutional Revolutionary Party	2009–2010; 2010–2012	61st Congress
2012	Mauricio Sahuí Rivero	Institutional Revolutionary Party	2012–2015	62nd Congress
2015	Pablo Gamboa Miner; Omar Corzo Olán	Institutional Revolutionary Party	2015–2018; 2018	63rd Congress
2018	Roger Aguilar Salazar (Note: Aguilar Salazar was elected for the seat but died on 5 September 2018 before he could be sworn in. Interián Gallegos, his substitute, served the 2018–21 term in his stead.); Limbert Interián Gallegos	National Regeneration Movement	— 2018–2021	64th Congress
2021	Rommel Pacheco Marrufo	National Action Party (Mexico)	2021–2024	65th Congress
2024	Óscar Iván Brito Zapata	National Regeneration Movement	2024–2027	66th Congress

== Presidential elections ==
Yucatán's 3rd district
Election	District won by	Party or coalition	%
2018	Andrés Manuel López Obrador	Juntos Haremos Historia	46.8221
2024	Claudia Sheinbaum Pardo	Sigamos Haciendo Historia	60.4166
