= Dolores Rodríguez Sabido =

Mexican politician

- Born: 4 April 1958 (age 68); Mérida, Yucatán, Mexico
- Occupation: Politician
- Political party: PAN

Dolores del Socorro Rodríguez Sabido (born 4 April 1958) is a Mexican politician from the National Action Party (PAN). In 2009, during the 60th session of Congress, she sat in the Chamber of Deputies representing the fourth district of Yucatán as the substitute of Martín Ramírez Pech, who resigned his seat on 26 March 2009.
