= Efraín Aguilar Góngora =

Mexican politician

- Born: 7 November 1964 (age 61); Homún, Yucatán, Mexico
- Occupation: Politician
- Political party: PRI

Efraín Ernesto Aguilar Góngora (born 7 November 1964) is a Mexican politician from the Institutional Revolutionary Party (PRI). From 2010 to 2012 he sat in the Chamber of Deputies representing Yucatán's third district as the substitute of Angélica Araujo Lara.
