= Orlando Pérez Moguel =

Mexican politician

- Born: 28 January 1965 (age 61); Yucatán, Mexico
- Education: ITM
- Occupation: Politician
- Political party: PAN

José Orlando Pérez Moguel (born 28 January 1965) is a Mexican politician affiliated with the National Action Party (PAN).

In 1998–2001 he served as a local deputy in the Congress of Yucatán and in the 2003 mid-terms he was elected to the Chamber of Deputies to represent the third district of Yucatán during the 59th Congress.
