= Silvia López Escoffie =

Mexican politician (born 1955)

- Born: 21 March 1955 (age 71); Mérida, Yucatán, Mexico
- Education: Universidad Mesoamericana de San Agustín
- Occupation: Politician
- Political party: PAN (1995–2007)

Silvia América López Escoffie (born 21 March 1955) is a Mexican politician formerly from the National Action Party (PAN). In the 2000 general election she was elected to the Chamber of Deputies on the PAN ticket to represent the third district of Yucatán during the 58th Congress.
