= Luis Pérez Sabido =

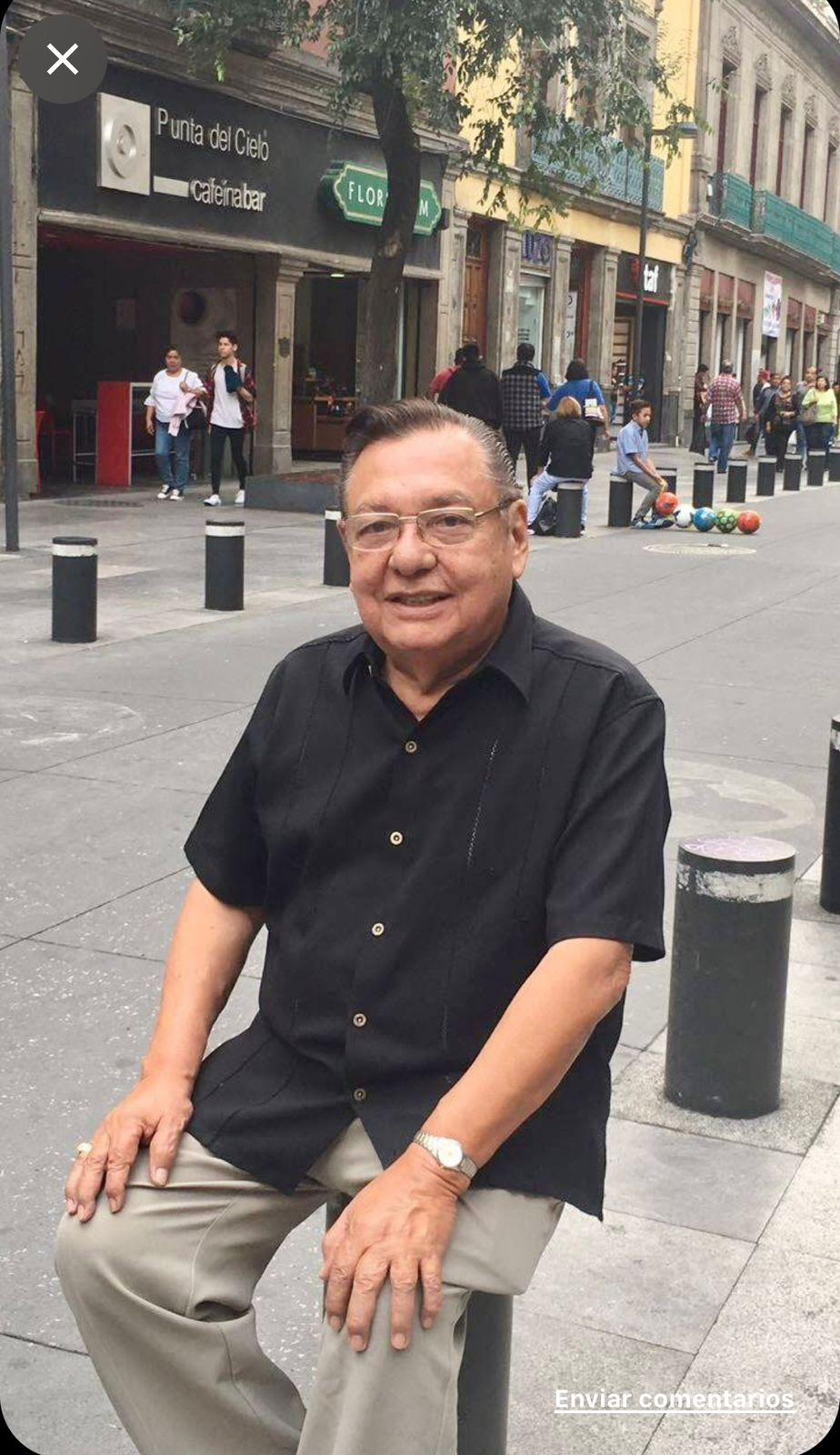
Luis Pérez Sabido

Luis Ángel Pérez Sabido (born January 7, 1940, Mocochá, Yucatán, Mexico) is a Mexican poet, composer, theatrical author, and cultural promoter. He is the author of the State of Yucatan´s (Mexico) anthem.

Two of his most well-known songs are "Yo sé que volverás" (1993) and "Todo termina" (2011). These songs were musicalized by the very famous yucatecan composer Armando Manzanero-Canché.

He was granted the Keys of the City of Miami In 1971, then in 1973 he was declared Honorary Citizen of New Orleans and in 2008 of Mérida in Venezuela.

Pérez-Sabido is considered the most prominent researcher on Yucatecan modern arts and culture.

On August 12, 2015, by agreement of the Municipality, the Cultural Center of his native town was named after him.
