= 4th federal electoral district of Yucatán =

Federal electoral district of Mexico

Yucatán's 4th
- Electoral district of the Chamber of Deputies of Mexico

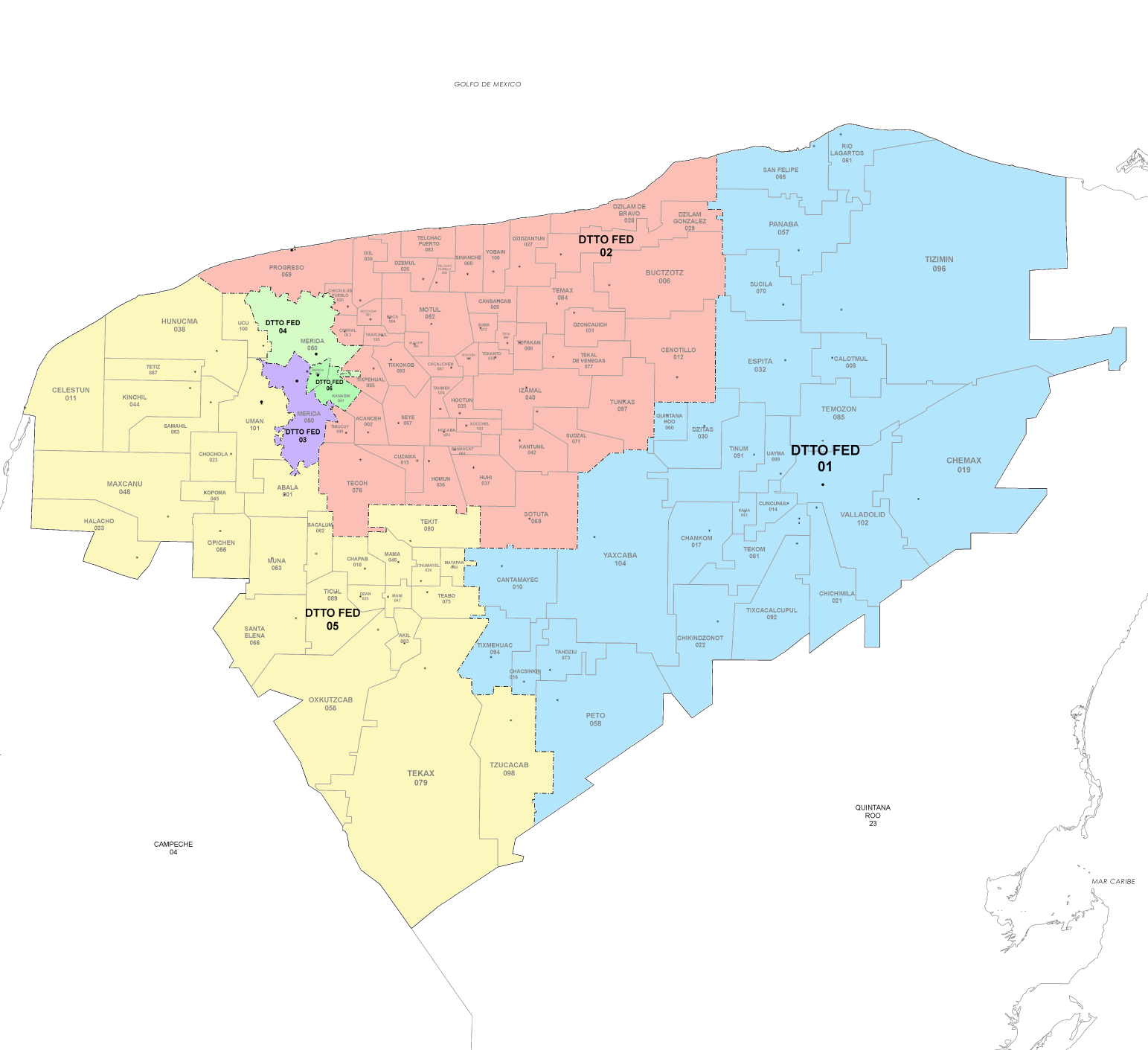
- 4th district since 2023

Incumbent
- Member: María Isabel Rodríguez Heredia
- Party: ▌National Action Party
- Congress: 66th (2024–2027)

District
- State: Yucatán
- Head town: Mérida
- Coordinates: 20°58′N 89°37′W
- Covers: Municipality of Mérida (part)
- PR region: Third
- Precincts: 137
- Population: 390,688 (2020 census)
- Indigenous: Yes (43%)

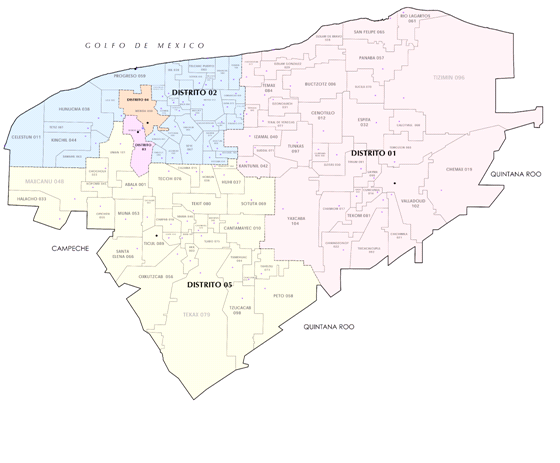
Yucatán under the 2017–2022 districting plan

4th district in 2005–2017

The 4th federal electoral district of Yucatán (Spanish: Distrito electoral federal 04 de Yucatán) is one of the 300 electoral districts into which Mexico is divided for elections to the federal Chamber of Deputies and one of six such districts in the state of Yucatán.

It elects one deputy to the lower house of Congress for each three-year legislative period by means of the first-past-the-post system. Votes cast in the district also count towards the calculation of proportional representation ("plurinominal") deputies elected from the third region.

Created as part of the 1977 electoral reforms, it was first contested in the 1979 mid-term election.

The current member for the district, elected in the 2024 general election, is María Isabel Rodríguez Heredia of the National Action Party (PAN).

== District territory ==
Yucatán gained a congressional seat in the 2023 redistricting process carried out by the National Electoral Institute (INE). Under the new districting plan, which is to be used for the 2024, 2027 and 2030 federal elections, the 4th district comprises 137 electoral precincts (secciones electorales) in the north of the municipality of Mérida. (Note: The third and sixth districts cover the remainder of the municipality.)

The head town (cabecera distrital), where results from individual polling stations are gathered together and tallied, is the state capital, the city of Mérida. The district had a population of 390,688 in the 2020 census and, with Indigenous and Afrodescendent inhabitants accounting for over 43% of that total, Yucatán's 4th – like all the state's electoral districts, both local and federal – is classified by the INE as an indigenous district. (Note: Population figure indicates total inhabitants, not voters. The INE deems any local or federal electoral district where Indigenous or Afrodescendent inhabitants number 40% or more of the population to be an indigenous district.)

== Previous districting schemes ==
Evolution of electoral district numbers
	1974	1978	1996	2005	2017	2023
Yucatán	3	4	5	5	5	6
Chamber of Deputies	196	300				

2017–2022

Between 1996 and 2022, Yucatán had five federal electoral districts. Under the 2017 scheme, the 4th district's head town was at Mérida and it covered 230 precincts in the north of the municipality.

2005–2017

Under the 2005 districting scheme, the district covered 211 precincts in the south and north-eastern portions of the municipality of Mérida, with the city of Mérida as its head town.

1996–2005

Between 1996 and 2005, the district covered the eastern portion of the municipality of Mérida, with the city of Mérida as its head town.

1978–1996

The districting scheme in force from 1978 to 1996 was the result of the 1977 electoral reforms, which increased the number of single-member seats in the Chamber of Deputies from 196 to 300. Under that plan, Yucatán's district allocation rose from three to four. The newly created 4th district had its head town at Mérida and it covered part of the city, the rural portion of the municipality of Mérida, and a series of neighbouring municipalities.

== Deputies returned to Congress ==
(Mexico) National parties
- Current
- PAN
- PRI
- PT
- PVEM
- MC
- Morena
- PAZ
- Somos
- Defunct or local only
- PLM
- PNR
- PRM
- PNM
- PP
- PPS
- PARM
- PFCRN
- CON
- PANAL
- PSD
- PES
- PES
- PRD

Yucatán's 4th district
Election	Deputy	Party	Term	Legislature
1979	Roger Milton Rubio Madera	Institutional Revolutionary Party	1979–1982	51st Congress
1982	Dulce María Sauri Riancho	Institutional Revolutionary Party	1982–1985	52nd Congress
1985	Renán Solís Avilés	Institutional Revolutionary Party	1985–1988	53rd Congress
1988	Eric Rubio Barthell	Institutional Revolutionary Party	1988–1991	54th Congress
1991	Ignacio Mendicuti Pavón	Institutional Revolutionary Party	1991–1994	55th Congress
1994	Tuffy Gaber Arjona	Institutional Revolutionary Party	1994–1997	56th Congress
1997	Edgar Martín Ramírez Pech	National Action Party (Mexico)	1997–2000	57th Congress
2000	Miguel Ángel Gutiérrez Machado	National Action Party (Mexico)	2000–2003	58th Congress
2003	Virginia Baeza Estrella	National Action Party (Mexico)	2003–2006	59th Congress
2006	Edgar Martín Ramírez Pech (Note: Ramírez Pech resigned his seat on 26 March 2009.); Dolores Rodríguez Sabido	National Action Party (Mexico)	2006–2009; 2009	60th Congress
2009	Rolando Zapata Bello (Note: Zapata Bello resigned his seat on 14 December 2011 to contend (successfully) for the governorship of Yucatán.); Daniel Jesús Granja Peniche	Institutional Revolutionary Party	2009–2011; 2011–2012	61st Congress
2012	Raúl Paz Alonzo	National Action Party (Mexico)	2012–2015	62nd Congress
2015	Francisco Alberto Torres Rivas	Ecologist Green Party of Mexico	2015–2018	63rd Congress
2018	Elías Lixa Abimerhi	National Action Party (Mexico)	2018–2021	64th Congress
2021	Cecilia Patrón Laviada	National Action Party (Mexico)	2021–2024	65th Congress
2024	María Isabel Rodríguez Heredia	National Action Party (Mexico)	2024–2027	66th Congress

== Presidential elections ==
Yucatán's 4th district
Election	District won by	Party or coalition	%
2018	Andrés Manuel López Obrador	Juntos Haremos Historia	39.9087
2024	Bertha Xóchitl Gálvez Ruiz	Fuerza y Corazón por México	51.4321
