= Virginia Baeza Estrella =

Mexican politician

- Born: 18 June 1965 (age 61); Mérida, Yucatán, Mexico
- Education: Mérida Institute of Technology
- Occupation: Politician
- Political party: PAN

Virginia Yleana Baeza Estrella (born 18 June 1965) is a Mexican politician affiliated with the National Action Party (PAN). In the 2003 mid-terms she was elected to the Chamber of Deputies to represent the fourth district of Yucatán during the 59th Congress.
