= Elías Lixa =

Mexican politician (born 1987)

Member of the Chamber of Deputies
- In office 1 September 2018 – 31 August 2021
- Preceded by: Panchito Torres Rivas
- Constituency: 4th federal electoral district of Yucatán (2018–2021)

Personal details
- Born: 28 February 1987 (age 39)
- Party: National Action Party

José Elías Lixa Abimerhi (born 28 February 1987) is a Mexican politician from the National Action Party (PAN).

He served as a member of the Chamber of Deputies from 2018 to 2021, representing Yucatán's 4th district. In the 2021 and 2024 federal elections, he was re-elected to Congress as a plurinominal deputy. From 2015 to 2018, he was a member of the Congress of Yucatán.
