= Tixkokob Municipality =

Municipality in the Mexican state of Yucatán

Tixkokob
- Municipality
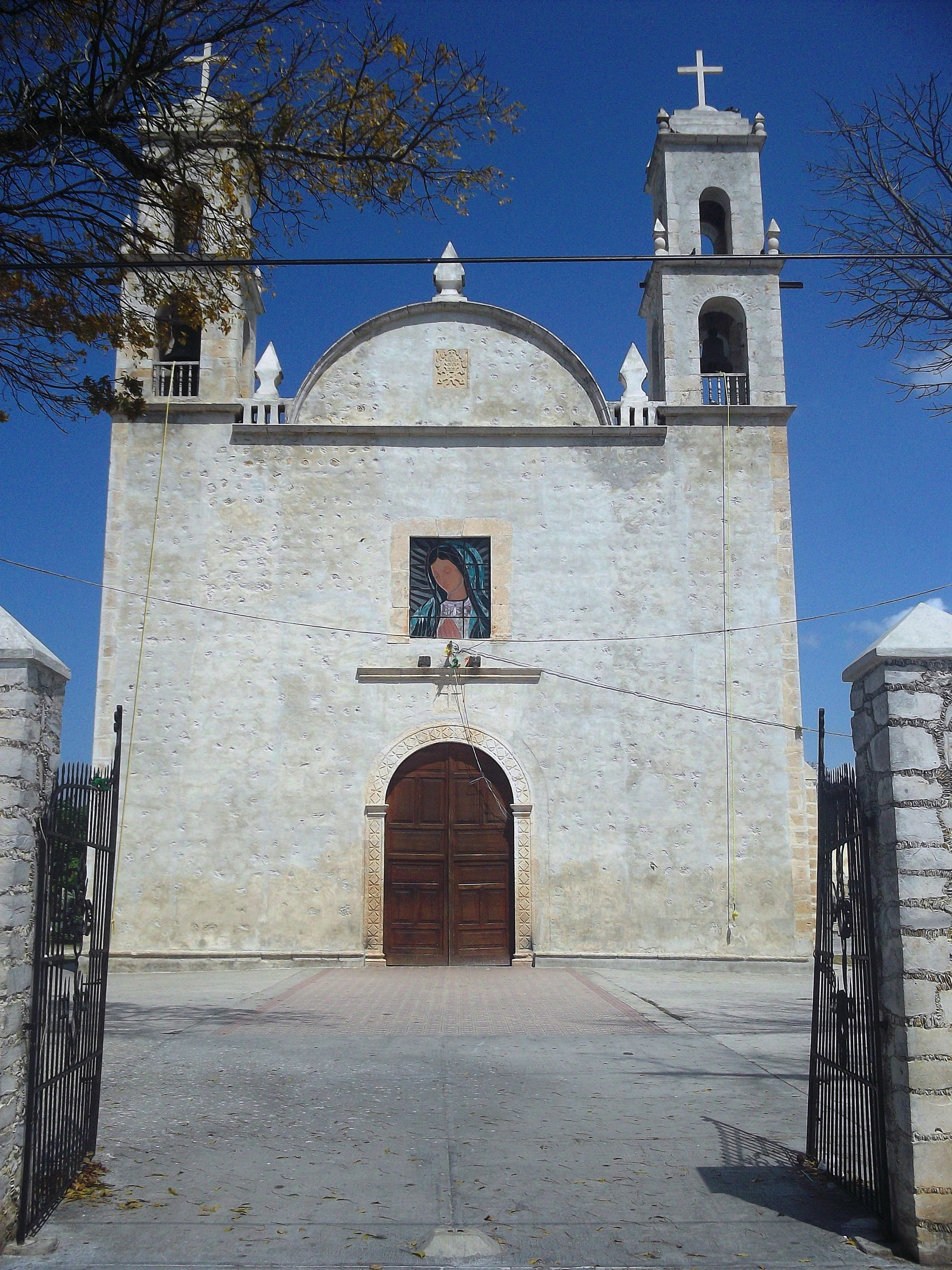
- Church of Tixkokob, Yucatán

- Region 2 Noroeste #093

- Location within Mexico
- Coordinates: 21°00′N 89°24′W
- Country: Mexico
- State: Yucatán
- Mexico Ind.: 1821
- Yucatán Est.: 1824
- Municipality Est.: 1923

Area
  - Total: 159.67 km^{2} (61.65 sq mi)
- Elevation: 8 m (26 ft)

Population (2005)
  - Total: 16,151
  - Demonym: Tixkokobenses
- Time zone: UTC-6 (Central Standard Time)
- Postal Code: 97470
- Area code: 991
- INEGI Code: 093
- Major Airport: Merida (Manuel Crescencio Rejón) International Airport
- IATA Code: MID
- ICAO Code: MMMD

Tixkokob Municipality (In the Yucatec Maya language: “Place of the poisonous snakes”) is a municipality in the Mexican state of Yucatán. Its municipal seat is located in the City of Tixkokob. The town of Tixkokob is famous within the area for high quality hammock weaving. The municipality made up largely of working class communities.

== Location ==
Tixkokob is located in the center of the Yucatán henequen zone, about 24 miles east of the city of Mérida, capital of the state. Tixkokob is about halfway along the road from Mérida to Izamal.

== History ==
In antiquity, it was part of the province of Ceh-Pech. Upon the conquest, it became part of the encomienda system. It is referenced in a document dated 1549, indicating 540 indigenous persons affiliated with the encomendero.

In 1821, Yucatán was declared independent of the Spanish Crown. In 1825 the area was part of the Coastal region, with its headquarters in Izamal. On 10 April 1843, 500 soldiers under the command of Lieutenant Colonel Francisco Pérez and General Peña y Barragán, defended the Mexican government against separatist Yucatecan forces in Tixkokob.

In July 1867, Tixkokob was designated as a Villa by the State Congress. In 1914, it was elevated to the rank of city, but a few months later demoted again. In 1923 the ejido system was put in place and Tixkokob became a free pueblo.

== Governance ==
The municipal president is elected for a term of three years. The president appoints nine Councilpersons to serve on the board for three year terms, as the Secretary and councilors of culture, public image, public works, sports, ecology, cemeteries, parks and gardens, and nomenclature.

== Communities ==
The municipality is made up of 17 different communities, of which the most important are:

Community	Population
Entire Municipality (2010)	17,176
Ruinas de Aké	382 in 2005
Ekmul	2009 in 2005
Euán	1047 in 2005
Nolo	1459 in 2005
San Antonio Millet	588 in 2005
Tixkokob	10338 in 2005

== Places of interest ==
- The archaeological zone of Ake is located in the municipality of Tixkokob, 15 kilometers from the township of Tixkokob.
- Cenote Yaax Ha
- Hacienda Ruinas de Ake
- Hacienda Hubila
- Hacienda Kankabchén
- Hacienda Kanyunyun
- Hacienda Katanchel
- Hacienda Nohchan
- Hacienda Oncan
- Hacienda San Antonio Millet
- Hacienda Santa María Chí

== Transportation ==
Tixkokob is served by Tixkokob railway station of the Tren Maya.

== Notables ==
Notable locals include the following:

Hernando Pech

Tixkokob chieftain who was accused of attending a Tehchamac human sacrifice, Tehchamac was located near the border of the province of Chepech Chacan.

Ah Kin Chablé

Tixkokob priest, who served as an informant to Adelantado Montejo. The Maya priest converted to Christianity and took the name of D. Lorenzo Chablé.

Arsenio Puerto Lara

A supporter of Carrillo Puerto and a member of the socialist league when she was young. Carrillo Puerto received the support of thousands of henequen workers. General Cardenas supported Lara to succeed General Canto Echeverria. In his tenure at the committee, Lara obtained significant benefits for the farmers of Tixkokob.

Carlos R. Menéndez

Writer, journalist and historian (1872–1961), founder of the Printing Company currently publishes the newspaper Diario de Yucatán.
