= Roger Aguilar Salazar =

Mexican politician

Roger Hervé Aguilar Salazar (September 12, 1938 – September 5, 2018) was a Mexican teacher, politician and 2018 Deputy-elect to the national Chamber of Deputies from the Third Federal Electoral District of Yucatán, based in Mérida. A member of the National Regeneration Movement (MORENA) party of President-elect Andrés Manuel López Obrador, Aguilar was elected to the Chamber of Deputies from Yucatán in the 2018 general election on July 1, 2018. However, just months later, Aguilar died from cerebral hemorrhage on September 5, 2018, before taking office. Aguilar was the first left-wing politician to gain a seat in Chamber of Deputies through a majority vote in Yucatán state history.

Salazar was born in Mérida on September 12, 1938. He attend the Escuela Normal de San Diego, a rural school in Tekax, Yucatán, and the Escuela Superior de la Metrópoli, where he studied mathematics. He worked as a teacher and taught math at the Yaxkabá primary school in Xocchel Municipality.

In 1969, he led protests against the government of Mexican President Gustavo Díaz Ordaz.

In 2018, Aguilar announced his candidacy for Chamber of Deputies for the Third Federal Electoral District of Yucatán as a member of the MORENA party of presidential candidate Andrés Manuel López Obrador. The general election was held on July 1, 2018. Aguilar's opponent, Cecilia Patrón Laviada of the National Action Party (PAN) was initially declared the winner of the seat. However, Aguilar appealed the results to the Federal Electoral Tribunal. A federal judge agreed to Aguilar's appeal and ordered a recount. After the recount, a judge ruled in favor of Aguilar and ruled him to be the winner of the seat.

Aguilar, however, would never be sworn in due to his deteriorating health. He died from a cerebral hemorrhage, a complication of multi-year illness with leukemia, at the Hospital Regional de Alta Especialidad de la Península de Yucatán in Mérida, Yucatán, at the age of 79. He was survived by his wife, Mirna Buenfil Valencia, and two children, Tania Violeta Nadia Alina and Fidel Efraín. Limbert Iván de Jesús Interian Gallegos, his elected alternate, took his seat in the Chamber of Deputies and was sworn in on September 13.
