= Daniel Ávila Ruiz =

Mexican politician

Daniel Gabriel Ávila
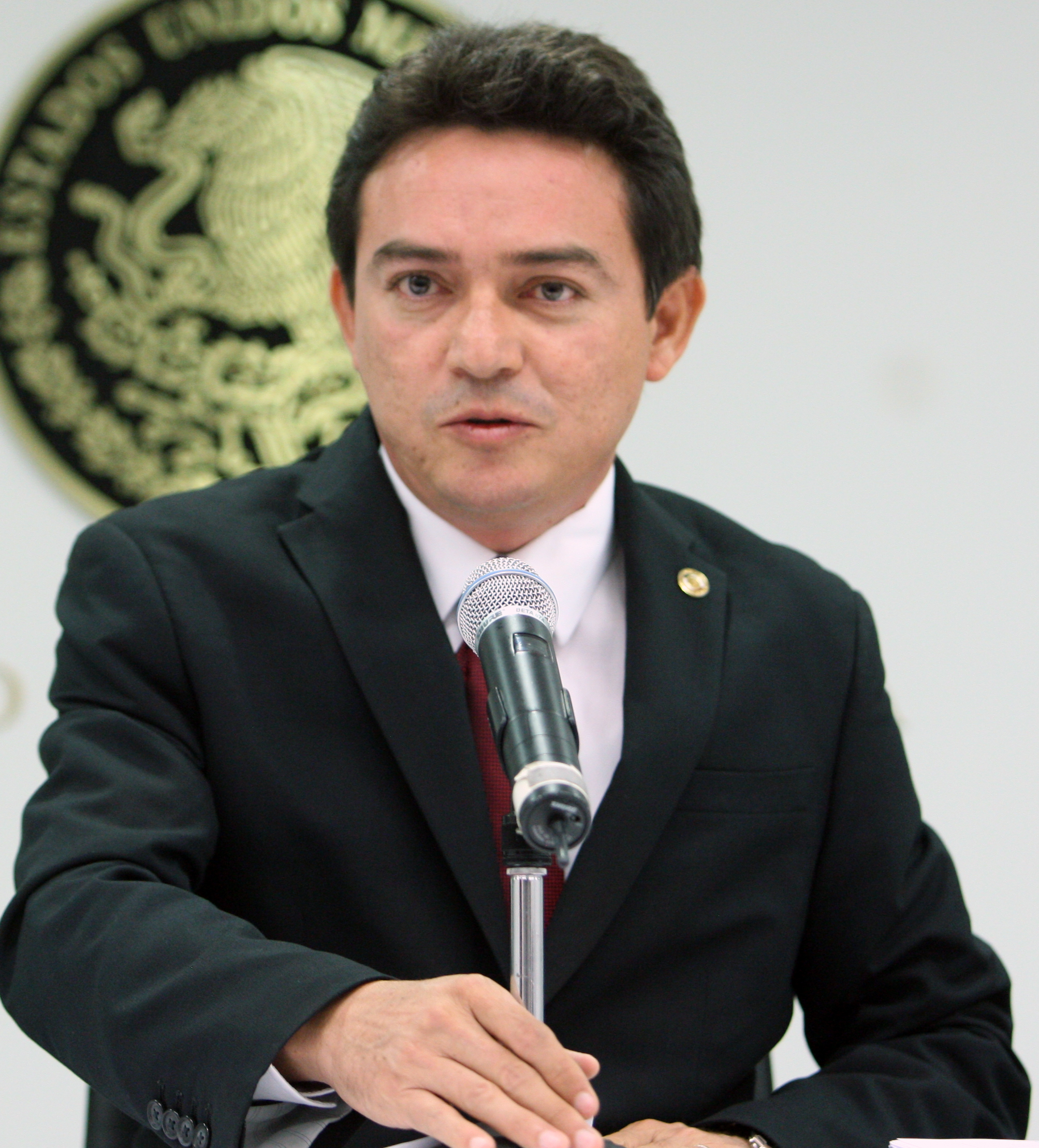
- Ávila in 2013
- Born: 3 August 1971 (age 54); Tizimín, Yucatán, Mexico
- Occupation: Senator
- Political party: PAN

Daniel Gabriel Ávila Ruiz (born 3 August 1971) is a Mexican politician affiliated with the PAN. He currently serves as Senator of the LXII Legislature of the Mexican Congress representing Yucatán. He also served as Deputy during the LXI Legislature.
