= Mauricio Sahuí Rivero =

Mexican politician

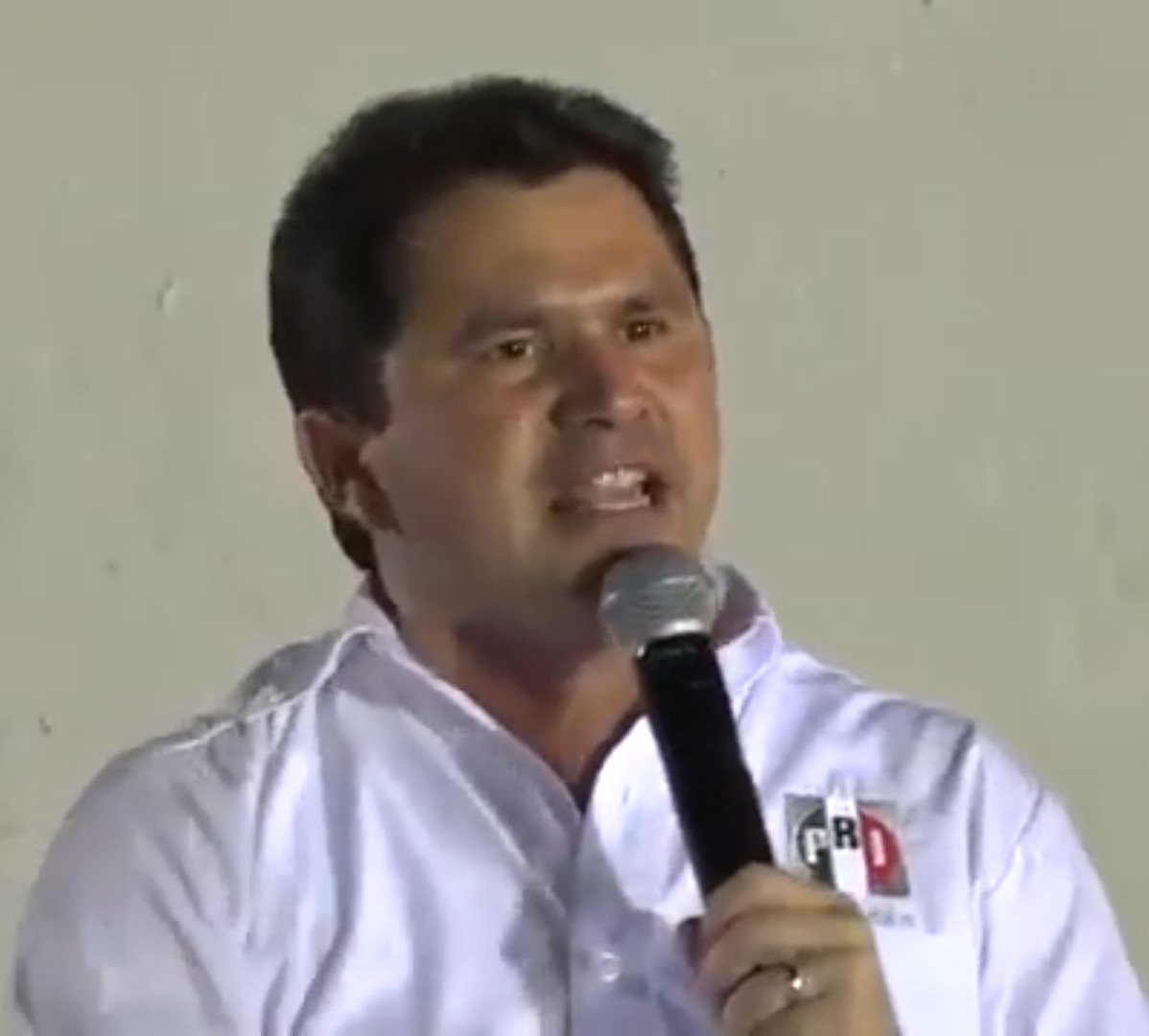
- Born: 8 February 1976 (age 50); Mérida, Yucatán, Mexico
- Education: UADY
- Occupation: Politician
- Political party: PRI
- Website: www.mauriciosahuirivero.com

Mauricio Sahuí Rivero (born 8 February 1976) is a Mexican politician affiliated with the Institutional Revolutionary Party (PRI).

In the 2012 general election he was elected to the Chamber of Deputies to represent the third district of Yucatán during the 62nd Congress. He had previously served in the Congress of Yucatán from 2010 to 2012.

Sahuí Rivero was the PRI coalition candidate in the 2018 Yucatán gubernatorial election, in which he finished second with 36 percent of the vote behind Mauricio Vila Dosal of the National Action Party.
