= Tixkokob =

Town in the Mexican state of Yucatán

- Town
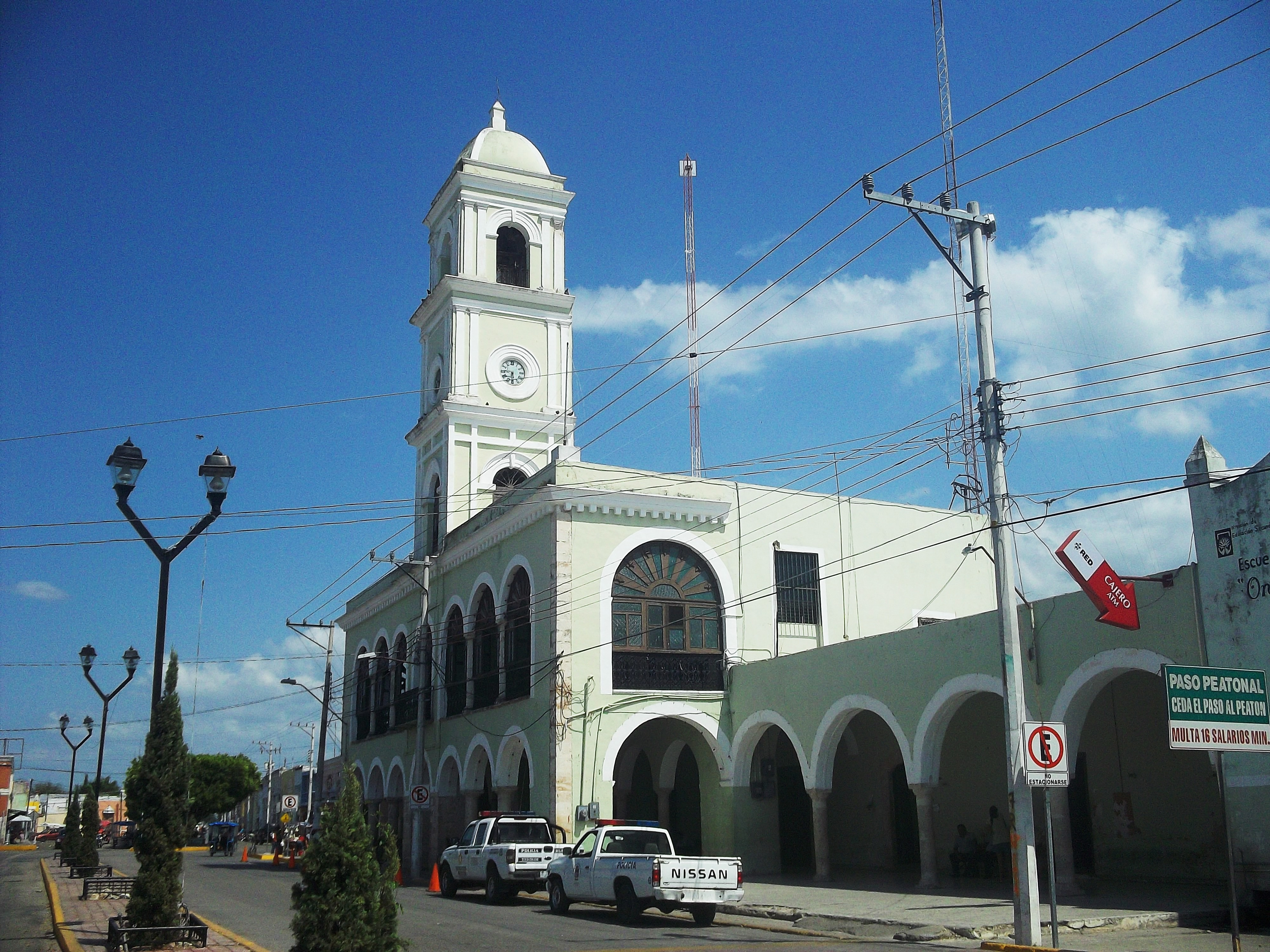

- Location in Yucatan Tixkokob (Mexico)
- Coordinates: 21°00′08″N 89°23′37″W
- Country: Mexico
- State: Yucatan
- Municipality: Tixkokob
- Elevation: 8 m (26 ft)

Population (2010)
  - Total: 10,968
- Time zone: UTC-6 (Central Standard Time)
- ZIP code: 97470
- Area code: 985
- INEGI Code: 310930001

Tixkokob (Spanish pronunciation: [tiʃ.koˈkoβ], meaning place of poisonous snakes in Mayan) is a town in the Mexican state of Yucatán, located in the north central part of the state. It is the seat of Tixkokob Municipality and is located about 24 miles east of the city of Mérida. As of 2005 it has a population of 10,338.

== History ==
Prior to the Spanish conquest of Yucatán, this area belonged to the chieftainship of Ceh-Pech. There is no record of the founding date of the population and its earliest reference is from the year 1549.

In 1867, by decree of the Congress of Yucatán it received the category of town. In 1914 it was given city status, but a few months after this decree was repealed and returned to the status of town. It has been the municipal seat since 1918.
