= Maria Emilia Reis Castro =

Portuguese trade union activist

Maria Emilia Reis Castro (born 1940) is a Portuguese trade union activist.

In 1969 she became active in Porto's Clothing Trade Union, joining its executive in 1974. In 1975 she helped to found Base-FUT, a self-managing socialist group influenced by Roman Catholicism. She has been a member of the national council and the executive commission of the Portuguese General Confederation of Labor.
