= María Fernanda Castro Maya =

Mexican disability activist

- Born: 1993 (age 32–33); Mexico City
- Occupations: Advocate, activist
- Awards: 100 Women (2022)

María Fernanda Castro Maya (Mexico City, 1993) is a Mexican self-advocate disability rights activist.

== Career ==
Due to her intellectual disability, she became part of the Confederación Mexicana de Organizaciones en Favor de la Persona con Discapacidad Intellectual, an organization that works to guarantee the rights of disable people, with the support of Human Rights Watch. For example, it requested all Mexican political parties to take in consideration intellectual disabilities and learning difficulties in the measures that they endorse.

Spanish: Las personas con discapacidad intelectual no somos niños eternos, porque podemos decidir, opinar e involucrarnos de temas en común y hacernos responsables. Queremos que nos consulten sobre las leyes que se hacen; eso nos permitirá ser parte de las decisiones del país. Us, intellectually disabled people, are not everlasting children, because we can decide, have an opinion and get involved in common topics and be responsible as well. We want to be consulted about the laws that are made: that will let us participate in the decisions of our country.

She advocates for linguistic accessibility regarding documents linked to political decisions, as well as for inclusion of disabled people in political parties and electoral acts.

She was part of the Mexican delegation that presented a report to the United Nations about disability rights, and since 2020 she is the regional representative of Empower Us, a group pertaining to the global network Inclusion International. Castro also organized the online consultation about political participation of people with intellectual or psychosocial disabilities, and moderated a panel discussion at the Inclusion International World Congress.

She even made a proposal to the 2022 Parliament of People with Disabilities to make an amendment in the Mexico City Civil Code in order to abolish the requirement that disabled adults still have a legal guardian. The proposal was sent to the Congreso de la Ciudad de México and still hasn't been answered.

In 2022, she was included in the BBC 100 Women list for upholding disability rights in Mexico and fighting for their political participation.
