= Mocochá Municipality =

Municipality in the Mexican state of Yucatán

Mocochá
- Municipality
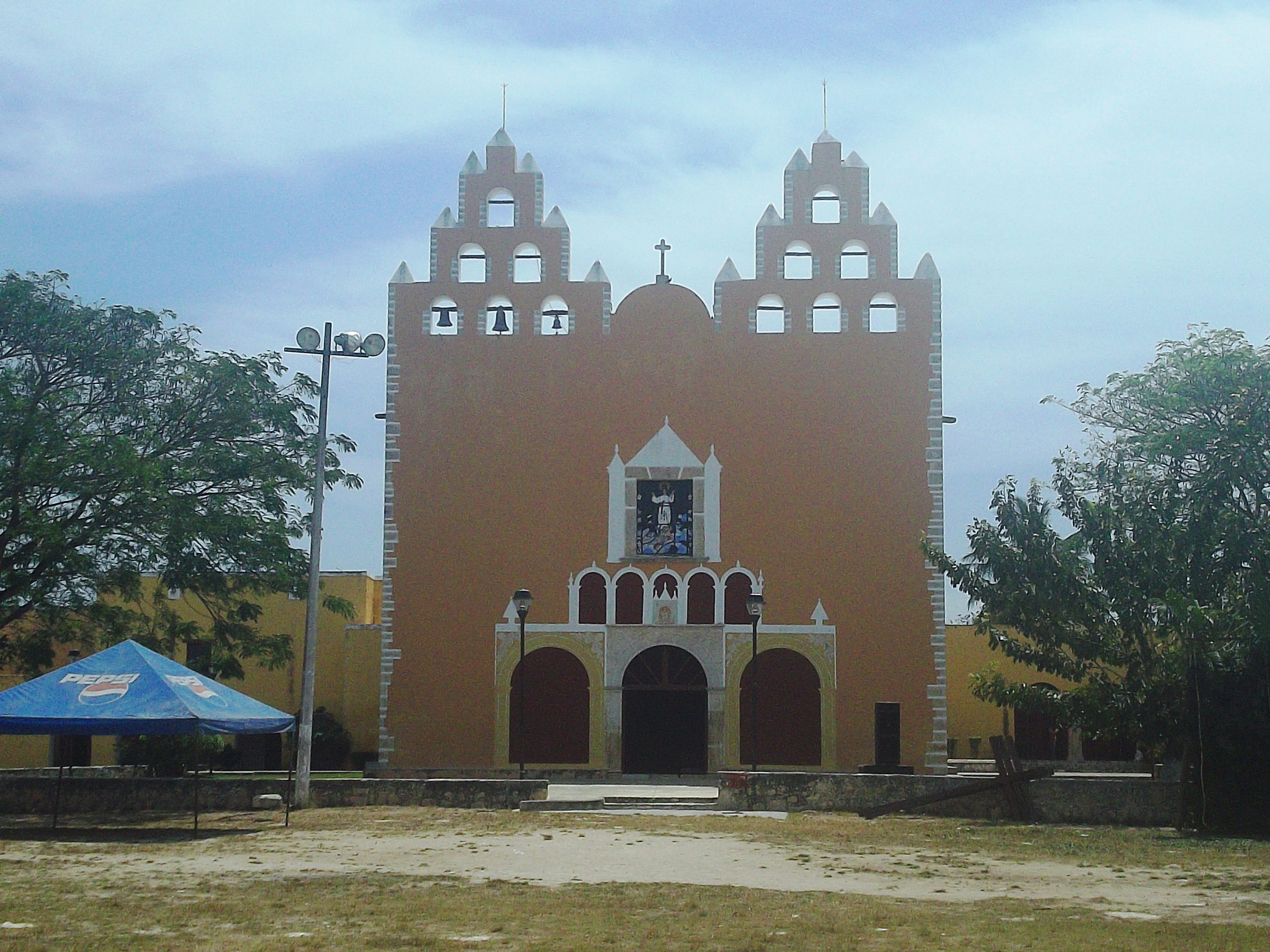
- Principal Church of Mocochá, Yucatán

- Region 2 Noroeste #051

- Location of the Municipality in Mexico
- Coordinates: 21°06′20″N 89°27′05″W
- Country: Mexico
- State: Yucatán

Government
  - Type: 2012–2015
  - Municipal President: Manuela De Jesus Cauich Ek

Area
  - Total: 57.48 km^{2} (22.19 sq mi)
- Elevation: 8 m (26 ft)

Population (2010)
  - Total: 3,071
- Time zone: UTC-6 (Central Standard Time)
- INEGI Code: 051
- Major Airport: Merida (Manuel Crescencio Rejón) International Airport
- IATA Code: MID
- ICAO Code: MMMD

Mocochá Municipality (Yucatec Maya language, 'reflection of the knot in the water') is a municipality in the Mexican state of Yucatán containing 57.48 square kilometres (22.19 sq mi) of land and located roughly 25 kilometres (16 mi) northeast of the city of Mérida.

== History ==
During pre-Hispanic times, the town fell within the provinces under the chieftainship of Ceh Pech. After the conquest the area became part of the encomienda system. In 1549 Francisco de Montejo the Younger was the encomendero and responsible for 1680 indigenous persons. In 1571 it had passed to Diego de Santillán.

Yucatán declared its independence from the Spanish Crown in 1821 and in 1825, the area was assigned to the Coastal region with its headquarters in Izamal. In the mid-nineteenth century, Mocochá was assigned to the Tixkokob Municipality and remained in that jurisdiction until 1918 when it was designated as its own municipality.

== Governance ==
The municipal president is elected for a three-year term. The town council has four councilpersons, who serve as Secretary and councilors of public security, ecology and public sanitation.

The Municipal Council administers the business of the municipality. It is responsible for budgeting and expenditures and producing all required reports for all branches of the municipal administration. Annually it determines educational standards for schools.

The Police Commissioners ensure public order and safety. They are tasked with enforcing regulations, distributing materials and administering rulings of general compliance issued by the council.

== Communities ==
The head of the municipality is Mocochá, Yucatán. The larger populated areas of the municipality include Carolina, Kinchén, Kumán, el Porvenir, San Ignacio, Santa Isabel, Tekat, Toóh, Xluch, and Xbená. The significant populations are shown below:

Community	Population
Entire Municipality (2010)	3,071
Mocochá	1955 in 2005
Tekat	532 in 2005
Toóh	399 in 2005

== Local festivals ==
Every year on 14 April is the celebration for the town's patroness, Immaculate Conception.

== Tourist attractions ==
- Convent and Church of the Immaculate Conception built in the seventeenth century
- Hacienda Mocochá
- Hacienda Tekat
- Hacienda Toó

Ascuncion Mococha is the shrine built in late 1600s which is dedicated to the Virgin of the Assumption. It is situated in a palm grove garden. Its entrance doors are dated to 1697. A small stone image of Virgin in a praying posture is embedded in the western door frame. There is a double storied camarin at the rear side of the altar where the image is located. The facade of the church is in a square geometrical design with a pair of three tiered espandans, which have simple openings with decoration of pyramid shaped merlons. The porch has decorative arcades with stucco ornamentation dated to 1700s. Three reablos of baroque design are located in the church. These are modern but crudely painted and of poor quality, as the originals could not be restored. The altar piece in the church has an image of the Virgin. There is an adjoining altar where image of St. Anne carrying the Virgin and the Child is deified.

== Bibliography ==
- Perry, Richard D.; Perry, Rosalind (2002). Maya Missions: Exploring Colonial Yucatan. Espada├▒a Press. ISBN 978-0-9620811-9-4.
