= Martín Ramírez Pech =

Mexican politician

- Born: 23 January 1968 (age 58); Mérida, Yucatán, Mexico
- Occupation: Politician
- Political party: PAN

Édgar Martín Ramírez Pech (born 23 January 1968) is a Mexican politician from the National Action Party (PAN). He was elected to the Chamber of Deputies to represent to represent the fourth district of Yucatán in both the 1997 and 2006 elections.
