= María Sofía Castro Romero =

Mexican politician

- Born: 12 October 1951 (age 74); Yucatán, Mexico
- Occupation: Politician
- Political party: PAN

María del Perpetuo Socorro Sofía Castro Romero (born 12 October 1951) is a Mexican politician from the National Action Party (PAN). In the 2006 general election she was elected to the Chamber of Deputies to represent the third district of Yucatán during the 60th Congress.
