= Teya =

Teya may refer to:

- Teya, Burma, in Taungtha Township of Myingyan District in Mandalay Region of Burma
- Teya people, an extinct Native American tribe from Texas
- Teya Municipality, a municipality in Yucatán, Mexico
  - Teya, Mexico, the seat of that municipality
- Teya Penkova, a Bulgarian footballer
- Teya, Russia, a rural locality (a settlement) in Severo-Yeniseysky District of Krasnoyarsk Krai, Russia
- Hacienda San Ildefonso Teya, a former henequen plantation in Yucatán, Mexico.
- Teya (singer), an Austrian singer and songwriter of Serbian descent
- Teya Dora, a Serbian singer, songwriter, and producer
