= Chuchub =

Chuchub may refer to:

- Chuchub, a string of Palembang pitis
- Chuchub, Mexico , a populated place in Tixméhuac Municipality, Mexico

== See also ==
- Chuchube or chuchuba, local Venezuelan Spanish name for the tropical mockingbird
- Chubchub
- Jujube
