= Ichmul =

Coordinates: 20°10′N 88°34′W

Ichmul (from Yucatec Maya Ich Mùul, “between hills”) is a small town in the Mexican state of Yucatan, municipality of Chikindzonot.
