= Seyé Municipality =

Municipality in the Mexican state of Yucatán

Seyé
- Municipality
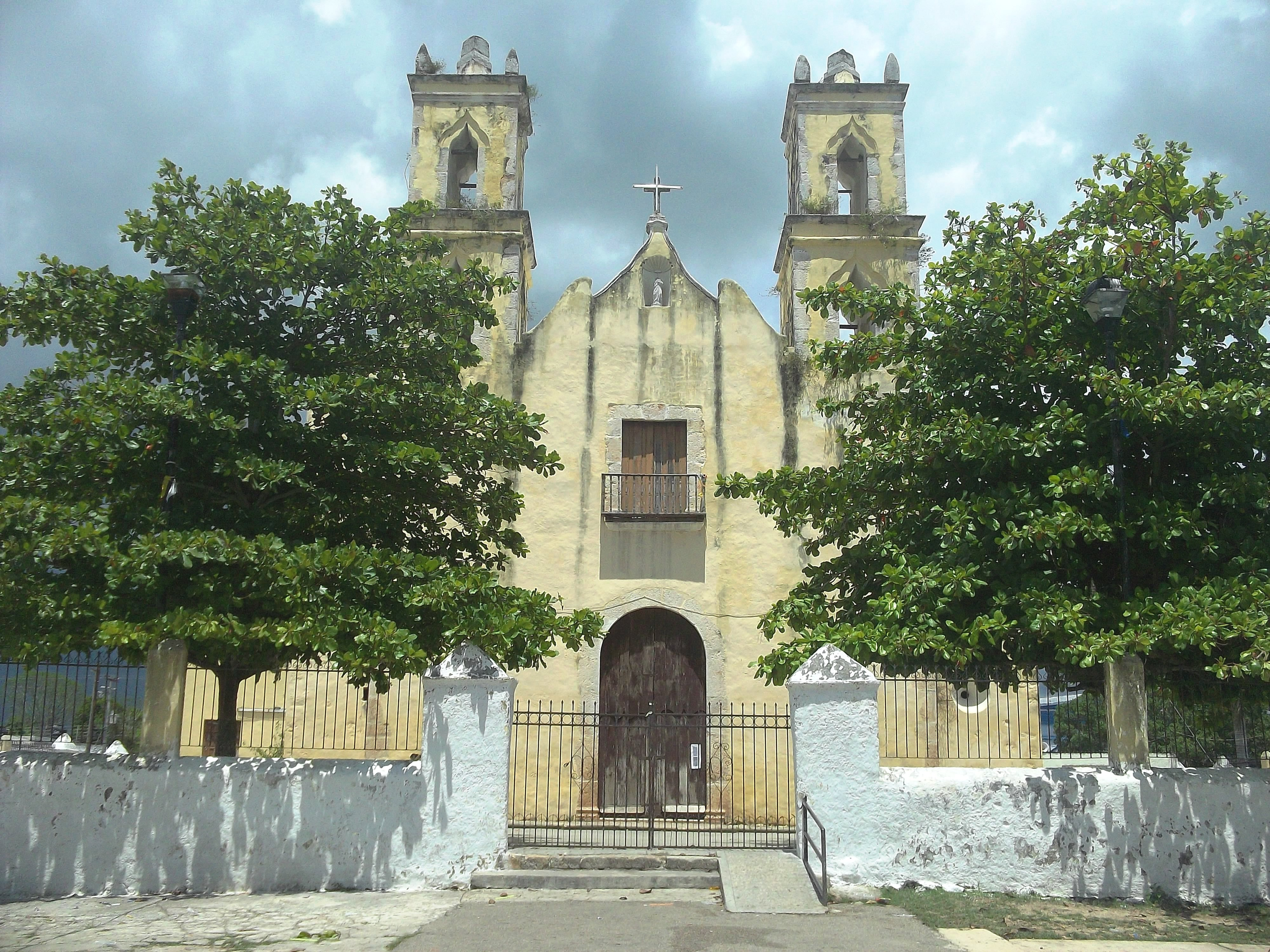
- Church of San Bartolomé Apóstol in Seyé, Yucatán

- Region 2 Noroeste #067

- Location of the municipality in Mexico
- Coordinates: 20°50′14″N 89°22′19″W
- Country: Mexico
- State: Yucatán

Government
  - Type: 2012–2015
  - Municipal President: Ermilo Dzul Huchim

Area
  - Total: 186.50 km^{2} (72.01 sq mi)
- Elevation: 6 m (20 ft)

Population (2010)
  - Total: 9,276
- Time zone: UTC-6 (Central Standard Time)
- INEGI Code: 009
- Major Airport: Merida (Manuel Crescencio Rejón) International Airport
- IATA Code: MID
- ICAO Code: MMMD

Seyé Municipality (In the Yucatec Maya Language: “little ladder”) is a municipality in the Mexican state of Yucatán containing 186.50 km^{2} of land and located roughly 38 km southeast of the city of Mérida.

== History ==
There is no accurate data on when the town was founded, though it existed before the conquest and in antiquity belonged to the chieftainship of Hocabail-Homún. At colonization, Seyé became part of the encomienda system with Alonso de Rojas recorded as the encomendero in 1579. He was followed by successors Joaquín Gómez (1607), Antonio Gómez Pacheco (1647) and Pablo de Aguilar (1688).

In 1821, Yucatán was declared independent of the Spanish Crown. In 1825 the area was part of the Beneficios Bajos region, with its headquarters in Sotuta.

== Governance ==
The municipal president is elected for a term of three years. The president appoints seven Councilpersons to serve on the board for three year terms, as the Secretary and councilors of public cleanliness, ecology, police, public services, street lighting, trails and markets, and nomenclature.

The Municipal Council administers the business of the municipality. It is responsible for budgeting and expenditures and producing all required reports for all branches of the municipal administration. Annually it determines educational standards for schools.

The Police Commissioners ensure public order and safety. They are tasked with enforcing regulations, distributing materials and administering rulings of general compliance issued by the council.

== Communities ==
The head of the municipality is Seyé, Yucatán. There are two other major population centers, Holactún and San Bernardino. Within its municipal jurisdiction are eight rancheras with minimal population, which include: Mucchan, Nohcham, Panabá, San Pedro, San Salvador, Santa María, Xteché and Xukú. There are also four haciendas: Macal, Verna, Santo Domingo and Xcehus. The major population areas are shown below:

Community	Population
Entire Municipality (2010)	9,276
Holactún	616 in 2005
San Bernardino	233 in 2005
Seyé	8080 in 2005

== Local festivals ==
Every year from 23 to 27 of August the feast of Saint Bartholomew is celebrated.

== Tourist attractions ==
- Temple of San Bartolomé
- Municipal Palace
- Hacienda Xcehus
