= Tekantó =

Town in the Mexican state of Yucatán

- Municipal seat
- Location within Yucatán (state)
- Coordinates: 21°00′38″N 89°06′20″W
- Country: Mexico
- State: Yucatán
- Municipality: Tekantó
- Elevation: 8 m (26 ft)

Population (2010)
  - Total: 3,105

Tekantó is a town and the municipal seat of the Tekantó Municipality, Yucatán in Mexico.
