= Tetiz Municipality =

Municipality in the Mexican state of Yucatán

Tetiz
- Municipality
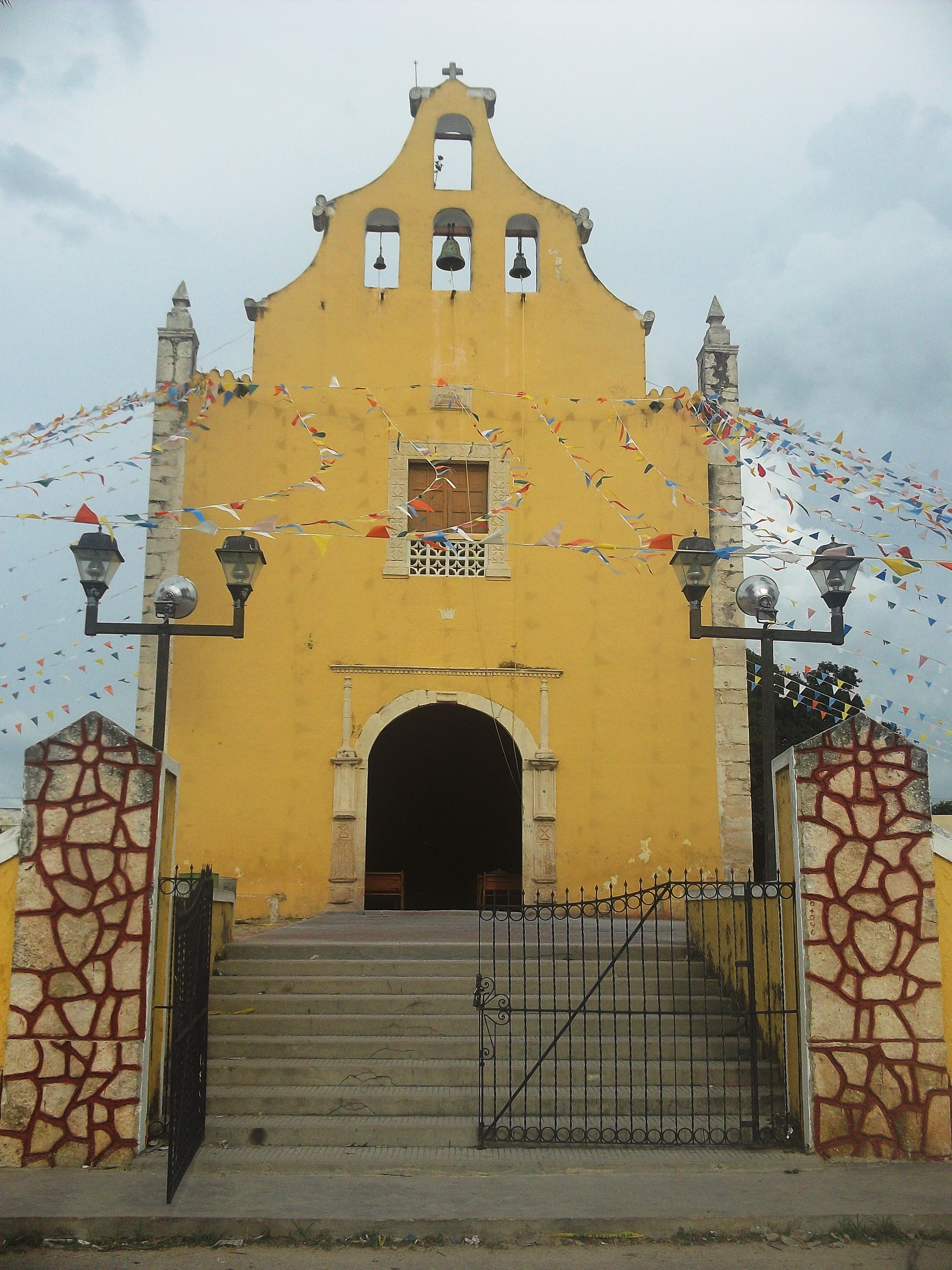
- Principal Church of Tetiz, Yucatán

- Region 1 Poniente #087

- Location of the Municipality in Mexico
- Coordinates: 20°57′44″N 89°56′02″W
- Country: Mexico
- State: Yucatán
- Mexico Ind.: 1821
- Yucatán Est.: 1824

Government
  - Type: 2012–2015
  - Municipal President: Jesús Damián Chan Caab

Area
  - Total: 180.11 km^{2} (69.54 sq mi)
- Elevation: 7 m (23 ft)

Population (2010)
  - Total: 4,725
  - Density: 26.23/km^{2} (67.95/sq mi)
  - Demonym: Umanense
- Time zone: UTC-6 (Central Standard Time)
- INEGI Code: 087
- Major Airport: Merida (Manuel Crescencio Rejón) International Airport
- IATA Code: MID
- ICAO Code: MMMD

Tetiz Municipality (Yucatec Maya: "place of the sweet potato") is a municipality in the Mexican state of Yucatán containing 180.11 km^{2} of land and is located roughly 30 kilometres (19 mi) west of the city of Mérida.

== History ==
There is no accurate data on when the town was founded, but it was a settlement before the conquest and was located in the chieftainship of Ak Canul. After colonization, the area became part of the encomienda system with various encomenderos, including Pablo de Aguilar and Alonso Hernández between 1700 and 1750.

Yucatán declared its independence from the Spanish Crown in 1821 and in 1825 the area was assigned to the Lower Camino Real under the Hunucma Municipality. In 1918 the area was confirmed as its own municipality.

== Governance ==
The municipal president is elected for a three-year term. The town council has four councilpersons, who serve as Secretary and councilors of heritage and public works; police and transit; public services, education and health; and parks, gardens and ecology.

== Communities ==
The head of the municipality is Tetiz, Yucatán. The municipality has 10 other populated places including Homote, Kooté, Muxupilo, Nohuayum, San Antonio, San Antonio Viudas, San Francisco, Toxix and Yulca. The significant populations are shown below:

Community	Population
Entire Municipality (2010)	4,725
Nohuayún	712 in 2005
Tetiz	3747 in 2005

== Local festivals ==
Every year from 10 to 15 August the town holds a festival in honor of our Lady of the Asunción.

== Tourist attractions ==
- Church of San Bernardino, built in the colonial era
- Hacienda Nohuayún
- Hacienda Santa Cecilia
