= Teabo =

Town in the Mexican state of Yucatán

- Municipal seat
- Location within Yucatán (state)
- Coordinates: 20°23′59″N 89°17′04″W
- Country: Mexico
- State: Yucatán
- Municipality: Teabo
- Elevation: 22 m (72 ft)

Population (2010)
  - Total: 6,115

Teabo is a town and the municipal seat of the Teabo Municipality, Yucatán in Mexico.
