= Tepakán =

Municipality in Yucatán, Mexico

- Municipality
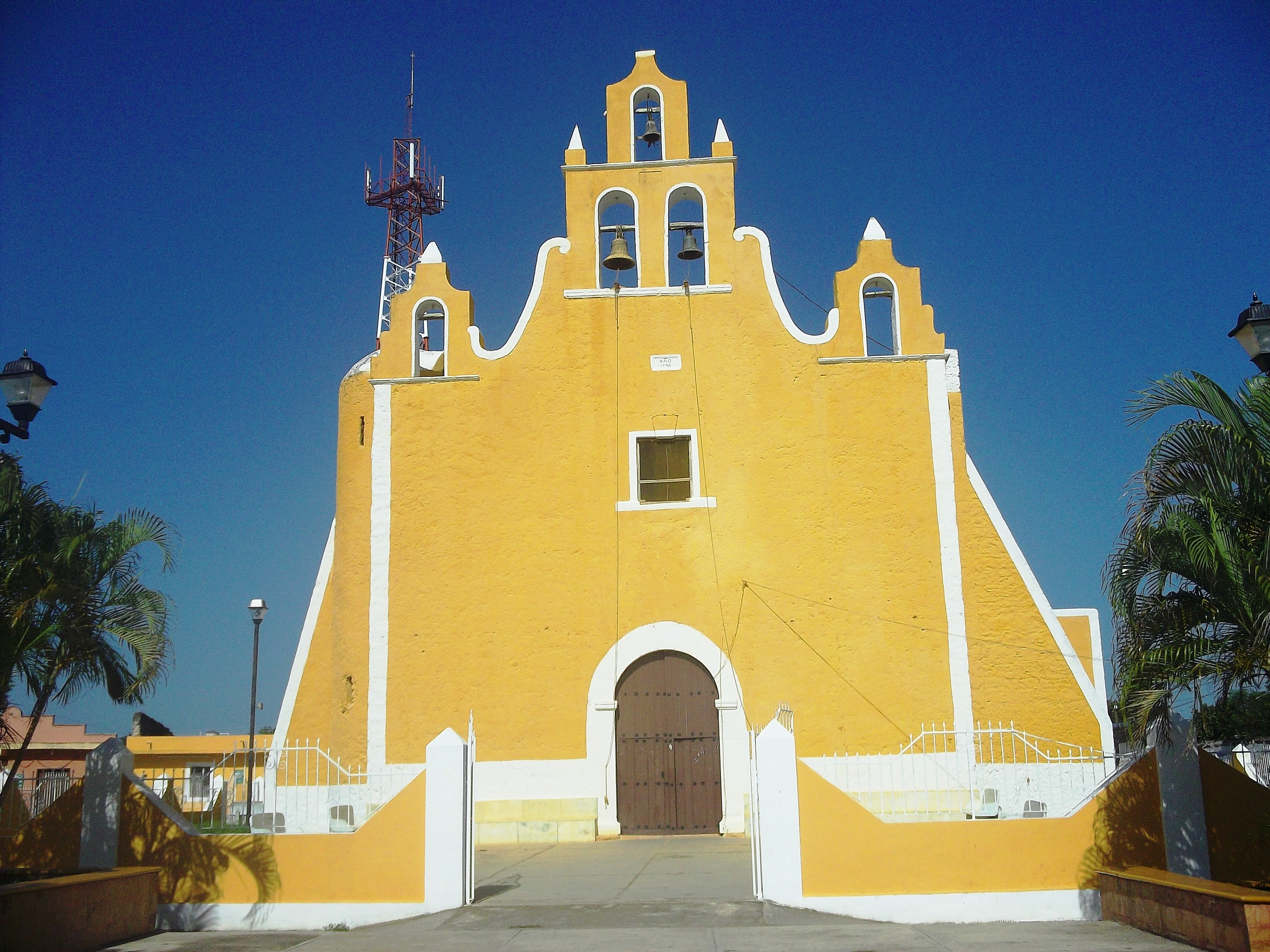
- Principal Church of Tepakán, Yucatán

- Region 3 Centro #086

- Location of the Municipality in Mexico
- Coordinates: 21°02′55″N 89°02′20″W
- Country: Mexico
- State: Yucatán

Government
  - Type: 2012–2015
  - Municipal President: Weyler Aaron Coral Manrique

Area
  - Total: 134.13 km^{2} (51.79 sq mi)
- Elevation: 9 m (30 ft)

Population (2010)
  - Total: 2,226
- Time zone: UTC-6 (Central Standard Time)
- INEGI Code: 009
- Major Airport: Merida (Manuel Crescencio Rejón) International Airport
- IATA Code: MID
- ICAO Code: MMMD

Tepakán (in the Yucatec Maya language, “place where pakán fruit [similar to tuna] is found”) is a municipality in the Mexican state of Yucatán. Containing 134.13 km^{2} (51.79 sq mi) of land, it is roughly 70 km (43 mi) east of the city of Mérida.

== History ==
During pre-Hispanic times, the area was part of the chieftainship of Ah-Kin-Chel. After the conquest the area became part of the encomienda system with Cristóbal Sánchez as the encomendero in 1581. Subsequent holders of the trusteeship Esteban Tello Aguilar in 1700, Ana de Varreda Villegas in 1705, Antonia Pacheco and Juan Nepomuceno Calderón.

Yucatán declared its independence from the Spanish Crown in 1821. On 24 July 1867 a decree passed to reorganize the divisions within the territory and Tepakán was assigned to Izamal Municipality. In 1988, it was made its own municipality.

== Governance ==
The municipal president is elected for a three-year term. The town council has four councilpersons, who serve as Secretary and councilors of ecology, public works, ecology, roads and markets, and cemeteries.

The Municipal Council administers the business of the municipality. It is responsible for budgeting and expenditures and producing all required reports for all branches of the municipal administration. Annually it determines educational standards for schools.

The Police Commissioners ensure public order and safety. They are tasked with enforcing regulations, distributing materials and administering rulings of general compliance issued by the council.

== Communities ==
The head of the municipality is Tepakán, Yucatán. The other populated areas are Jabada, Kantirix, Kantunich, Pochuná, Hacienda Los Reyes, Rosario, Tecate and Xemu. The significant populations are shown below:

Community	Population
Entire Municipality (2010)	2,226
Kantirix	168 in 2005
Tepakán	1923 in 2005

== Local festivals ==
Every year on 12 April the feast of St. Anthony, patron saint of the village, is held.

== Tourist attractions ==
- Church of La Asunción
- Church of San Antonio
- Hacienda Kantirix
- Hacienda Poccheiná
- Hacienda Sahcatzín
