= Municipalities of Yucatán =

List of municipalities of Mexican state

Map of Mexico with Yucatán highlighted

Yucatán is a state in southeastern Mexico that is divided into 106 municipalities, organized into 7 administrative regions. According to the 2020 INEGI census, it is the twenty-second most populated state with 2,320,898 inhabitants and the 20th largest by land area spanning 39,524.4 square kilometres (15,260.5 sq mi).

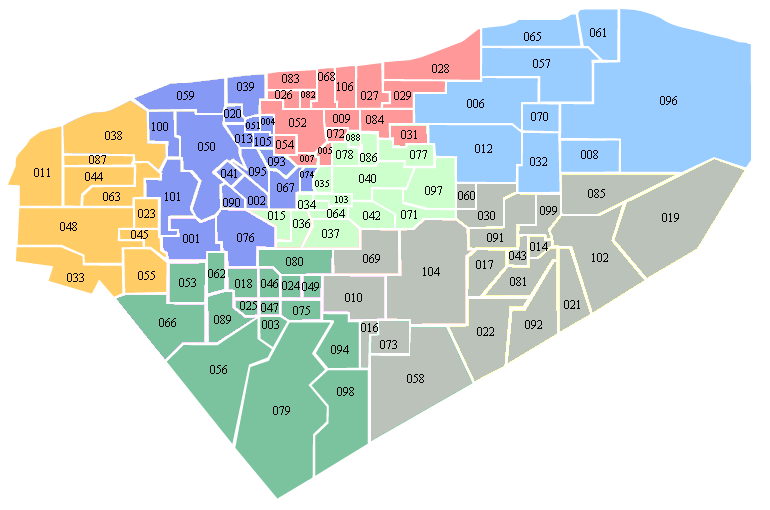
Municipalities of Yucatán by region

Municipalities in Yucatán are administratively autonomous of the state according to the 115th article of the 1917 Constitution of Mexico. Every three years, citizens elect a municipal president (Spanish: presidente municipal) by a plurality voting system who heads a concurrently elected municipal council (ayuntamiento) responsible for providing all the public services for their constituents. The municipal council consists of a variable number of trustees and councillors (regidores y síndicos). Municipalities are responsible for public services (such as water and sewerage), street lighting, public safety, traffic, and the maintenance of public parks, gardens and cemeteries. They may also assist the state and federal governments in education, emergency fire and medical services, environmental protection and maintenance of monuments and historical landmarks. Since 1984, they have had the power to collect property taxes and user fees, although more funds are obtained from the state and federal governments than from their own income.

The largest municipality by population is Mérida, with 995,129 residents (42.87% of the state's total), while the smallest is Quintana Roo with 976 residents. The largest municipality by land area is Tizimín which spans 3,884.80 km^{2} (1,499.93 sq mi), and the smallest is Sanahcat with 26.20 km^{2} (10.12 sq mi). The newest municipality is Chikindzonot, established in 1957.

== Municipalities ==
Largest municipalities in Yucatán by population

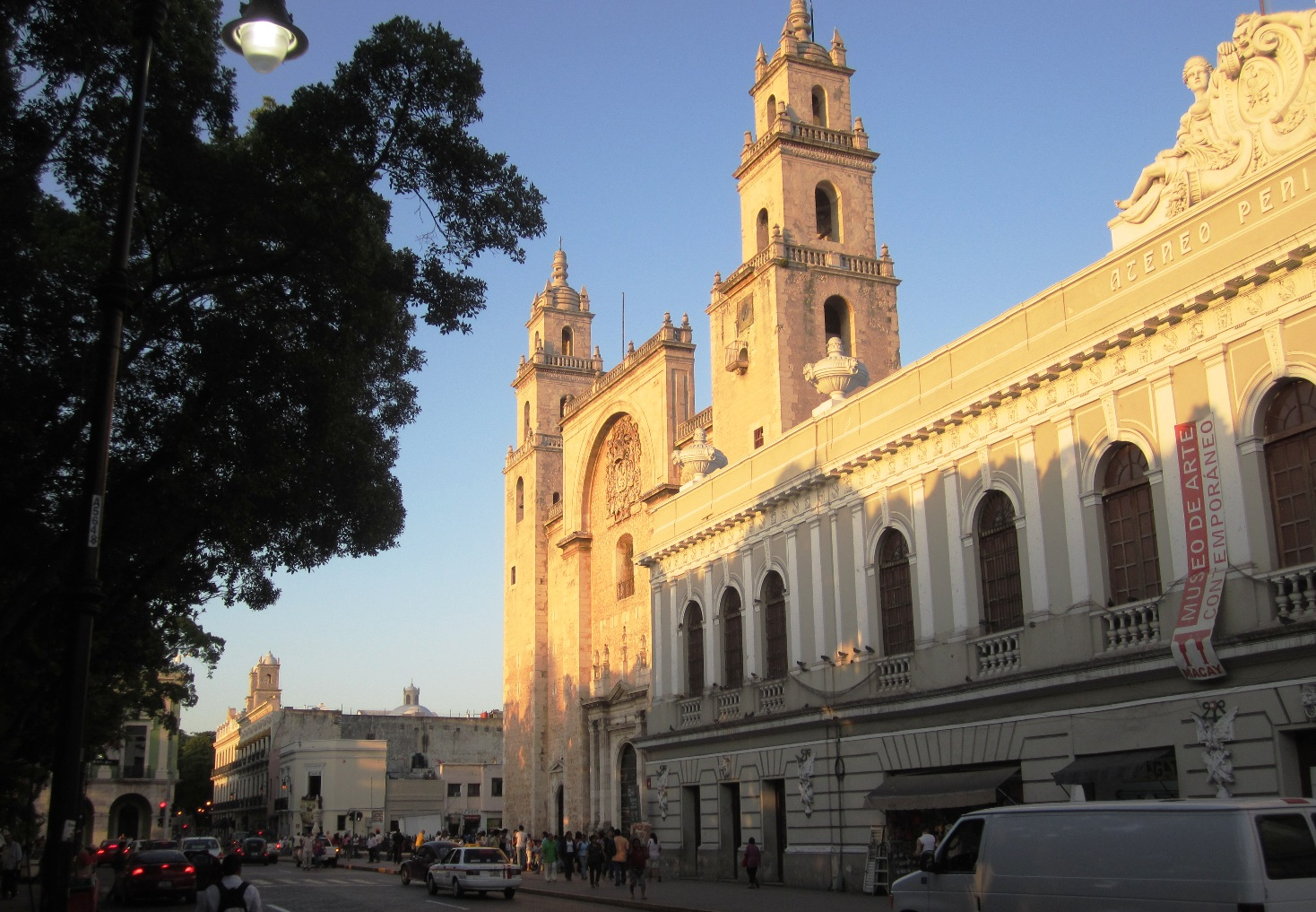
Mérida, capital and largest municipality by population in Yucatán.

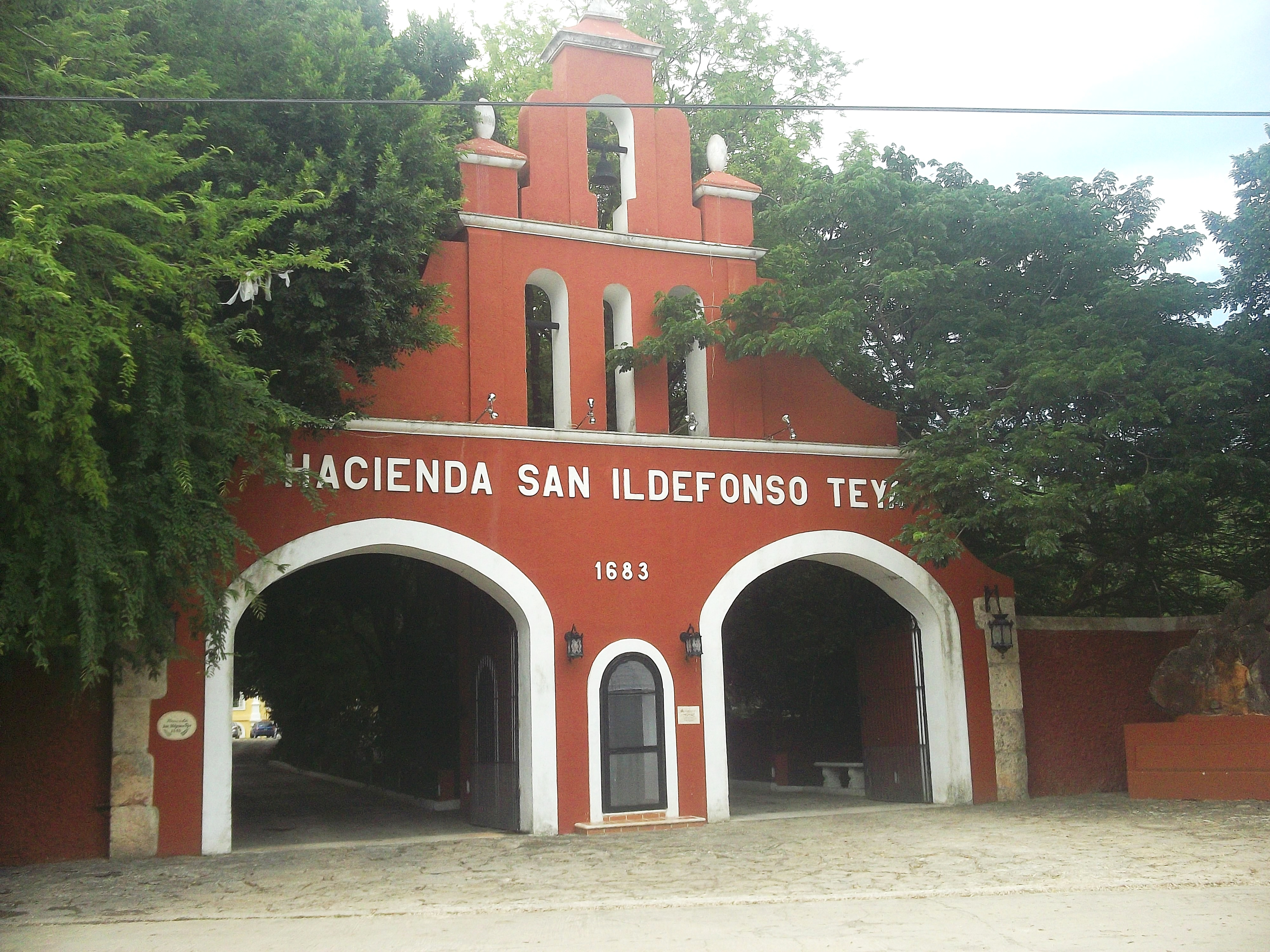
Kanasín, second largest municipality by population.

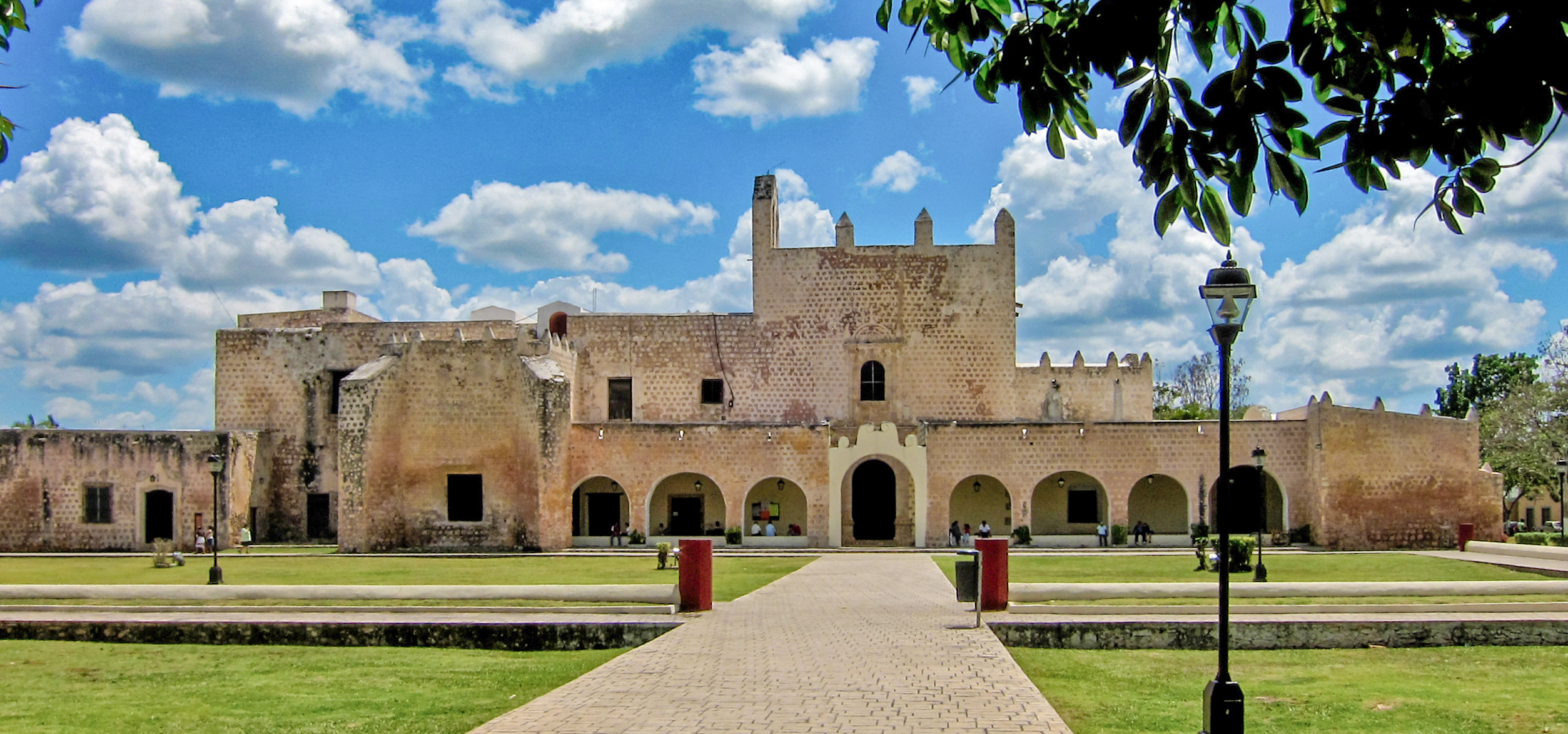
Valladolid, third largest municipality by population.

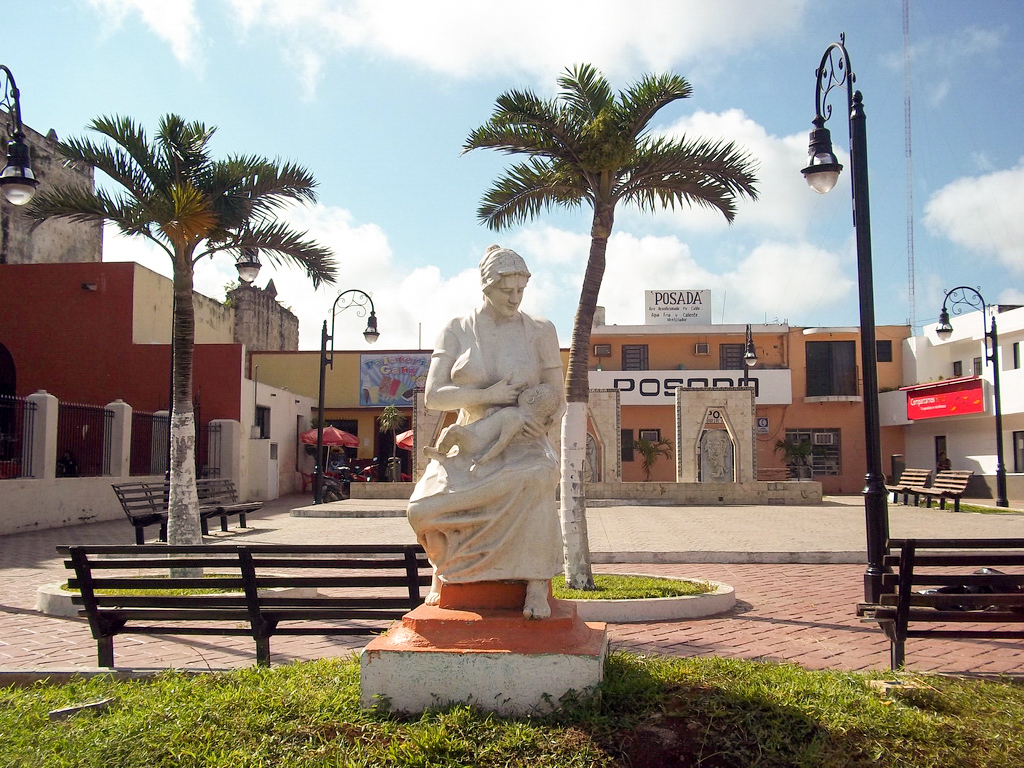
Tizimín, fourth largest municipality by population.

† State capital

Municipalities of Yucatán
Name	Municipal seat	Population (2020)	Population (2010)	Change	Land area		Population density (2020)	Incorporation date
Name	Municipal seat	Population (2020)	Population (2010)	Change	km^{2}	sq mi	Population density (2020)	Incorporation date
Abalá	Abalá	6,550	6,356	+3.1%	292.7	113.0	22.4/km^{2} (58.0/sq mi)	July 24, 1867
Acanceh	Acanceh	16,772	15,337	+9.4%	137.3	53.0	122.2/km^{2} (316.4/sq mi)	July 24, 1867
Akil (Note: Akil was merged with Tekax in 1905–1919.)	Akil	12,285	10,362	+18.6%	76.5	29.5	160.6/km^{2} (415.9/sq mi)	July 24, 1867
Baca	Baca	6,195	5,701	+8.7%	108.5	41.9	57.1/km^{2} (147.9/sq mi)	July 24, 1867
Bokobá	Bokobá	2,167	2,053	+5.6%	71.7	27.7	30.2/km^{2} (78.3/sq mi)	July 24, 1867
Buctzotz	Buctzotz	9,159	8,637	+6.0%	654.3	252.6	14.0/km^{2} (36.3/sq mi)	July 24, 1867
Cacalchén	Cacalchén	7,490	6,811	+10.0%	101.5	39.2	73.8/km^{2} (191.1/sq mi)	July 24, 1867
Calotmul	Calotmul	3,949	4,095	−3.6%	290.7	112.2	13.6/km^{2} (35.2/sq mi)	July 24, 1867
Cansahcab	Cansahcab	4,466	4,696	−4.9%	128.8	49.7	34.7/km^{2} (89.8/sq mi)	July 24, 1867
Cantamayec (Note: Cantamayec was merged with Sotuta in 1905–1927.)	Cantamayec	2,755	2,407	+14.5%	356.3	137.6	7.7/km^{2} (20.0/sq mi)	July 24, 1867
Celestún	Celestún	8,389	6,831	+22.8%	596.9	230.5	14.1/km^{2} (36.4/sq mi)	July 24, 1867
Cenotillo	Cenotillo	3,736	3,701	+0.9%	542.5	209.5	6.9/km^{2} (17.8/sq mi)	July 24, 1867
Chacsinkín	Chacsinkín	3,104	2,818	+10.1%	114.7	44.3	27.1/km^{2} (70.1/sq mi)	July 24, 1867
Chankom	Chankom	4,686	4,464	+5.0%	443.5	171.2	10.6/km^{2} (27.4/sq mi)	March 8, 1935
Chapab	Chapab	3,385	3,035	+11.5%	169.4	65.4	20.0/km^{2} (51.8/sq mi)	July 24, 1867
Chemax	Chemax	38,934	33,490	+16.3%	1,398.5	540.0	27.8/km^{2} (72.1/sq mi)	July 24, 1867
Chichimilá	Chichimilá	9,406	7,952	+18.3%	470.0	181.5	20.0/km^{2} (51.8/sq mi)	July 24, 1867
Chicxulub Pueblo	Chicxulub Pueblo	4,497	4,113	+9.3%	44.3	17.1	101.5/km^{2} (262.9/sq mi)	July 24, 1867
Chikindzonot	Chikindzonot	4,363	4,162	+4.8%	473.8	182.9	9.2/km^{2} (23.8/sq mi)	February 21, 1957
Chocholá	Chocholá	4,863	4,530	+7.4%	292.9	113.1	16.6/km^{2} (43.0/sq mi)	July 24, 1867
Chumayel	Chumayel	3,244	3,148	+3.0%	83.8	32.4	38.7/km^{2} (100.3/sq mi)	July 24, 1867
Conkal	Conkal	16,671	9,143	+82.3%	63.3	24.4	263.4/km^{2} (682.1/sq mi)	July 24, 1867
Cuncunul	Cuncunul	1,714	1,595	+7.5%	135.9	52.5	12.6/km^{2} (32.7/sq mi)	July 24, 1867
Cuzamá	Cuzamá	5,560	4,966	+12.0%	93.5	36.1	59.5/km^{2} (154.0/sq mi)	July 24, 1867
Dzán (Note: Dzán was merged with Ticul in 1905–1933.)	Dzán	6,003	4,941	+21.5%	79.9	30.8	75.1/km^{2} (194.6/sq mi)	July 24, 1867
Dzemul	Dzemul	3,622	3,489	+3.8%	174.1	67.2	20.8/km^{2} (53.9/sq mi)	July 24, 1867
Dzidzantún	Dzidzantún	8,345	8,133	+2.6%	207.5	80.1	40.2/km^{2} (104.2/sq mi)	July 24, 1867
Dzilam de Bravo (Note: Dzilam de Bravo was originally incorporated as Dzilam (puerto), changing its name on December 30, 1921. It was merged with Temax from 1905-1921.)	Dzilam de Bravo	2,936	2,463	+19.2%	432.3	166.9	6.8/km^{2} (17.6/sq mi)	July 24, 1867
Dzilam González	Dzilam González	6,240	5,905	+5.7%	506.5	195.6	12.3/km^{2} (31.9/sq mi)	July 24, 1867
Dzitás	Dzitás	4,015	3,540	+13.4%	309.6	119.5	13.0/km^{2} (33.6/sq mi)	July 24, 1867
Dzoncauich (Note: Dzoncauich was merged with Temax in 1905-1928.)	Dzoncauich	2,818	2,772	+1.7%	133.4	51.5	21.1/km^{2} (54.7/sq mi)	July 24, 1867
Espita	Espita	16,779	15,571	+7.8%	735.3	283.9	22.8/km^{2} (59.1/sq mi)	May 24, 1837
Halachó	Halachó	21,255	19,072	+11.4%	586.3	226.4	36.3/km^{2} (93.9/sq mi)	July 24, 1867
Hocabá	Hocabá	6,514	6,061	+7.5%	94.9	36.6	68.6/km^{2} (177.8/sq mi)	July 24, 1867
Hoctún	Hoctún	6,384	5,697	+12.1%	120.7	46.6	52.9/km^{2} (137.0/sq mi)	July 24, 1867
Homún	Homún	8,090	7,257	+11.5%	199.8	77.1	40.5/km^{2} (104.9/sq mi)	July 24, 1867
Huhí	Huhí	5,250	4,841	+8.4%	197.6	76.3	26.6/km^{2} (68.8/sq mi)	July 24, 1867
Hunucmá	Hunucmá	35,137	30,731	+14.3%	839.6	324.2	41.8/km^{2} (108.4/sq mi)	April 6, 1825
Ixil	Ixil	4,186	3,803	+10.1%	136.8	52.8	30.6/km^{2} (79.3/sq mi)	July 24, 1867
Izamal	Izamal	28,555	25,980	+9.9%	458.7	177.1	62.3/km^{2} (161.2/sq mi)	April 6, 1825
Kanasín	Kanasín	141,939	78,709	+80.3%	106.3	41.0	1,335.3/km^{2} (3,458.3/sq mi)	July 24, 1867
Kantunil	Kantunil	5,553	5,502	+0.9%	199.7	77.1	27.8/km^{2} (72.0/sq mi)	July 24, 1867
Kaua (Note: Kaua was merged with Uayma in 1919-1922 and with Cuncunul in 1922-1935.)	Kaua	3,405	2,761	+23.3%	137.4	53.1	24.8/km^{2} (64.2/sq mi)	July 24, 1867
Kinchil	Kinchil	7,530	6,571	+14.6%	355.8	137.4	21.2/km^{2} (54.8/sq mi)	July 24, 1867
Kopomá (Note: Kopomá was merged with Maxcanú in 1905–1935.)	Kopomá	2,677	2,449	+9.3%	157.7	60.9	17.0/km^{2} (44.0/sq mi)	July 24, 1867
Mama	Mama	3,296	2,888	+14.1%	100.4	38.8	32.8/km^{2} (85.0/sq mi)	April 6, 1825
Maní	Maní	5,968	5,250	+13.7%	126.8	49.0	47.1/km^{2} (121.9/sq mi)	July 24, 1867
Maxcanú	Maxcanú	23,991	21,704	+10.5%	910.8	351.7	26.3/km^{2} (68.2/sq mi)	May 24, 1837
Mayapán	Mayapán	3,965	3,269	+21.3%	93.6	36.1	42.4/km^{2} (109.7/sq mi)	August 16, 1935
Mérida	Mérida†	995,129	830,732	+19.8%	874.4	337.6	1,138.1/km^{2} (2,947.6/sq mi)	April 6, 1825
Mocochá	Mocochá	3,430	3,071	+11.7%	47.2	18.2	72.7/km^{2} (188.2/sq mi)	July 24, 1867
Motul	Motul de Carrillo Puerto	37,804	33,978	+11.3%	320.6	123.8	117.9/km^{2} (305.4/sq mi)	May 24, 1837
Muna	Muna	13,494	12,336	+9.4%	397.3	153.4	34.0/km^{2} (88.0/sq mi)	July 24, 1867
Muxupip (Note: Muxupip was merged with Motul in 1905–1927.)	Muxupip	2,990	2,755	+8.5%	71.6	27.6	41.8/km^{2} (108.2/sq mi)	July 24, 1867
Opichén	Opichén	7,080	6,285	+12.6%	259.4	100.2	27.3/km^{2} (70.7/sq mi)	July 24, 1867
Oxkutzcab	Oxkutzcab	33,854	29,325	+15.4%	863.0	333.2	39.2/km^{2} (101.6/sq mi)	April 6, 1825
Panabá	Panabá	7,766	7,461	+4.1%	665.3	256.9	11.7/km^{2} (30.2/sq mi)	July 24, 1867
Peto	Peto	25,954	24,159	+7.4%	1,055.0	407.3	24.6/km^{2} (63.7/sq mi)	October 27, 1835
Progreso	Progreso	66,008	53,958	+22.3%	430.2	166.1	153.4/km^{2} (397.4/sq mi)	July 24, 1867
Quintana Roo	Quintana Roo	976	942	+3.6%	103.5	40.0	9.4/km^{2} (24.4/sq mi)	October 8, 1931
Río Lagartos	Río Lagartos	3,974	3,438	+15.6%	337.6	130.3	11.8/km^{2} (30.5/sq mi)	July 24, 1867
Sacalum	Sacalum	4,962	4,589	+8.1%	198.8	76.8	25.0/km^{2} (64.6/sq mi)	July 24, 1867
Samahil (Note: Samahil was merged with Hunucmá in 1905-1918.)	Samahil	5,631	5,008	+12.4%	160.6	62.0	35.1/km^{2} (90.8/sq mi)	July 24, 1867
San Felipe (Note: San Felipe was merged with Tizimín in 1905–1935.)	San Felipe	2,118	1,839	+15.2%	452.1	174.6	4.7/km^{2} (12.1/sq mi)	July 24, 1867
Sanahcat (Note: Sanahcat was merged with Sotuta in 1905-1924.)	Sanahcat	1,701	1,619	+5.1%	26.2	10.1	64.9/km^{2} (168.2/sq mi)	July 24, 1867
Santa Elena	Santa Elena	4,220	3,833	+10.1%	513.8	198.4	8.2/km^{2} (21.3/sq mi)	July 24, 1867
Seyé	Seyé	10,053	9,276	+8.4%	178.1	68.8	56.4/km^{2} (146.2/sq mi)	July 24, 1867
Sinanché	Sinanché	3,206	3,126	+2.6%	134.3	51.9	23.9/km^{2} (61.8/sq mi)	July 24, 1867
Sotuta	Sotuta	8,967	8,449	+6.1%	545.9	210.8	16.4/km^{2} (42.5/sq mi)	April 6, 1825
Sucilá	Sucilá	3,971	3,930	+1.0%	307.2	118.6	12.9/km^{2} (33.5/sq mi)	July 24, 1867
Sudzal (Note: Sudzal was merged with Izamal in 1905-1932.)	Sudzal	1,949	1,689	+15.4%	221.6	85.6	8.8/km^{2} (22.8/sq mi)	July 24, 1867
Suma (Note: Suma was merged with Teya in 1905–1919 and with Cansahcab in 1919-1921.)	Suma de Hidalgo	1,857	1,876	−1.0%	87.9	33.9	21.1/km^{2} (54.7/sq mi)	July 24, 1867
Tahdziú	Tahdziú	5,854	4,447	+31.6%	241.4	93.2	24.3/km^{2} (62.8/sq mi)	July 24, 1867
Tahmek	Tahmek	3,774	3,609	+4.6%	102.5	39.6	36.8/km^{2} (95.4/sq mi)	July 24, 1867
Teabo	Teabo	6,921	6,205	+11.5%	224.6	86.7	30.8/km^{2} (79.8/sq mi)	July 24, 1867
Tecoh	Tecoh	17,939	16,200	+10.7%	367.5	141.9	48.8/km^{2} (126.4/sq mi)	November 30, 1840
Tekal (Note: Tekal was merged with Izamal in 1905-1930.)	Tekal de Venegas	2,683	2,606	+3.0%	199.6	77.1	13.4/km^{2} (34.8/sq mi)	July 24, 1867
Tekantó	Tekantó	3,747	3,683	+1.7%	79.8	30.8	47.0/km^{2} (121.6/sq mi)	July 24, 1867
Tekax	Tekax de Álvaro Obregón	45,062	40,547	+11.1%	2,768.4	1,068.9	16.3/km^{2} (42.2/sq mi)	July 24, 1867
Tekit	Tekit	11,020	9,884	+11.5%	281.0	108.5	39.2/km^{2} (101.6/sq mi)	July 24, 1867
Tekom (Note: Tekom was merged with Valladolid in 1905–1919.)	Tekom	3,355	3,100	+8.2%	273.1	105.4	12.3/km^{2} (31.8/sq mi)	July 24, 1867
Telchac Pueblo	Telchac Pueblo	3,512	3,557	−1.3%	57.9	22.4	60.7/km^{2} (157.1/sq mi)	July 24, 1867
Telchac Puerto (Note: Telchac Puerto was merged with Motul in 1905–1927.)	Telchac Puerto	1,915	1,726	+11.0%	65.2	25.2	29.4/km^{2} (76.1/sq mi)	July 24, 1867
Temax	Temax	7,037	6,817	+3.2%	337.6	130.3	20.8/km^{2} (54.0/sq mi)	May 24, 1837
Temozón	Temozón	16,680	14,801	+12.7%	706.6	272.8	23.6/km^{2} (61.1/sq mi)	July 24, 1867
Tepakán	Tepakán	2,133	2,226	−4.2%	108.7	42.0	19.6/km^{2} (50.8/sq mi)	July 24, 1867
Tetiz	Tetiz	5,464	4,725	+15.6%	336.9	130.1	16.2/km^{2} (42.0/sq mi)	July 24, 1867
Teya	Teya	1,917	1,977	−3.0%	77.9	30.1	24.6/km^{2} (63.7/sq mi)	July 24, 1867
Ticul	Ticul	40,495	37,685	+7.5%	339.9	131.2	119.1/km^{2} (308.6/sq mi)	May 24, 1837
Timucuy	Timucuy	7,503	6,833	+9.8%	134.6	52.0	55.7/km^{2} (144.4/sq mi)	July 24, 1867
Tinum	Tinum	12,700	11,421	+11.2%	470.5	181.7	27.0/km^{2} (69.9/sq mi)	July 24, 1867
Tixcacalcupul	Tixcacalcupul	7,888	6,665	+18.3%	502.4	194.0	15.7/km^{2} (40.7/sq mi)	July 24, 1867
Tixkokob	Tixkokob	18,420	17,176	+7.2%	172.3	66.5	106.9/km^{2} (276.9/sq mi)	July 24, 1867
Tixmehuac	Tixmehuac	5,444	4,746	+14.7%	230.2	88.9	23.6/km^{2} (61.3/sq mi)	July 24, 1867
Tixpéhual (Note: Tixpéhual was merged with Tixkokob in 1905-1929.)	Tixpéhual	5,690	5,388	+5.6%	70.9	27.4	80.3/km^{2} (207.9/sq mi)	July 24, 1867
Tizimín	Tizimín	80,672	73,138	+10.3%	3,884.8	1,499.9	20.8/km^{2} (53.8/sq mi)	April 6, 1825
Tunkás	Tunkás	3,684	3,464	+6.4%	413.2	159.5	8.9/km^{2} (23.1/sq mi)	July 24, 1867
Tzucacab	Tzucacab	15,346	14,011	+9.5%	765.6	295.6	20.0/km^{2} (51.9/sq mi)	July 24, 1867
Uayma	Uayma	4,191	3,782	+10.8%	187.7	72.5	22.3/km^{2} (57.8/sq mi)	July 24, 1867
Ucú (Note: Ucú was merged with Hunucmá in 1905-1925.)	Ucú	4,049	3,469	+16.7%	130.8	50.5	31.0/km^{2} (80.2/sq mi)	July 24, 1867
Umán	Umán	69,147	50,993	+35.6%	354.1	136.7	195.3/km^{2} (505.8/sq mi)	July 24, 1867
Valladolid	Valladolid	85,460	74,217	+15.1%	1,078.2	416.3	79.3/km^{2} (205.3/sq mi)	April 6, 1825
Xocchel	Xocchel	3,451	3,236	+6.6%	110.8	42.8	31.1/km^{2} (80.7/sq mi)	July 24, 1867
Yaxcabá (Note: Yaxcabá was merged with Sotuta in 1905-1923.)	Yaxcabá	16,350	14,802	+10.5%	1,474.2	569.2	11.1/km^{2} (28.7/sq mi)	November 30, 1840
Yaxkukul	Yaxkukul	3,293	2,868	+14.8%	49.5	19.1	66.5/km^{2} (172.3/sq mi)	July 24, 1867
Yobaín	Yobaín	2,215	2,137	+3.6%	131.8	50.9	16.8/km^{2} (43.5/sq mi)	July 24, 1867
Yucatán	—	2,320,898	1,955,577	+18.7%	39,524.4	15,260.5	58.7/km^{2} (152.1/sq mi)	—
Mexico	—	126,014,024	112,336,538	+12.2%	1,960,646.7	757,010	64.3/km^{2} (166.5/sq mi)	—
