= Sudzal Municipality =

Municipality in the Mexican state of Yucatán

Sudzal
- Municipality
- Region 3 Centro #071

- Location of the Municipality in Mexico
- Coordinates: 20°52′11″N 88°59′18″W
- Country: Mexico
- State: Yucatán

Government
  - Type: 2012–2015
  - Municipal President: Kithy Janet May Chuc

Area
  - Total: 436.87 km^{2} (168.68 sq mi)
- Elevation: 6 m (20 ft)

Population (2010)
  - Total: 1,689
- Time zone: UTC-6 (Central Standard Time)
- INEGI Code: 009
- Major Airport: Merida (Manuel Crescencio Rejón) International Airport
- IATA Code: MID
- ICAO Code: MMMD

Sudzal Municipality (In the Yucatec Maya Language: “water where the Suudz tree is”) is a municipality in the Mexican state of Yucatán. It is located about 75 km east of the city of Mérida. Its area is 436.87 km^{2}.

== History ==
In ancient times, the area of Sudzal was part of the chieftainship of Ah Kin Chel until the conquest. At colonization, it became part of the encomienda system with Alonso de Rojas recorded as the encomendero in 1576. Later endomenderos were Pablo de Aguilar and Alonso Hernández de Cervera, who was in control of the ecomienda in 1700.

In 1821, Yucatán was declared independence from the Spanish Crown. In 1905, Sudzal belonged to the region headquartered in Izamal. In 1932, the village Sudzal became a free municipality and was separated from Izamal.

== Governance ==
The municipal president is elected for a term of three years. The president appoints four Councilpersons to serve on the board for three year terms, as the Secretary and councilor of public works, and councilors of schools, potable water and cemeteries, and parks and public gardens.

The Municipal Council administers the business of the municipality. It is responsible for budgeting and expenditures and producing all required reports for all branches of the municipal administration. Annually it determines educational standards for schools.

The Police Commissioners ensure public order and safety. They are tasked with enforcing regulations, distributing materials and administering rulings of general compliance issued by the council.

== Communities ==
The head of the municipality is Sudzal, Yucatán. There are 13 other population centers, including Chalanté, Chumbec, Hacienda Dcum, Kancabchén de Valencia, Kaua Chen, Finca Kolax, Maben, Majas, Hacienda San Isidro, San José, Tohtol, San Miguel, Hacienda Tzalam. The major population areas are shown below:

Community	Population
Entire Municipality (2010)	1,689
Chumbec	237 in 2005
Hacienda Tzalam	124 in 2005
Sudzal	1141 in 2005

== Local festivals ==
Every year on 15 August the feast of the Virgin of the Assumption is celebrated.

== Tourist attractions ==
- Church of Our Lady of the Assumption
- Archeological sites at Acún, Santa Catalina, and Tocbatz
- Hacienda Chumbec
- Hacienda San Antonio Chalanté
- Hacienda San Isidro
- Hacienda Tzalam
