= Huhí Municipality =

Municipality in the Mexican state of Yucatán

Huhí
- Municipality
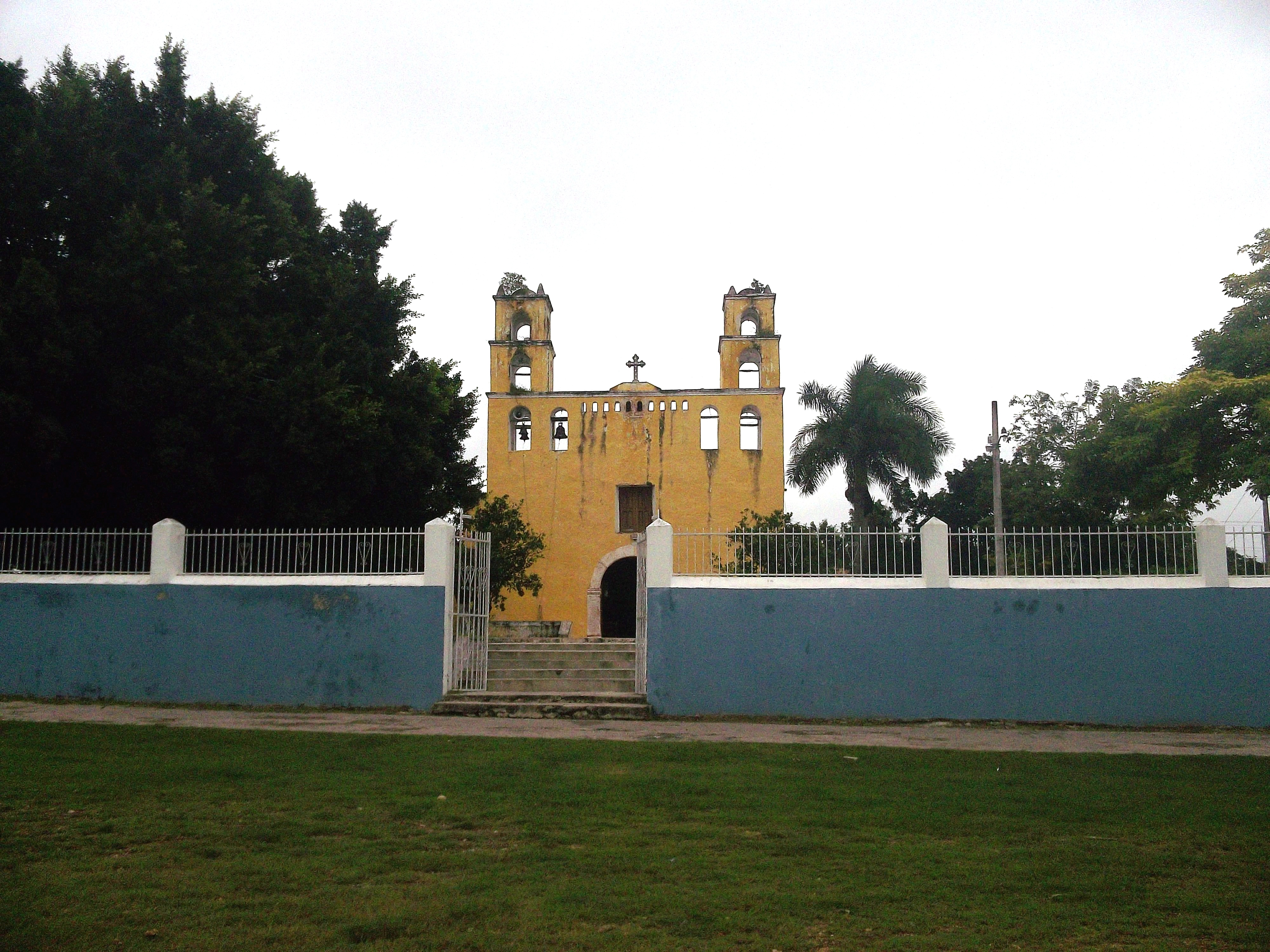
- Principal Church of Huhí, Yucatán

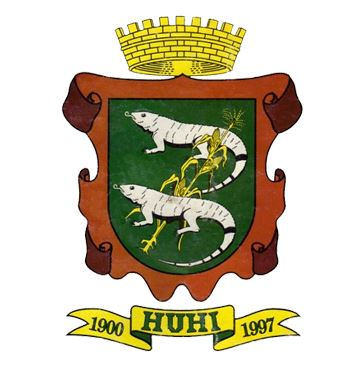
- Coat of arms

- Municipal location in Yucatán

- Location of the Municipality in Mexico
- Coordinates: 20°43′31″N 89°09′41″W
- Country: Mexico
- State: Yucatán

Government
  - Type: 2012–2015
  - Municipal President: Roger Marcelo Espinola Benitez

Area
  - Total: 191.61 km^{2} (73.98 sq mi)
- Elevation: 10 m (33 ft)

Population (2010)
  - Total: 4,841
- Time zone: UTC-6 (Central Standard Time)
- INEGI Code: 037
- Major Airport: Merida (Manuel Crescencio Rejón) International Airport
- IATA Code: MID
- ICAO Code: MMMD

Huhí Municipality (Spanish pronunciation: [xuˈxi], in the Yucatec Maya language: “place of the iguanas”) is a municipality in the Mexican state of Yucatán containing 191.61 square kilometres (73.98 sq mi) of land and located roughly 70 kilometres (43 mi) southeast of the city of Mérida. It is bounded on the north by Sanahcat, on the south by Sotuta and Tekit, and on the east and west by Kantunil Homún.

== History ==
During pre-Hispanic times, the town existed but it is unclear which chieftainship it was part of. After the conquest the area became part of the encomienda system. One of the first encomendaros was Joaquín Cárdenas y Díaz, with 734 Indians in his custody.

Yucatán declared its independence from the Spanish Crown in 1821 and in 1825, the area was assigned to the Beneficios Bajos region with its headquarters in Sotuta. In 1900 Huhí was elevated to a municipality. Its development began in 1821.

Huhi received its Shield and Weapons Certification on 30 November 1997. The Coat of Arms represents agriculture in the form of corn, ecology in the form of species of iguana which is the name of the "Huhi" municipality (two iguanas in silver colour set in green background super imposed over green corn), has a Corona mural of a bell corresponding to the municipal category of town, is rectangular in shape in the ratio of 6 (width) to 5 (height), is in the form of a golden ribbon badge with Huhi lyrics and the years 1900 and 1997 inscribed on it; all these features are shown in the shield bracket which is of skin color.

== Governance ==
The municipal president is elected for a three-year term. The town council has four councilpersons, who serve as Secretary and councilors of educational and ecology; public services; and highways and security.

The Municipal Council administers the business of the municipality. It is responsible for budgeting and expenditures and producing all required reports for all branches of the municipal administration. Annually it determines educational standards for schools.

The Police Commissioners ensure public order and safety. They are tasked with enforcing regulations, distributing materials and administering rulings of general compliance issued by the council.

== Communities ==
The head of the municipality is Huhí, Yucatán. The other populated areas are Choyoc, Guadalupe, San Miguel, Tixcacal Quintero, Usil, and Yaxché. The significant populations are shown below: The present president of the municipality is Roger Marcelo Benítez Espínola (2012–15).

Community	Population
Entire Municipality (2010)	4,841
Huhí	4374 in 2005
Tixcacal Quintero	102 in 2005

On the electoral roles the municipality belongs to the Fifth Federal Electoral District and Local Fourteenth ward.

== Agriculture ==
The economy of the town is agriculture based and crops grown in communal lands is corn beans, sisal and squash.

== Local festivals ==
Every year a celebration in honor of St. Peter is held from the 24th through 29 June.

== Tourist attractions ==
- Church of St. Peter built in the 18th century
- Cenote Ixim Haa
- Hacienda Kaan Ac
- Hacienda Tixcacal Quintero
