= Samahil Municipality =

Municipality in the Mexican state of Yucatán

Samahil
- Municipality
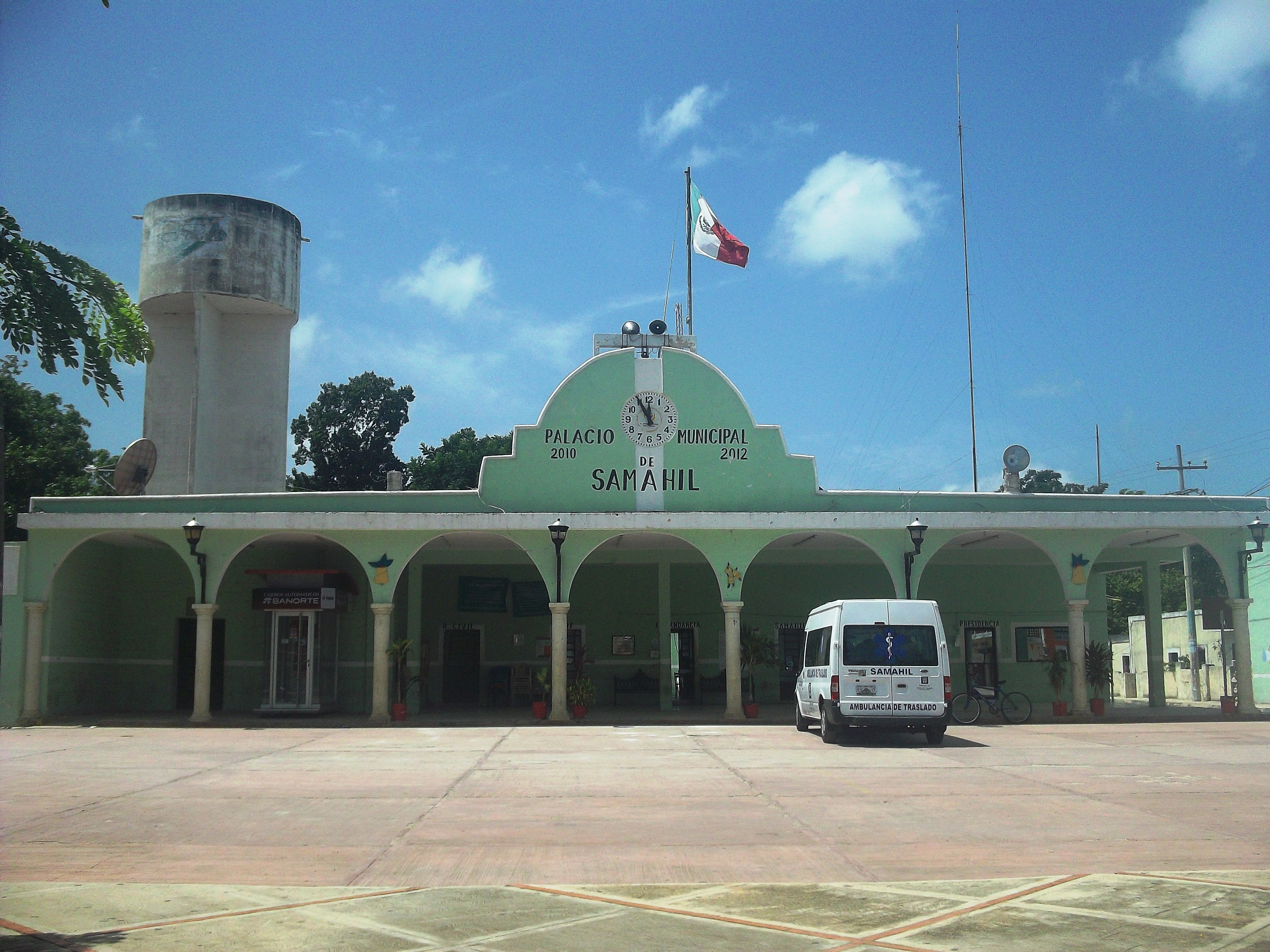
- Municipal Palace

- Coat of arms

- Region 1 Poniente #063

- Location of the Municipality in Mexico
- Coordinates: 20°53′09″N 89°53′22″W
- Country: Mexico
- State: Yucatán
- Mexico Ind.: 1821
- Yucatán Est.: 1824

Government
  - Type: 2012–2015
  - Municipal President: Samuel Mayen Poot

Area
  - Total: 185.22 km^{2} (71.51 sq mi)
- Elevation: 10 m (33 ft)

Population (2010)
  - Total: 5,008
  - Density: 27.04/km^{2} (70.03/sq mi)
  - Demonym: Umanense
- Time zone: UTC-6 (Central Standard Time)
- INEGI Code: 063
- Major Airport: Merida (Manuel Crescencio Rejón) International Airport
- IATA Code: MID
- ICAO Code: MMMD

Samahil Municipality (Yucatec Maya: "place of the legume") is a municipality in the Mexican state of Yucatán containing 185.22 km^{2} of land and is located roughly 35 kilometres (22 mi) southwest of the city of Mérida.

== History ==
There is no accurate data on when the town was founded, but it was a settlement before the conquest and was located in the chieftainship of Ak Canul. After colonization, the area became part of the encomienda system with various encomenderos. The first was Rodrigo Alvarez in 1549 and later, José Solís Osorio in 1704.

Yucatán declared its independence from the Spanish Crown in 1821 and in 1825 the area was assigned to the Lower Camino Real under the Hunucma Municipality. In 1918 the area was confirmed as its own municipality.

== Governance ==
The municipal president is elected for a three-year term. The town council has four councilpersons, who serve as Secretary and councilors of public lighting, heritage and patrimony, cemeteries and markets.

The Municipal Council administers the business of the municipality. It is responsible for budgeting and expenditures and producing all required reports for all branches of the municipal administration. Annually it determines educational standards for schools.

The Police Commissioners ensure public order and safety. They are tasked with enforcing regulations, distributing materials and administering rulings of general compliance issued by the council.

== Communities ==
The head of the municipality is Samahil, Yucatán. The municipality has 13 other populated places including Dzit, Katua, Kuchel, Poot, San Antonio Tedzidz and Xkapul. The significant populations are shown below:

| Community | Population |
|---|---|
| Entire Municipality (2010) | 5,008 |
| Kuchel | 837 in 2005 |
| Samahil | 2704 in 2005 |
| San Antonio Tedzidz | 1219 in 2005 |

== Local festivals ==
Every year on 9 June the town holds a celebration for their patron, San Pedro Abad.

== Tourist attractions ==
- Former Convent of San Pedro, built in the colonial era
- Hacienda San Antonio Tedzidz
