= Suma Municipality =

Municipality in the Mexican state of Yucatán

Suma
- Municipality
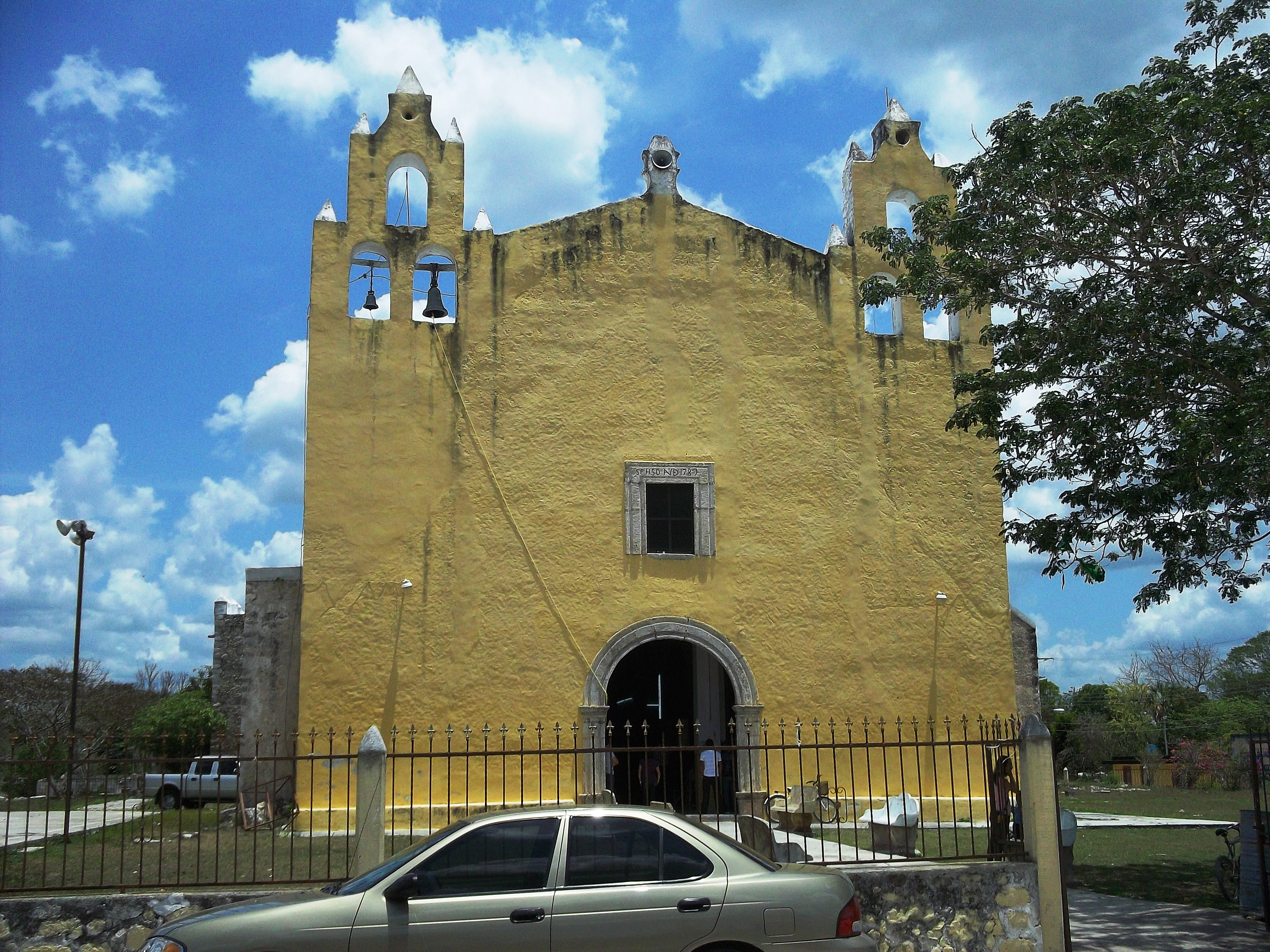
- Principal Church of Suma de Hidalgo, Yucatán

- Coat of arms

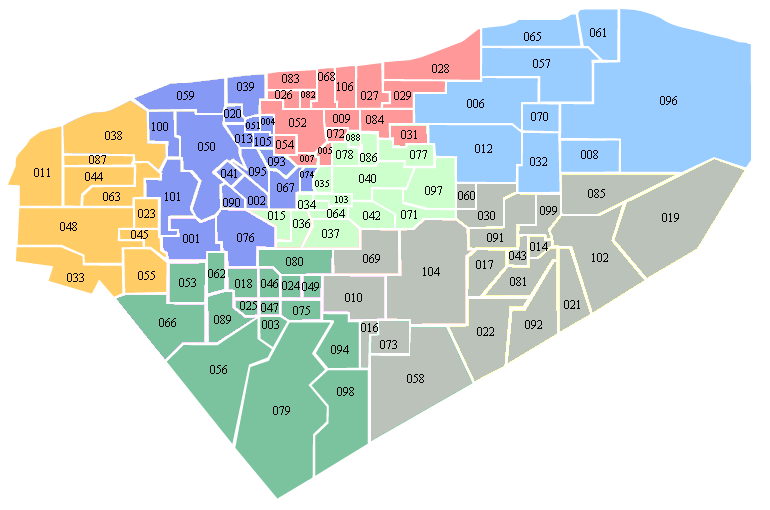
- Region 4 Litoral centro #072

- Location of the Municipality in Mexico
- Coordinates: 21°05′10″N 89°08′55″W
- Country: Mexico
- State: Yucatán

Government
  - Type: 2012–2015
  - Municipal President: José De La Cruz Pacheco Bazán

Area
  - Total: 39.60 km^{2} (15.29 sq mi)
- Elevation: 3 m (9.8 ft)

Population (2010)
  - Total: 1,876
- Time zone: UTC-6 (Central Standard Time)
- INEGI Code: 072
- Major Airport: Merida (Manuel Crescencio Rejón) International Airport
- IATA Code: MID
- ICAO Code: MMMD

Suma Municipality (In the Yucatec Maya Language: "water at the suum plant") is a municipality in the Mexican state of Yucatán containing 39.60 square kilometres (15.29 sq mi) of land and located roughly 55 kilometres (34 mi) northeast of the city of Mérida.

== History ==
It is unknown which chieftainship the area was under prior to the arrival of the Spanish. After the conquest the area became part of the encomienda system. The first encomendero was Papacal [sic] Juárez (1549) who died and the property was inherited by his heir, who was a minor in 1565. In 1607 the estate passed to Juan de Céspedes y Figueroa, was acquired by Francisco Polanco Tamayo Pacheco in 1626, and by 1666 had gone to Isabell de Padilla and Benita de Sotomayor. In 1700 the encomendero was Baltazar Alfonso Enriquez Amaya, who oversaw 242 Indians and in 1721 the encomendera was Juana Delgado y la Piedra, who was responsible for 321 indigenous inhabitants.

Yucatán declared its independence from the Spanish Crown in 1821 and in 1825, the area was assigned to the coastal region with its headquarters in Izamal Municipality. In 1921 it was designated as its own municipality.

In 1847, at the village plaza of Suma, Mayan people of the town had assembled and resolved to take part in the "War of the Castes" which was a revolutionary bloody act undertaken by the Maya Indians to fight the Creoles and Spanish colonialists. To mark this occasion the town’s people, men and women of all walks of life, assembled again at the plaza on the same date in 1923 (a few weeks before May Day celebrations) in front of the Municipal building to greet the Governor and his official entourage. On this occasion the "solemn ejidos act" was signed restoring land to the "dispossessed people" which had been tilled by their ancestors for several hundred years; transfer deeds were checked and granted to the heirs of the rightful heirs of the lands.

== Governance ==
The municipal president is elected for a three-year term. The town council has four councilpersons, who serve as Secretary and councilors of security, ecology and public image.

The Municipal Council administers the business of the municipality. It is responsible for budgeting and expenditures and producing all required reports for all branches of the municipal administration. Annually it determines educational standards for schools.

The Police Commissioners ensure public order and safety. They are tasked with enforcing regulations, distributing materials and administering rulings of general compliance issued by the council.

== Communities ==
The head of the municipality is Suma de Hidalgo, Yucatán. The other populated areas of the municipality include Hacienda Dzonat, Kininche, and San Nicolas. The significant populations are shown below:

Community	Population
Entire Municipality (2010)	1,876
San Nicolas	22 in 2005
Suma	1743 in 2005

== Economy ==
Henequeen production is central to Yucatan and there are processing plants located at strategic locations close to the estates and the residential areas of the workforce. One such plant has been established by the government about a km away from Suma.

== Local festivals ==
Every year on 22 June is the celebration for the town's patron, St. Bartholomew.

== Tourist attractions ==
- Church of St. Bartholomew, built in the colonial era
- Hacienda San Nicolás
- Hacienda Dzonat

== Bibliography ==
- Chardon, Roland Emanuel Paul (1961). Geographic Aspects of Plantation Agriculture in Yucatan. National Academies. p. 166. NAP:11330.
- Reed, Alma M.; Schuessler, Michael K. (1 April 2007). Peregrina: Love and Death in Mexico. University of Texas Press. ISBN 978-0-292-70239-4.
