= Tahmek Municipality =

Municipality in the Mexican state of Yucatán

Tahmek
- Municipality
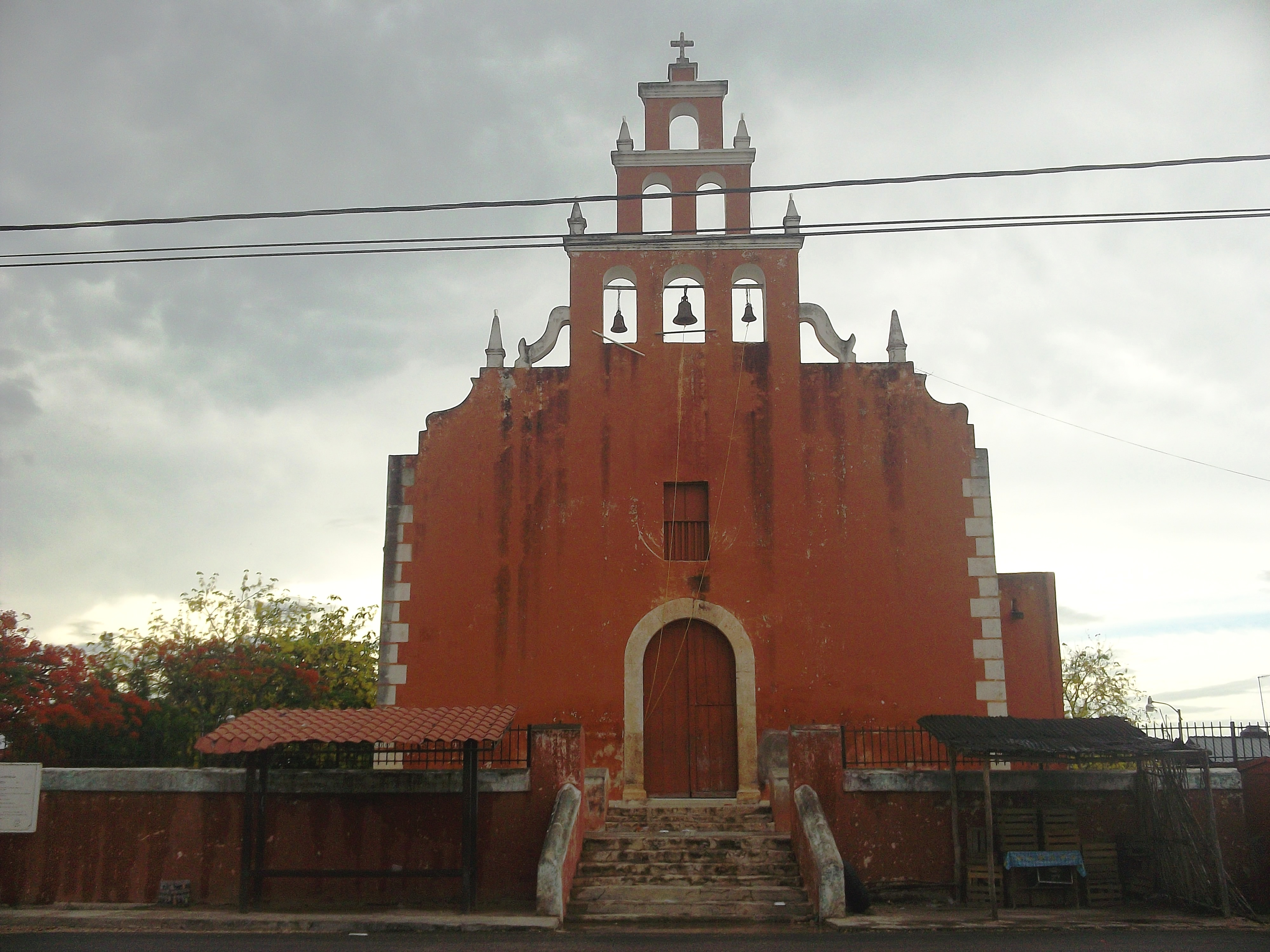
- Principal Church of Tahmek, Yucatán

- Region 2 Noroeste #074

- Location of the Municipality in Mexico
- Coordinates: 20°52′27″N 89°15′22″W
- Country: Mexico
- State: Yucatán

Government
  - Type: 2012–2015
  - Municipal President: Martha Patricia Silveira Puerto

Area
  - Total: 139.24 km^{2} (53.76 sq mi)
- Elevation: 14 m (46 ft)

Population (2010)
  - Total: 3,609
- Time zone: UTC-6 (Central Standard Time)
- INEGI Code: 009
- Major Airport: Merida (Manuel Crescencio Rejón) International Airport
- IATA Code: MID
- ICAO Code: MMMD

Tahmek Municipality (In the Yucatec Maya Language: “refuse to embrace”) is a municipality in the Mexican state of Yucatán containing 139.24 km^{2} of land and located roughly 39 km southeast of the city of Mérida.

== History ==
During pre-Hispanic times, the area was part of the chieftainship of Hocabá. The chief was Nacu-Iut, when the Spanish arrived. After the conquest the area became part of the encomienda system and Isabel de Lara was one of the first encomenderas of Tahmek. Upon her death, her estates were divided up with half of Tahmek going with parts of Hocaba and Timucuy to D. Pedro Fernández de Castro. Fernández de Castro's half was merged with the estate of Tixkunchel. The remainder of her estate remained as Tahmek. In 1597 Juan de Magaña Pacheco was the encomendero. A later encomendero was Manuel Carrillo de Albornoz.

Yucatán declared its independence from the Spanish Crown in 1821 and in 1825, the area was assigned to the Beneficios Bajos region with its headquarters in Sotuta, and later passed to the Izamal Municipality. In 1918, it became head of its own municipality.

== Governance ==
The municipal president is elected for a three-year term. The town council has four councilpersons, who serve as Secretary and councilors of Public works, ecology and public security.

The Municipal Council administers the business of the municipality. It is responsible for budgeting and expenditures and producing all required reports for all branches of the municipal administration. Annually it determines educational standards for schools.

The Police Commissioners ensure public order and safety. They are tasked with enforcing regulations, distributing materials and administering rulings of general compliance issued by the council.

== Communities ==
The head of the municipality is Tahmek, Yucatán. The other populated areas are the Haciendas Muna and Xtabay. The significant populations are shown below:

Community	Population
Entire Municipality (2010)	3,609
Tahmek	3383 in 2005
Xtabay	101 in 2005

== Local festivals ==
Every year on 18 April a fiesta is held for St. Peter the Apostle and from 7 to 12 August celebrations in honor of San Lorenzo, the town's patron saint, are held.

== Tourist attractions ==
- Church of San Lorenzo
- archeological sites Sitpach and Xemaa
- Hacienda Xtabay
