= Ucú Municipality =

Municipality in the Mexican state of Yucatán

Ucú
- Municipality
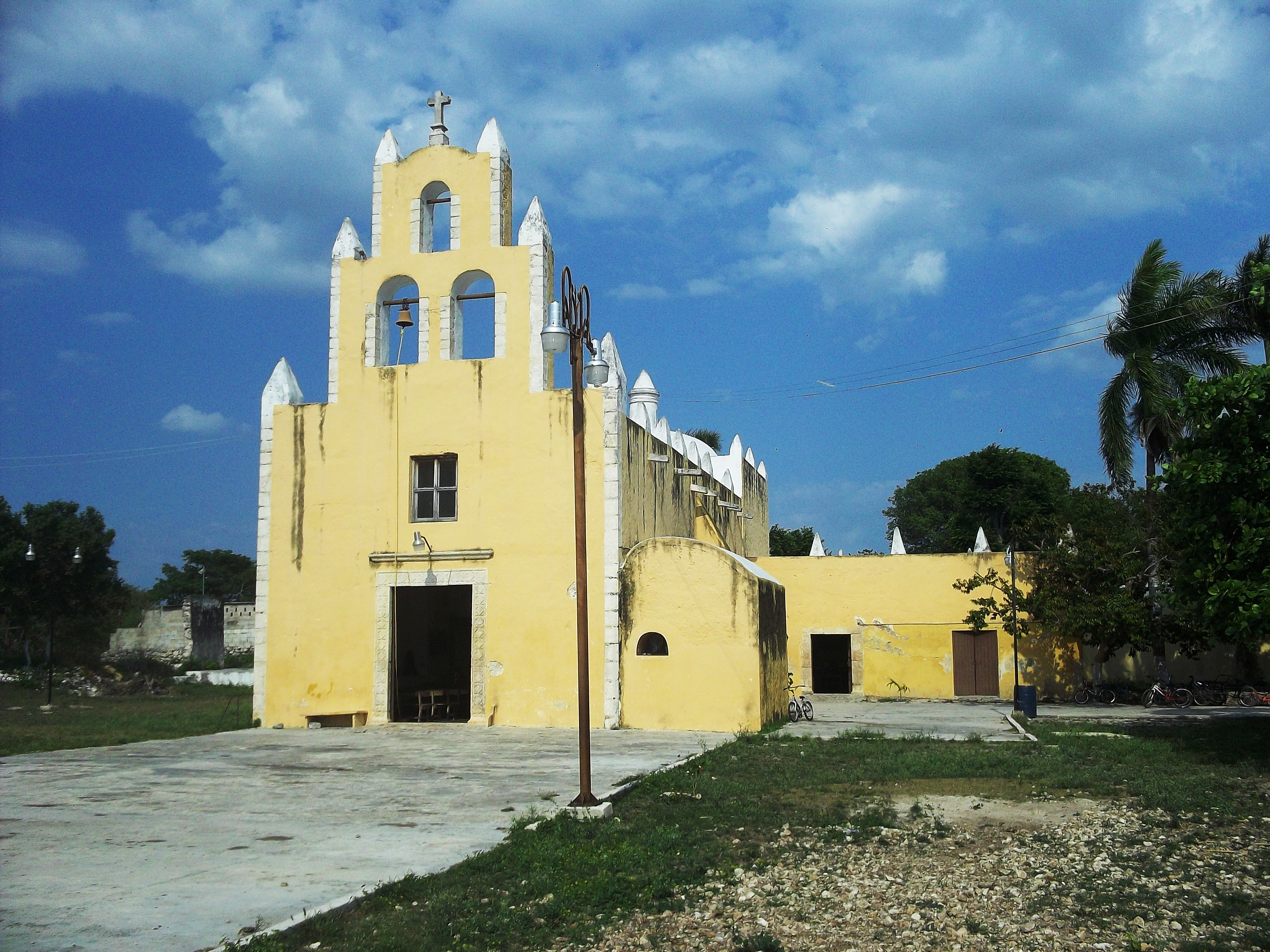
- Church of Ucú, Yucatán

- Coat of arms

- Region 2 Noroeste #100

- Location of the Municipality in Mexico
- Coordinates: 21°01′51″N 89°44′49″W
- Country: Mexico
- State: Yucatán

Government
  - Type: 2012–2015
  - Municipal President: Jorge Luis Magaña Tun

Area
  - Total: 192.89 km^{2} (74.48 sq mi)
- Elevation: 7 m (23 ft)

Population (2010)
  - Total: 3,469
- Time zone: UTC-6 (Central Standard Time)
- INEGI Code: 009
- Major Airport: Merida (Manuel Crescencio Rejón) International Airport
- IATA Code: MID
- ICAO Code: MMMD

Ucú Municipality (In the Yucatec Maya Language: “place of the seven moons”) is a municipality in the Mexican state of Yucatán containing 192.89 km^{2} of land and located roughly 16 km northwest of the city of Mérida.

== History ==
There is no accurate data on when the town was founded, though it existed before the conquest and in antiquity belonged to the chieftainship of Ah Canul. At colonization, Ucú became part of the encomienda system with Francisca Rodríguez Vicario recorded as the encomendero.

In 1821, Yucatán was declared independent of the Spanish Crown. In 1825 the area was part of the Mérida region, and later it passed to the region of Hunucma. Ucú was designated as its own municipality in 1925.

== Governance ==
The municipal president is elected for a term of three years. The president appoints four Councilpersons to serve on the board for three year terms, as the Secretary and councilors who oversee public works, street lighting, nomenclature, markets, cemeteries, and commissaries.

== Communities ==
The head of the municipality is Ucú, Yucatán. The other important town is Yaxché de Peón and there are three small haciendas: Gobonyá, Sey, and Siach. The major population areas are shown below:

Community	Population
Entire Municipality (2010)	3,469
Ucú	2360 in 2005
Yaxché de Peón	691 in 2005

== Local festivals ==
Every year on 8 September the feast the Nativity of the Virgin Mary is celebrated.

== Tourist attractions ==
- Archaeological site at Ucú
- Archaeological site at Tisikul
- Hacienda Yaxché de Peón
