= Dzán Municipality =

Municipality in the Mexican state of Yucatán

Dzán
- Municipality
- Region 7 Sur #025

- Location of the Municipality in Mexico
- Coordinates: 20°25′42″N 89°18′04″W
- Country: Mexico
- State: Yucatán
- Mexico Ind.: 1821
- Yucatán Est.: 1824

Government
  - Type: 2018–2021
  - Municipal President: Luis Manuel Novelo Ku

Area
  - Total: 61.31 km^{2} (23.67 sq mi)
- Elevation: 17 m (56 ft)

Population (2010)
  - Total: 4,941
  - Density: 80.59/km^{2} (208.7/sq mi)
  - Demonym: Dzanense
- Time zone: UTC-6 (Central Standard Time)
- INEGI Code: 025
- Major Airport: Merida (Manuel Crescencio Rejón) International Airport
- IATA Code: MID
- ICAO Code: MMMD

Dzán Municipality (In the Yucatec Maya Language: "plunge or sunken") is a municipality in the Mexican state of Yucatán containing 61.31 km^{2} of land and is located roughly 95 km south of the city of Mérida.

== History ==
The exact founding date of the town is unknown, although it predates the Spanish conquest. During the colonial period, Dzán was incorporated into the encomienda system. The regions encompassing Dzán and Muna Municipality were combined at the time of encomienda. The first encomendero was Castilla in 1549, followed by Alonso Rosado and Diego Rosado. By 1607, the encomienda was under the control of Pedro Rosado.

Yucatán declared independence from the Spanish Crown in 1821, and in 1825, the area was allocated to the high sierra partition of Ticul Municipality. It was established as an independent municipality in 1932.

== Governance ==
The municipal president is elected for a three-year term. The town council has five councilpersons, who serve as Secretary and councilors of public works, public security, cemeteries and nomenclature.

== Communities ==
The head of the municipality is Dzán, Yucatán. There are 4 populated areas of the municipality. The significant populations are shown below:

Community	Population
Entire Municipality (2010)	4,941
Dzán	4587 in 2005

== Local festivals ==
Every year from 6 to 14 September is the Festival of Cristo de San Román.

== Tourist attractions ==
- Church of Santiago Apóstol, built in the seventeenth century
- Chapel of the Holy Cross
- Archaeological sites in the area around Dzán
