= Tahdziú Municipality =

Municipality in the Mexican state of Yucatán

Tahdziú
- Municipality
- Region 6 Oriente #073

- Location of the Municipality in Mexico
- Coordinates: 20°12′08″N 88°56′35″W
- Country: Mexico
- State: Yucatán
- Mexico Ind.: 1821
- Yucatán Est.: 1824

Government
  - Type: 2012–2015
  - Municipal President: Victoria Yaa Medina

Area
  - Total: 53.65 km^{2} (20.71 sq mi)
- Elevation: 32 m (105 ft)

Population (2010)
  - Total: 4,447
  - Density: 82.89/km^{2} (214.7/sq mi)
  - Demonym: Umanense
- Time zone: UTC-6 (Central Standard Time)
- INEGI Code: 073
- Major Airport: Merida (Manuel Crescencio Rejón) International Airport
- IATA Code: MID
- ICAO Code: MMMD

Tahdziú Municipality (Yucatec Maya: "place of the strong Tziu bird") is a municipality in the Mexican state of Yucatán containing (53.65 km^{2}) of land and is located roughly 145 kilometres (90 mi) southeast of the city of Mérida.

== History ==
There is no accurate data on when the town was founded, but it was a settlement before the conquest. After colonization, the area became part of the encomienda system with Juan Magaña Arroyo and Juan de Argaiz y Cienfuegos, serving as encomenderos over 360 indigenous people.

Yucatán declared its independence from the Spanish Crown in 1821, and in 1825 the area was assigned to the High Sierra partition with headquarters in Tekax Municipality. In 1867, it was moved to the jurisdiction of the Peto Municipality before being confirmed as its own municipality in 1988.

== Governance ==
The municipal president is elected for a three-year term. The town council has four councilpersons, who serve as Secretary and councilors of public security; cleanliness, hygiene and public sanitation; public monuments; and nomenclature.

The Municipal Council administers the business of the municipality. It is responsible for budgeting and expenditures and producing all required reports for all branches of the municipal administration. Annually it determines educational standards for schools.

The Police Commissioners ensure public order and safety. They are tasked with enforcing regulations, distributing materials and administering rulings of general compliance issued by the council.

== Communities ==
The head of the municipality is Tahdziú, Yucatán. The municipality has 30 populated places besides the seat including Mocte, San Isidro Uno, Santa Margarita and Timul. The significant populations are shown below:

Community	Population
Entire Municipality (2010)	4,447
Tahdziú	3242 in 2005
Timul	451 in 2005

== Local festivals ==
Every year on 18 April there is a feast to celebrate Saint Peter the Apostle and from 7 to 12 August, the town celebrates a festival for its patron, San Lorenzo.

== Tourist attractions ==
- Church of San Lorenzo, built during the seventeenth century
- archeological site at Sitpach
- archeological site at Xemas
- Hacienda Xtabay
