= Timucuy Municipality =

Municipality in the Mexican state of Yucatán

Timucuy
- Municipality
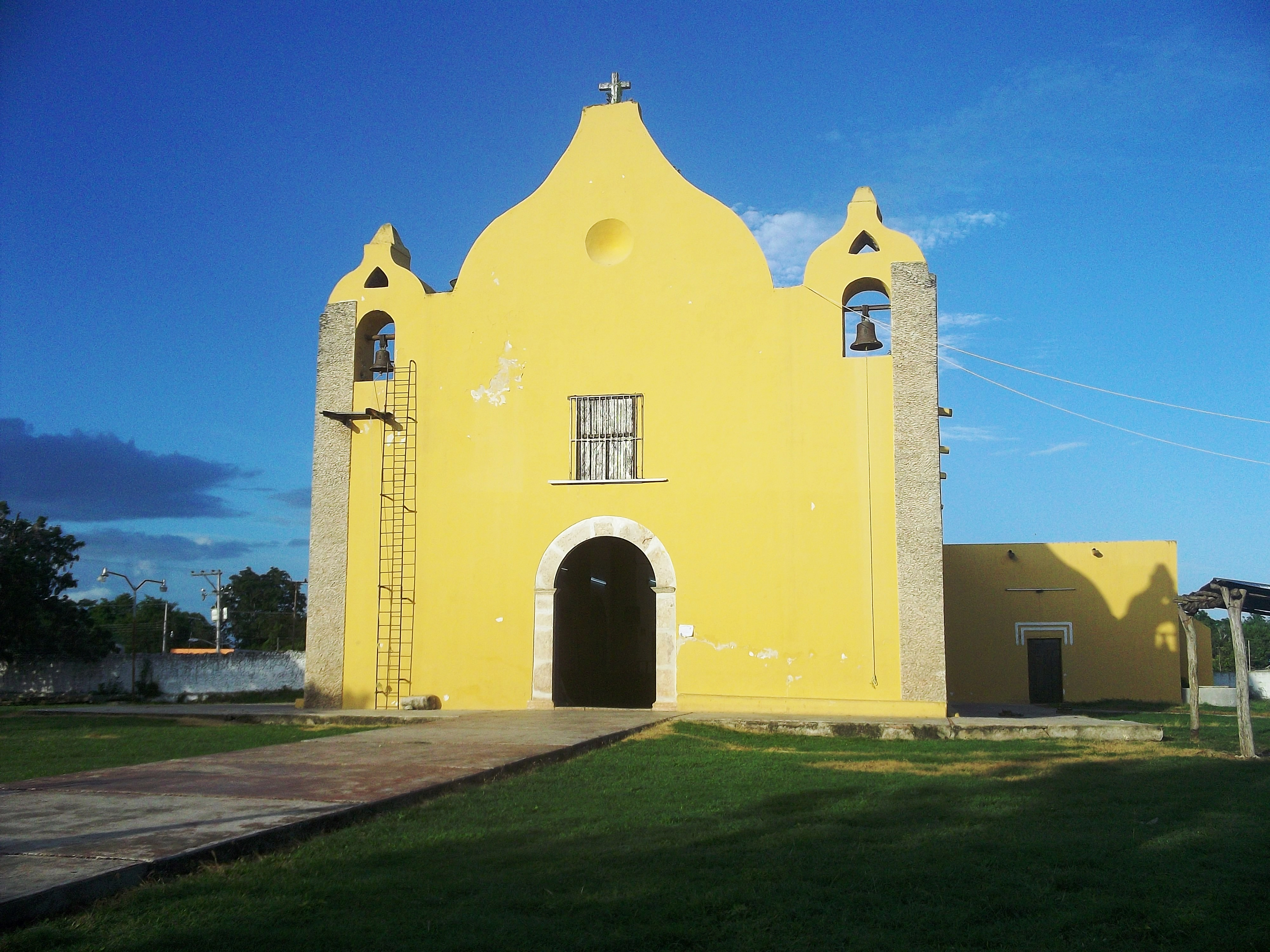
- Church at Timucuy, Yucatán

- Region 2 Noroeste #090

- Location of the Municipality in Mexico
- Coordinates: 21°09′08″N 89°28′56″W
- Country: Mexico
- State: Yucatán

Government
  - Type: 2012–2015
  - Municipal President: Carlos Eutimio Chan May

Area
  - Total: 63.15 km^{2} (24.38 sq mi)
- Elevation: 14 m (46 ft)

Population (2010)
  - Total: 6,833
- Time zone: UTC-6 (Central Standard Time)
- INEGI Code: 009
- Major Airport: Merida (Manuel Crescencio Rejón) International Airport
- IATA Code: MID
- ICAO Code: MMMD

Timucuy Municipality (In the Yucatec Maya Language: “place of the dove (divine hen)”) is a municipality in the Mexican state of Yucatán containing 63.15 km^{2} of land and located roughly 25 km southeast of the city of Mérida.

== History ==
In ancient times, the area was part of the chieftainship of Chakan until the conquest. At colonization, Timucuy became part of the encomienda system, with a series of encomenderos including Pedro Álvarez in 1549, Gaspar Juárez de Ávila in 1565 and Gertrudis Marín in 1724.

In 1821, Yucatán was declared independent of the Spanish Crown. In 1840, Timucuy was joined with the region of Tecoh. On 24 July 1867, Timucuy was established as a town within the jurisdiction of Acanceh Municipality. In 1988, it was designated as head of its own municipality.

== Governance ==
The municipal president is elected for a term of three years. The president appoints Councilpersons to serve on the board for three year terms, as the Secretary and councilors of street lighting, ecology and parks and public gardens.

== Communities ==
The head of the municipality is Timucuy, Yucatán. Other populated communities in Timucuy are Flor de Lluvia, Ixtlé, Jalapa, San Antonio, Siibay Yunkú, Subincancab, and Tekit de Regil. The largest populated areas are shown below:

Community	Population
Entire Municipality (2010)	6,833
Subincancab	901 in 2005
Tekik de Regil	1847 in 2005
Timucuy	3576 in 2005

== Local festivals ==
Every year from the 10 to 15 of April is a fair featuring regional dancing.

== Tourist attractions ==
- Church of San Gaspar
- Hacienda Subinkancab
- Hacienda Tekik de Regil
