= Kinchil Municipality =

Municipality in the Mexican state of Yucatán

Kinchil
- Municipality
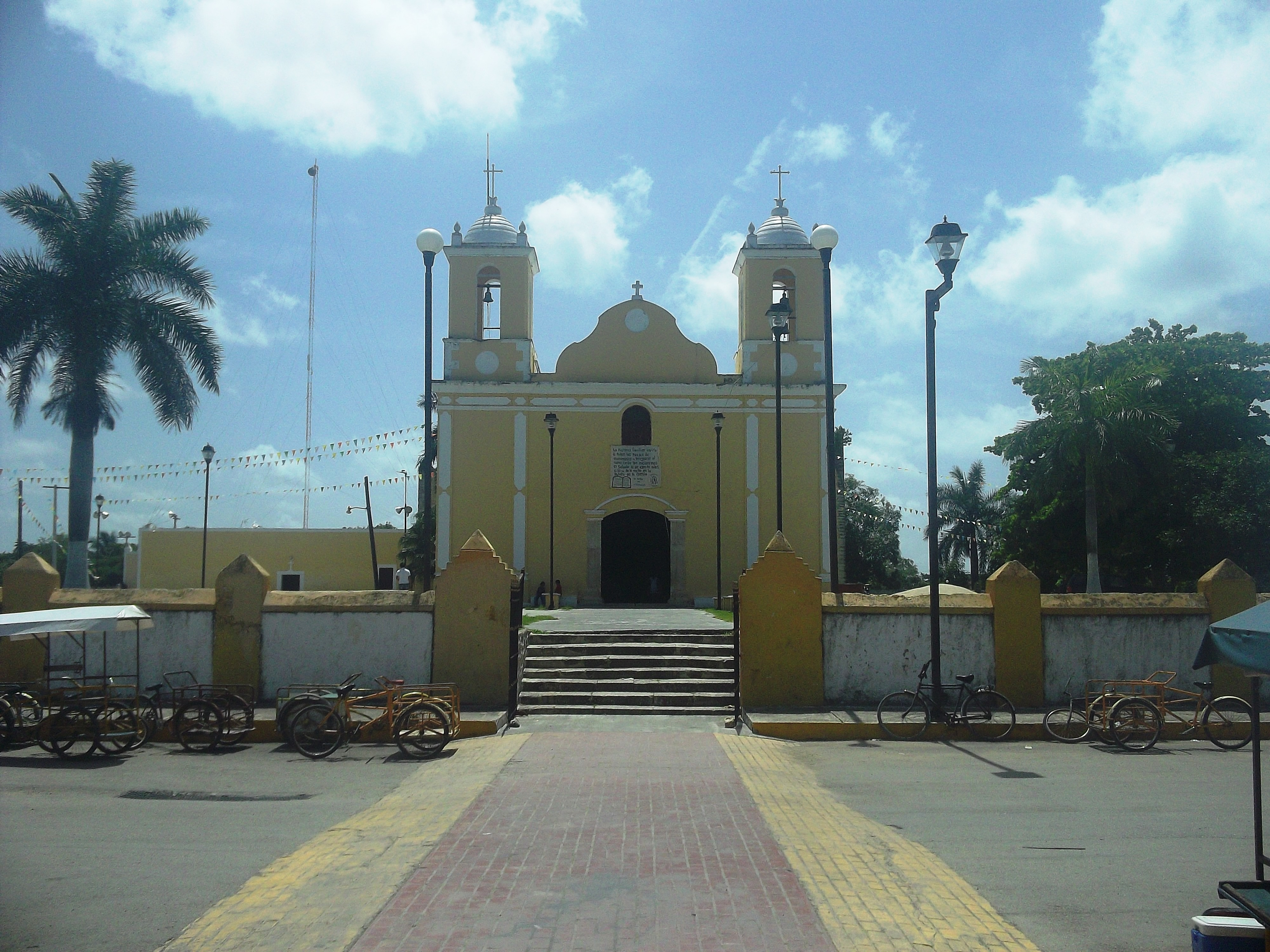
- Principal Church of Kinchil, Yucatán

- Region 1 Poniente #044

- Location of the Municipality in Mexico
- Coordinates: 20°54′58″N 89°56′49″W
- Country: Mexico
- State: Yucatán
- Mexico Ind.: 1821
- Yucatán Est.: 1824

Government
  - Type: 2012–2015
  - Municipal President: Marco Antonio Poot Aguallo

Area
  - Total: 160.95 km^{2} (62.14 sq mi)
- Elevation: 8 m (26 ft)

Population (2010)
  - Total: 6,571
  - Density: 40.83/km^{2} (105.7/sq mi)
  - Demonym: Umanense
- Time zone: UTC-6 (Central Standard Time)
- INEGI Code: 044
- Major Airport: Merida (Manuel Crescencio Rejón) International Airport
- IATA Code: MID
- ICAO Code: MMMD

Kinchil Municipality (Yucatec Maya: "Place of the god Kinich") is a municipality in the Mexican state of Yucatán containing 160.95 km^{2} of land and is located roughly 35 kilometres (22 mi) west of the city of Mérida.

== History ==
There is no accurate data on when the town was founded, but it was a settlement before the conquest and was located in the chieftainship of Ah Canul. After colonization, the area became part of the encomienda system with various encomenderos, with Pedro Castellanos and Petrona Magaña Dorantes serving at different times.

Yucatán declared its independence from the Spanish Crown in 1821 and in 1825 the area was assigned to the Hunucma Municipality. In 1900 the area became its own municipality.

== Governance ==
The municipal president is elected for a three-year term. The town council has four councilpersons, who serve as Secretary and councilors of heritage and monuments; public works and public cleanliness; roads; and public buildings.

The Municipal Council administers the business of the municipality. It is responsible for budgeting and expenditures and producing all required reports for all branches of the municipal administration. Annually it determines educational standards for schools.

The Police Commissioners ensure public order and safety. They are tasked with enforcing regulations, distributing materials and administering rulings of general compliance issued by the council.

== Communities ==
The head of the municipality is Kinchil, Yucatán. The municipality has 6 populated places besides the seat including Bella Flor and Tamchén. The significant populations are shown below:

Community	Population
Entire Municipality (2010)	6,571
Kinchil	5705 in 2005
Tamchén	259 in 2005

== Local festivals ==
Every year on 24 May the town celebrates the feast of its patron, Christ of the Blisters.

== Tourist attractions ==
- Church of Christ of the Blisters, built in the sixteenth century
- Hacienda Tamchén
