= Cantamayec Municipality =

Municipality in the Mexican state of Yucatán

Cantamayec
- Municipality
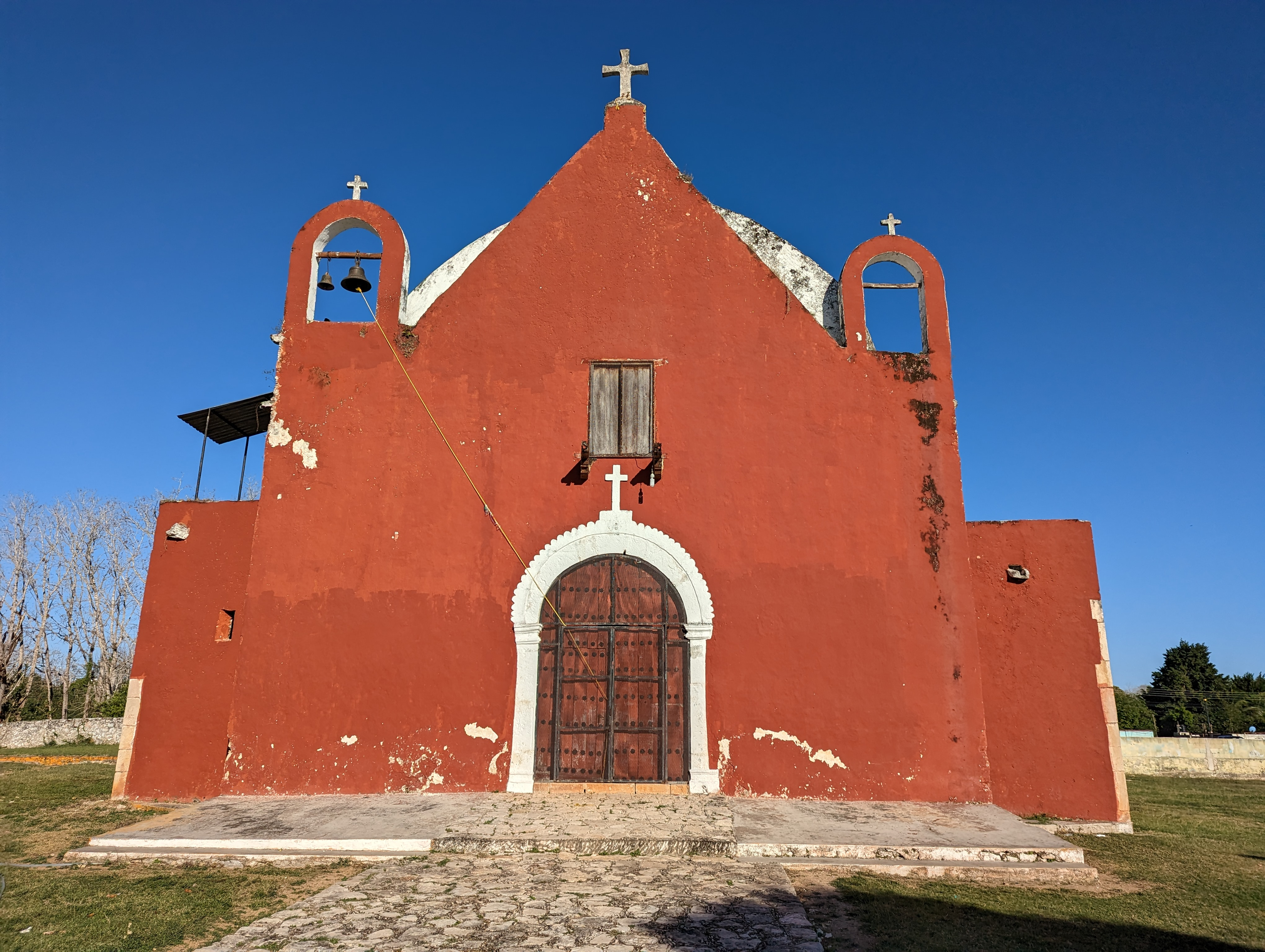
- Church of San Luis in Cantamayec

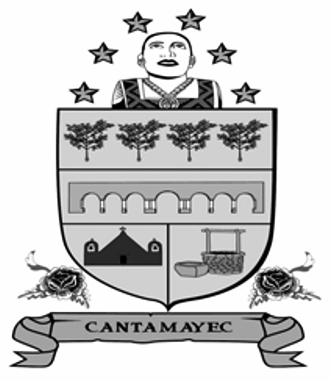
- Coat of arms

- Location of Cantamayec in Yucatán

- Location of Cantamayec in Mexico
- Coordinates: 20°28′03″N 89°04′48″W
- Country: Mexico
- State: Yucatán
- Established: 1917

Government
  - Type: 2012–2015
  - Municipal President: José Melchor Dzib Dzib

Area
  - Total: 502.02 km^{2} (193.83 sq mi)
- Elevation: 24 m (79 ft)

Population (2010)
  - Total: 2,407
  - Density: 4.795/km^{2} (12.42/sq mi)
- Time zone: UTC-6 (Central Standard Time)
- INEGI Code: 010
- Website: Official website

Cantamayec (In the Yucatec Maya language: Zuelania guidonia: "four tamay trees") is a municipality in the Mexican state of Yucatán. It covers an area of 502.02 km^{2} and is located roughly 110 km southeast of the city of Mérida.

== History ==
There is no accurate data on when the town was founded, though it existed before the conquest. At colonization, Cantamayec became part of the encomienda system with the first recorded encomendero being Gonzalo Méndez in 1549. It passed to Gonzalo Méndez de Sandoval in 1607, to Pedro de Loaysa in 1625 and then to Manuel Carrillo de Albornoz in 1648.

Yucatán declared its independence from the Spanish Crown in 1821, and in 1825 the area was assigned to the lower partition of Sotuta Municipality. In 1917, it was designated as its own municipality.

== Governance ==
The municipal president is elected for a three-year term. The town council has four councilpersons, who serve as Secretary and councilors of public works, parks and gardens, nomenclature and public monuments.

== Communities ==
The head of the municipality is Cantamayec, Yucatán. There are 24 populated areas of the municipality. The most notable, after the seat, include Actún-May, Chác, Chac-Motul, Chacxúl, Chalanté, Chichican, Chimay, Cholul, Dolores, Dzán, Dzidzilché, Jesús Man, Kambul, Kojobchaká, Kulkabapop, Múch, Nenelá, Nicté, Revolución, San Carlos, San Isidro, San José Xikó, San Juan, San Martín, San Pedro, Santa Candelaria, Sodzil, Talek, Tixcacal Pérez, Trinidad, Yokdzonot and Yuyumal. The significant populations are shown below:

Community	Population
Entire Municipality (2010)	2,407
Cantamayec	1608 in 2005
Cholul	395 in 2005
Nenelá	223 in 2005

== Local festivals ==
Every year from 25 to 28 March the traditional town feast is celebrated.

== Tourist attractions ==
- Church of San Luis, built in the seventeenth century
- Church of San Miguel Arcángel, built in the eighteenth century
- Archaeological site at Ohican
- Cenote Cantamayec
- Cenote Che´n Chiik
- Cenote Cholul
- Cenote Hunchi Ich
- Cenote Jesús María
- Cenote Kocholá
