= Cuncunul Municipality =

Municipality in the Mexican state of Yucatán

Cuncunul
- Municipality
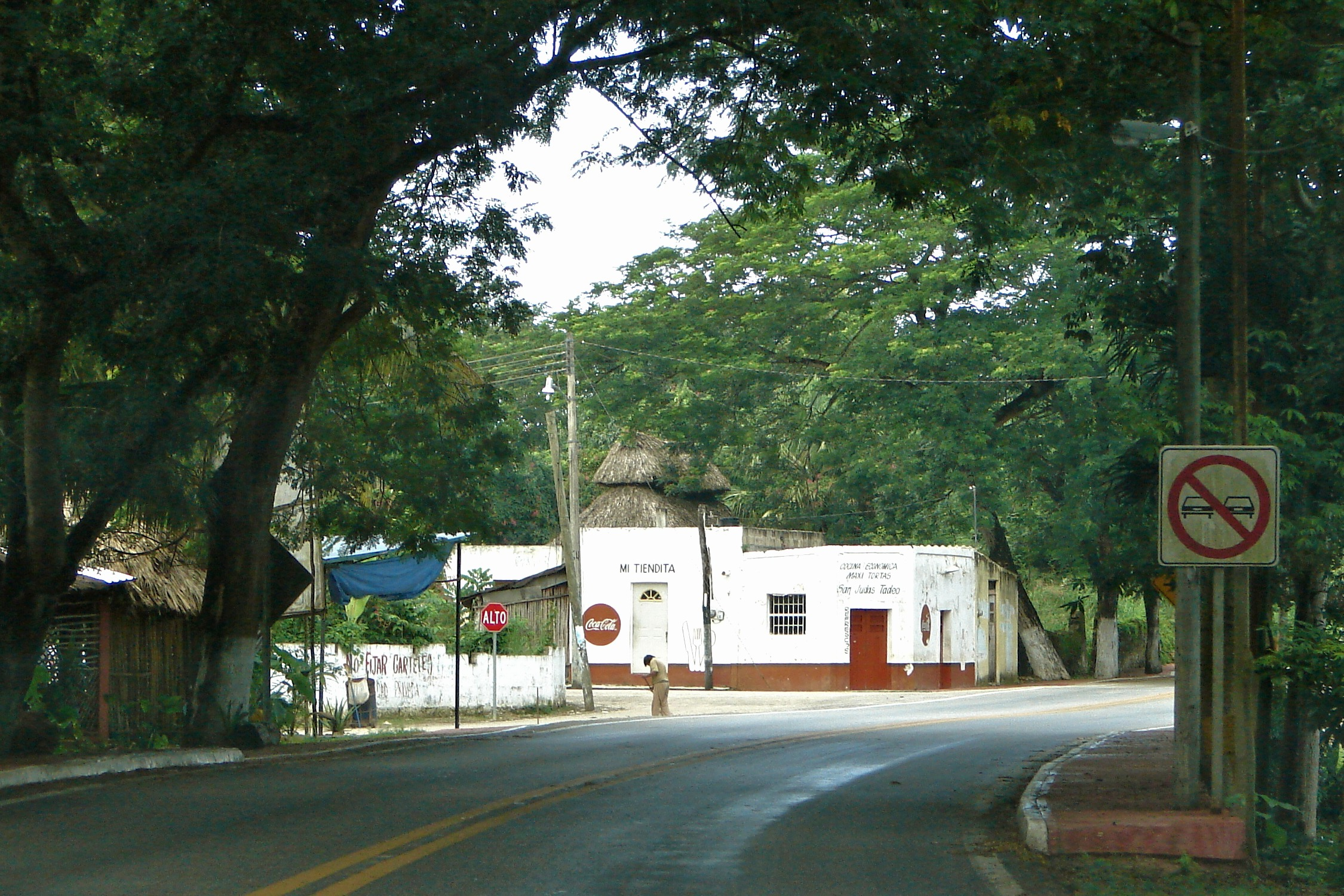

- Location of the municipality in Yucatán

- Location of the municipality in Mexico
- Coordinates: 20°38′29″N 88°17′46″W
- Country: Mexico
- State: Yucatán

Government
  - Type: 2012–2015
  - Municipal President: Reyes Melchor Suaste Gutiérrez

Area
  - Total: 315.52 km^{2} (121.82 sq mi)
- Elevation: 29 m (95 ft)

Population (2010)
  - Total: 1,595
- Time zone: UTC-6 (Central Standard Time)
- INEGI Code: 009
- Major Airport: Merida (Manuel Crescencio Rejón) International Airport
- IATA Code: MID
- ICAO Code: MMMD

Cuncunul Municipality (In the Yucatec Maya Language: “enchanted by others or vanity”) is a municipality in the Mexican state of Yucatán containing 315.52 km^{2} of land and located roughly 145 km east of the city of Mérida.

== History ==
Before the arrival of the Spanish, the area belonged to the chieftainship of Cupules. After the conquest the area became part of the encomienda system. What is now Cuncunul was a part of three different encomiendas. The first one, which covered 1/3 of the current municipality was established as an encomienda in 1549 for Francisco Manrique, Juan de Triana, and Juan de Cárdenas. In 1607 it passed to Francisco Mallén and Francisco Mallén de Rueda and in 1645 passed to Gaspar de Ayala Pacheco and Francisca Dorantes y Solís. In 1686 Pedro Pardo de Lagos was the encomendero.

The second part, which also covered 1/3 of the territory which is now Cuncunul was encompassed in an encomienda established in 1549 for Juan de Triana and Juan de Cárdenas. In 1579 Juan de Cárdenas II came into possession, and in 1607 the encomenderos were Fernando Parias Zapata and Francisco Zapata de Ayala. In 1648 Antonio Osorio Maldonado assumed the trust and was followed in 1668 by Diego de Solís Osorio and in 1688 by Francisco de Solís. The final 1/3 followed the succession of Chichen-Itza.

In the eighteenth century, the encomenderos were: Fernando Maldonado, Francisco Vázquez Carrasco and Andrés de Vales in 1700; Javier del Valle, Juan de Vergara and Bernardo Marcos Bermejo in 1722; and Juan Calderón and Beatriz Montiel y Cosgaya in 1785.

Yucatán declared its independence from the Spanish Crown in 1821 and in 1825, the area was assigned to the Valladolid region and was under the Uayma Municipality. It was designated as its own municipality in 1925.

== Governance ==
The municipal president is elected for a three-year term. The town council has four councilpersons, who serve as Secretary and councilors of education, public lighting, and police stations.

== Communities ==
The head of the municipality is Cuncunul, Yucatán. There are 14 populated places in the municipality with the most important being Chebalám, San Diego, San Francisco, San Jose and Xakabchén. The significant populations are shown below:

| Community | Population |
|---|---|
| Entire Municipality (2010) | 1,595 |
| Cuncunul | 1206 in 2005 |
| San Diego | 109 in 2005 |

== Local festivals ==
Every year on 24 June the town holds a celebration for its patron saint, San Juan Bautista.

== Tourist attractions ==
- Church of San Juan Bautista, built in the eighteenth century
- Archaeological site Bacche
- Archaeological site Cibbá
- Archaeological site Tomdzimín
- Archaeological site Tzacahuil
- Archaeological site Tzeleal
