= Kopomá Municipality =

Municipality in the Mexican state of Yucatán

Kopomá
- Municipality
- Region 1 Poniente #045

- Location of the Municipality in Mexico
- Coordinates: 20°38′52″N 89°53′55″W
- Country: Mexico
- State: Yucatán
- Mexico Ind.: 1821
- Yucatán Est.: 1824

Government
  - Type: 2012–2015
  - Municipal President: José Miguel Asencion Barboza Ek

Area
  - Total: 260.59 km^{2} (100.61 sq mi)
- Elevation: 11 m (36 ft)

Population (2010)
  - Total: 2,449
  - Density: 9.398/km^{2} (24.34/sq mi)
  - Demonym: Umanense
- Time zone: UTC-6 (Central Standard Time)
- INEGI Code: 045
- Major Airport: Merida (Manuel Crescencio Rejón) International Airport
- IATA Code: MID
- ICAO Code: MMMD

Kopomá Municipality (Yucatec Maya: "low or sunken water") is a municipality in the Mexican state of Yucatán containing 260.59 km^{2} of land and is located roughly 50 kilometres (31 mi) southwest of the city of Mérida.

== History ==
There is no accurate data on when the town was founded, but it was a settlement before the conquest and was located in the chieftainship of Ah Canul. After colonization, the area became part of the encomienda system with various encomenderos, such as in 1638 Francisco de Castillo Alvarado, Violante de Aragón y Guzmán, and Luis Francisco de Guardiola. It passed to Angela Menéndez de Porres in 1680, in 1691 to Casimiro J. Osorio Menéndez de Avilés, and to Josi Pordio in 1734.

Yucatán declared its independence from the Spanish Crown in 1821 and in 1825 the area was assigned to the Camino Real under the Maxcanú Municipality. In 1935 the area became its own municipality.

== Governance ==
The municipal president is elected for a three-year term. The town council has four councilpersons, who serve as Secretary and councilors of municipal heritage and urban planning; public works and public services; ecology and public security; and highway administration.

The Municipal Council administers the business of the municipality. It is responsible for budgeting and expenditures and producing all required reports for all branches of the municipal administration. Annually it determines educational standards for schools.

The Police Commissioners ensure public order and safety. They are tasked with enforcing regulations, distributing materials and administering rulings of general compliance issued by the council.

== Communities ==
The head of the municipality is Kopomá, Yucatán. The municipality has 3 other populated places including Concepción, San Bernardo and Santa Clara. The significant populations are shown below:

Community	Population
Entire Municipality (2010)	2,449
Kopomá	1819 in 2005
San Bernardo	398 in 2005

== Local festivals ==
Every year on 15 May the town celebrates the feast of its patron, San Isidro Labrador.

== Tourist attractions ==
- Church of Nuestra Señora de la Asunción, built in the colonial era
- Hacienda San Bernardo
- Cenote San Tito - this is a small cenote in someone's backyard with challenging vertical access and suitable for the more adventurous traveler. There is no infrastructure here at the time of this writing (2020) and the fee to descend into the refreshing waters is 30 pesos per person.
