= Sacalum Municipality =

Municipality in the Mexican state of Yucatán

Sacalum
- Municipality
- Region 7 Sur #062

- Location of the Municipality in Mexico
- Coordinates: 20°29′42″N 89°35′23″W
- Country: Mexico
- State: Yucatán
- Mexico Ind.: 1821
- Yucatán Est.: 1824

Government
  - Type: 2012–2015
  - Municipal President: Ana Maria Balam Medina

Area
  - Total: 205.66 km^{2} (79.41 sq mi)
- Elevation: 22 m (72 ft)

Population (2010)
  - Total: 4,589
  - Density: 22.31/km^{2} (57.79/sq mi)
  - Demonym: Umanense
- Time zone: UTC-6 (Central Standard Time)
- INEGI Code: 062
- Major Airport: Merida (Manuel Crescencio Rejón) International Airport
- IATA Code: MID
- ICAO Code: MMMD

Sacalum Municipality (In the Yucatec Maya Language: "white earth") is a municipality in the Mexican state of Yucatán containing 205.66 km^{2} of land and is located roughly 75 km south of the city of Mérida.

== History ==
There is no accurate data on when the town was founded, but during the conquest, a Franciscan order settled here. At colonization, Sacalum became part of the encomienda system with a series of encomendaros: Pedro Alvarez 1549, Francisco Pacheco 1579, Francisco de Solís 1607, Ignacio de Solís Osorio 1688, Lucas de Villamil y Vargas 1694.

Yucatán declared its independence from the Spanish Crown in 1821, and in 1825 the area was assigned to the low sierra partition of Mama Municipality. In 1867 it was transferred to the Ticul Municipality and confirmed as its own municipality in 1988.

== Governance ==
The municipal president is elected for a three-year term. The town council has four councilpersons, who serve as Secretary and councilors of public security and public lighting, image and ecology, potable water, cemeteries, and police commissaries.

The Municipal Council administers the business of the municipality. It is responsible for budgeting and expenditures and producing all required reports for all branches of the municipal administration. Annually it determines educational standards for schools.

The Police Commissioners ensure public order and safety. They are tasked with enforcing regulations, distributing materials and administering rulings of general compliance issued by the council.

== Communities ==
The head of the municipality is Sacalum, Yucatán. There are 9 populated areas of the municipality including: Chacá, Plan Chac, San Antonio Mulix, San Antonio Sodzil, San Esteban, San Raúl, Tepakán, Yohkat and Yunkú. The significant populations are shown below:

Community	Population
Entire Municipality (2010)	4,589
Plan Chac	267 in 2005
Sacalum	3399 in 2005
San Antonio Sodzil	384 in 2005
Yunkú	161 in 2005

== Local festivals ==
Every year on 3 May the town celebrates a festival in honor of the Holy Cross.

== Tourist attractions ==
- Church of Saint Anthony of Padua, built in the eighteenth century
- Hacienda San Antonio Sodzil
