= Mayapán Municipality =

Municipality in the Mexican state of Yucatán

Mayapán
- Municipality
- Region 7 Sur #049

- Location of the Municipality in Mexico
- Coordinates: 20°26′05″N 89°12′50″W
- Country: Mexico
- State: Yucatán
- Mexico Ind.: 1821
- Yucatán Est.: 1824

Government
  - Type: 2012–2015
  - Municipal President: Víctor Manuel Pool Cen

Area
  - Total: 103.47 km^{2} (39.95 sq mi)
- Elevation: 24 m (79 ft)

Population (2010)
  - Total: 3,269
  - Density: 31.59/km^{2} (81.83/sq mi)
  - Demonym: Umanense
- Time zone: UTC-6 (Central Standard Time)
- INEGI Code: 049
- Major Airport: Merida (Manuel Crescencio Rejón) International Airport
- IATA Code: MID
- ICAO Code: MMMD

Mayapán Municipality (In the Yucatec Maya Language: “flag of the Mayas") is a municipality in the Mexican state of Yucatán containing 103.47 km^{2} of land and is roughly 95 km southeast of the city of Mérida.

== History ==
The area that is now the Mayapán Municipality was previously part of the Chumayel Municipality. In 1935, it became the head of its own municipality.

== Governance ==
The municipal president is elected for a three-year term. The town council has four councilpersons, who serve as Secretary and councilors of health, public works, parks and gardens and public monuments.

The Municipal Council administers the business of the municipality. It is responsible for budgeting and expenditures and producing all required reports for all branches of the municipal administration. Annually it determines educational standards for schools.

The Police Commissioners ensure public order and safety. They are tasked with enforcing regulations, distributing materials and administering rulings of general compliance issued by the council.

== Communities ==
The head of the municipality is Mayapán, Yucatán. Besides the seat, the populated areas of the municipality include: Chacchibilá, Cumax, Cuzamá, Ibachil, San Antonio, San Antonio Techó, San Ignacio, San Juan, San Juan Uc, San Pedro, San Simón, Santa Isabel, Santa María González, Shichechén, Xcotzá and Yaxbacaltún. The significant populations are shown below:

Community	Population
Entire Municipality (2010)	3,269
Mayapán	2958 in 2005

== Local festivals ==
Every year on 18 March a celebration is held in honor of the Holy Christ of Love.
