= Tixméhuac Municipality =

Municipality in the Mexican state of Yucatán

Tixméhuac
- Municipality
- Region 7 Sur #094

- Location of the Municipality in Mexico
- Coordinates: 20°14′07″N 89°06′30″W
- Country: Mexico
- State: Yucatán
- Mexico Ind.: 1821
- Yucatán Est.: 1824

Government
  - Type: 2012–2015
  - Municipal President: Edilberto Rodriguez López

Area
  - Total: 251.65 km^{2} (97.16 sq mi)
- Elevation: 33 m (108 ft)

Population (2010)
  - Total: 4,746
  - Density: 18.86/km^{2} (48.85/sq mi)
  - Demonym: Umanense
- Time zone: UTC-6 (Central Standard Time)
- INEGI Code: 094
- Major Airport: Merida (Manuel Crescencio Rejón) International Airport
- IATA Code: MID
- ICAO Code: MMMD

Tixméhuac Municipality (Yucatec Maya: "Place of Xmeuac tribe") is a municipality in the Mexican state of Yucatán containing 251.65 km^{2} of land and is located roughly 110 kilometres (68 mi) southeast of the city of Mérida.

== History ==
There is no accurate data on when the town was founded, but it was a settlement before the conquest and under the chieftainship of Tutul Xiu. After colonization, the area became part of the encomienda system with various encomenderos, including: Juan Xiu, in 1557; Hernando Xiu, in 1565; and Pablo Cen, in 1579.

Yucatán declared its independence from the Spanish Crown in 1821, and in 1825 the area was assigned to the Tekax Municipality. In 1900 it becomes its own municipality.

== Governance ==
The municipal president is elected for a three-year term. The town council has four councilpersons, who serve as Secretary and councilors of public works, public services and cemeteries.

== Communities ==
The head of the municipality is Tixméhuac, Yucatán. The municipality has 25 populated places besides the seat including Chican, Chuchub, Dzutóh, Ebtún, Kimbilá, Sabacché, Sisbic and Xeo-pil. The significant populations are shown below:

| Community | Population |
|---|---|
| Entire Municipality (2010) | 4,746 |
| Chicán | 567 in 2005 |
| Dzutoh | 116 in 2005 |
| Kimbilá | 510 in 2005 |
| Sabacché | 572 in 2005 |
| Sisbic | 172 in 2005 |
| Tixméhuac | 2189 in 2005 |

== Local festivals ==
Every year on 19 September the town celebrates the feast of Saint Michael the Archangel.

== Tourist attractions ==
- Church of Saint Michael the Archangel, built during the eighteenth century
- archeological sites at Chucub, Kimbilá, Modzil and Nocas
