= Teya Municipality =

Municipality in the Mexican state of Yucatán

Teya
- Municipality
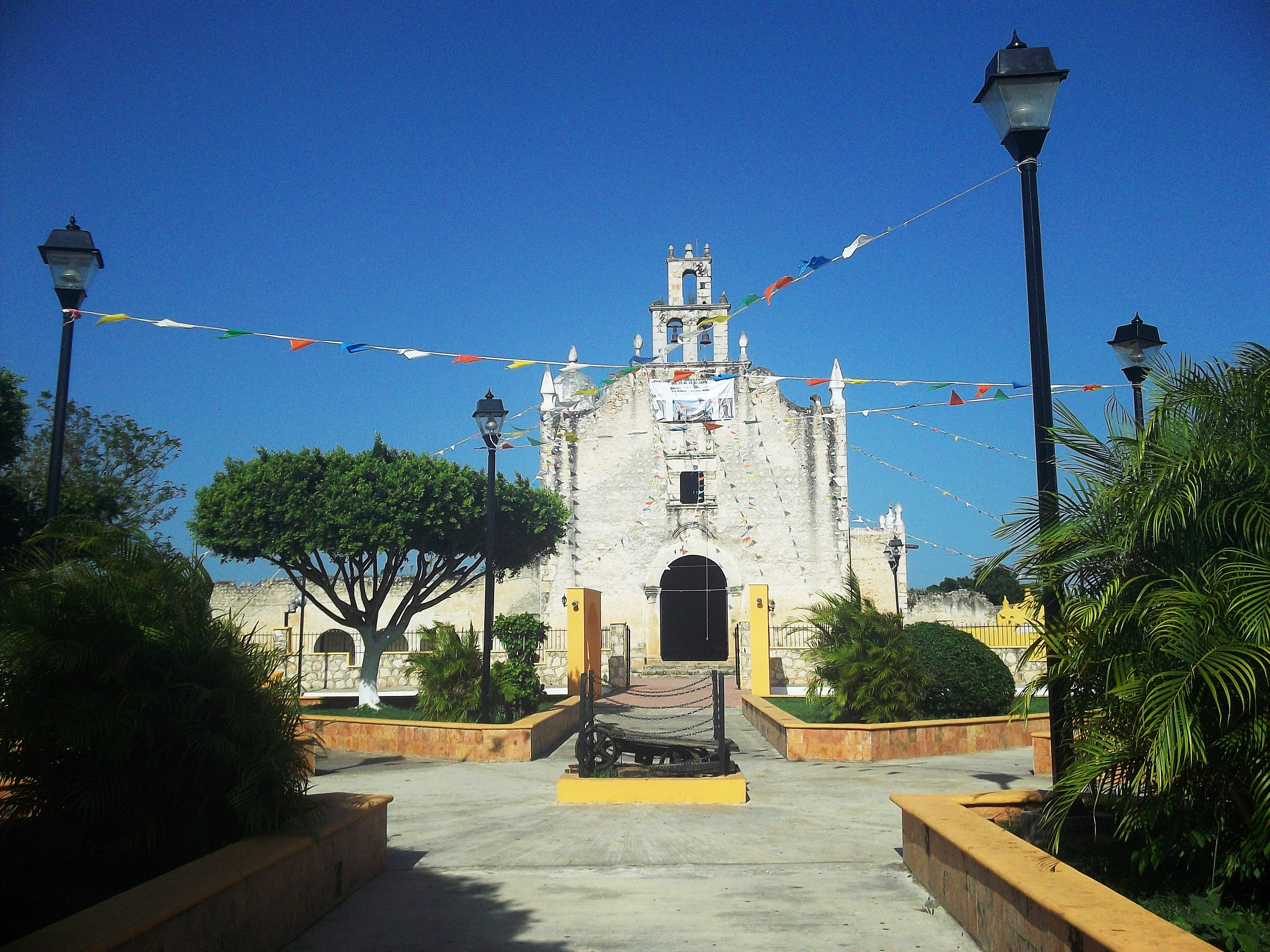
- Principal Church of Teya, Yucatán

- Region 3 Centro #088

- Location of the Municipality in Mexico
- Coordinates: 21°02′56″N 89°04′24″W
- Country: Mexico
- State: Yucatán

Government
  - Type: 2012–2015
  - Municipal President: Ramón Estrella Sanchez

Area
  - Total: 65.15 km^{2} (25.15 sq mi)
- Elevation: 9 m (30 ft)

Population (2010)
  - Total: 1,977
- Time zone: UTC-6 (Central Standard Time)
- INEGI Code: 009
- Major Airport: Merida (Manuel Crescencio Rejón) International Airport
- IATA Code: MID
- ICAO Code: MMMD

Teya Municipality (In the Yucatec Maya Language: “place of sapodilla”) is a municipality in the Mexican state of Yucatán containing 65.15 km^{2} of land and located roughly 65 km northeast of the city of Mérida.

== History ==
Before the arrival of the Spanish, the area belonged to the chieftainship of Ah Kin Chel. After the conquest the area became part of the encomienda system. The encomienda was established in 1565 for Alonso de Castro. By 1678, the encomendero was Anastasio Chacón de Azcorran and in 1690, the encomendera passed to María Barbosa e Ignacia Salazar.

Yucatán declared its independence from the Spanish Crown in 1821 and in 1825, the area was assigned to the Izamal Municipality. By April 1921 it was designated as its own municipality.

== Governance ==
The municipal president is elected for a three-year term. The town council has four councilpersons, who serve as Secretary and councilors of health, public services and public sanitation.

== Communities ==
The head of the municipality is Teya, Yucatán. The other populated areas of the municipality include Moni, El Paraje Carlos, Sánchez, and the Hacienda Santa Clara. The significant populations are shown below:

Community	Population
Entire Municipality (2010)	1,977
Teya	1966 in 2005

== Local festivals ==
Every year at the end of April there is a feast in honor of the town's patron saint, St. Barnabas, and on 11 June the town holds a fiesta for San Bernardino.

== Tourist attractions ==
- Church of St. Barnabas, built in the colonial era.
