= Chikindzonot Municipality =

Municipality in the Mexican state of Yucatán

Chikindzonot
- Municipality
- Region 6 Oriente #022

- Location of the Municipality in Mexico
- Coordinates: 20°20′00″N 88°29′11″W
- Country: Mexico
- State: Yucatán

Government
  - Type: 2012–2015
  - Municipal President: Catalino Chan Chuc

Area
  - Total: 352.56 km^{2} (136.12 sq mi)
- Elevation: 33 m (108 ft)

Population (2010)
  - Total: 4,162
- Time zone: UTC-6 (Central Standard Time)
- INEGI Code: 009
- Major Airport: Merida (Manuel Crescencio Rejón) International Airport
- IATA Code: MID
- ICAO Code: MMMD

Chikindzonot Municipality (In the Yucatec Maya Language: “cenote in the west”) is a municipality in the Mexican state of Yucatán containing 352.56 km^{2} of land and located roughly 170 km southeast of the city of Mérida.

== History ==
It is unknown which chieftainship the area was under prior to the arrival of the Spanish. After the conquest the area became part of the encomienda system which lasted until the end of the colonial era. Yucatán declared its independence from the Spanish Crown in 1821 and in 1825, the area was assigned to the Valladolid region.

During the Caste War of Yucatán, the village was sacked by the rebel indigenous people and the 300 white inhabitants fled. Colonel Eulogio Rosado y Estevéz established a headquarters in 1848, 25 miles away in the town of Ichmul, to try to recover Chikindzonot. In 1849, Lt. Col. Pablo A. González y Osorio was able to retake the town, and thereafter it slowly repopulated.

It was designated as its own municipality in 1957.

== Governance ==
The municipal president is elected for a three-year term. The town council has seven councilpersons, who serve as Secretary and councilors of public security, public sanitation and monuments.

== Communities ==
The head of the municipality is Chikindzonot, Yucatán. The other populated areas of the municipality include Chan-Chimilá, Chan Santa María e Ichmul; Chaxán, Ichmul, San Cristóbal, San José, Xarco, X-Campana, X-Kancabdzonot, Xkanteíl, Xoax Dzonot, Xpoxil, Yokdzonot Carrillo, and Yokdzonot Viejo. The significant populations are shown below:

Community	Population
Entire Municipality (2010)	4,162
Chan-Chichimilá	449 in 2005
Chikindzonot	2607 in 2005
Ichmul	893 in 2005

== Local festivals ==
Every year from the 1 to the 18 February the town holds a traditional village festival and in October, a celebration for its patron saint, St. Francis of Assisi.

== Tourist attractions ==
- Church of San Antonio de Padua, built in the sixteenth century
- Church of La Purísima Concepción, built in the seventeenth century
- Chapel of San Pedro, built in the seventeenth century
- Cenote Chan Dzitnup
- Cenote Chikindzonot
- Cenote El Cabo
- Cenote Naranja
- Cenote Yaaxdzonot
- Archaeological site Bolmay
- Archaeological site Palaban
- Archaeological site Petul
- Archaeological site Poxil
- Archaeological site Sotpol
- Archaeological site Tamba
- Archaeological site Xalau
- Archaeological site Xcan
- Archaeological site Xcoom
- Archaeological site Xmaos
- Archaeological site Xuyap
