= Abalá, Yucatán =

Town in the Mexican state of Yucatán

Abalá
- Municipal Seat
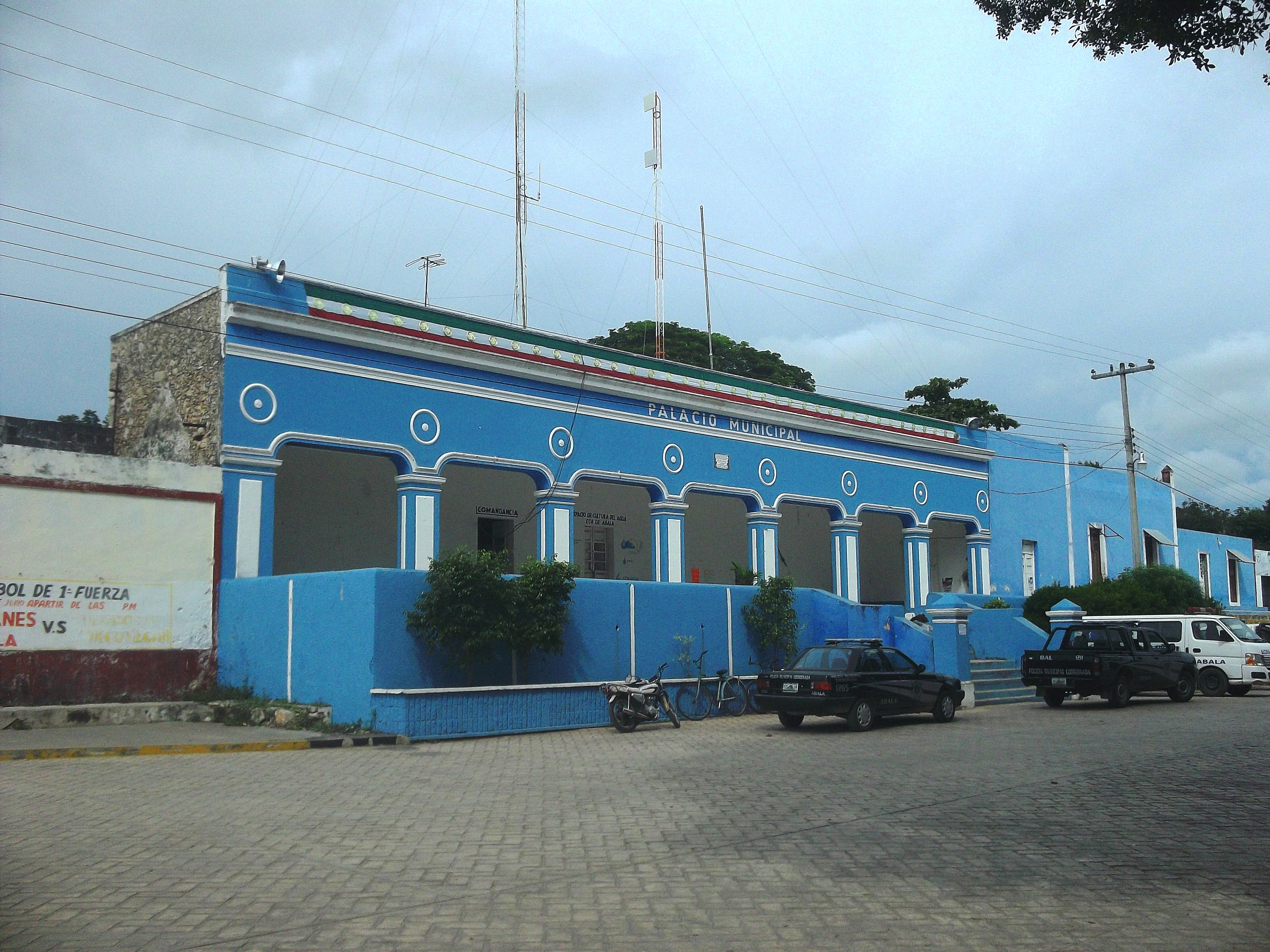
- Municipality headquarters

- Location within Yucatán (state)
- Coordinates: 20°38′48″N 89°40′47″W
- Country: Mexico
- State: Yucatán
- Municipality: Abalá
- Elevation: 10 m (33 ft)

Population (2020)
  - Total: 6,550
- Time zone: UTC-6 (Central Standard Time)
- Postal code: 97825
- Area code: 988

Abalá is a town and the municipal seat of the Abalá Municipality, Yucatán, Mexico. As of 2020, the town has a population of 6'550.

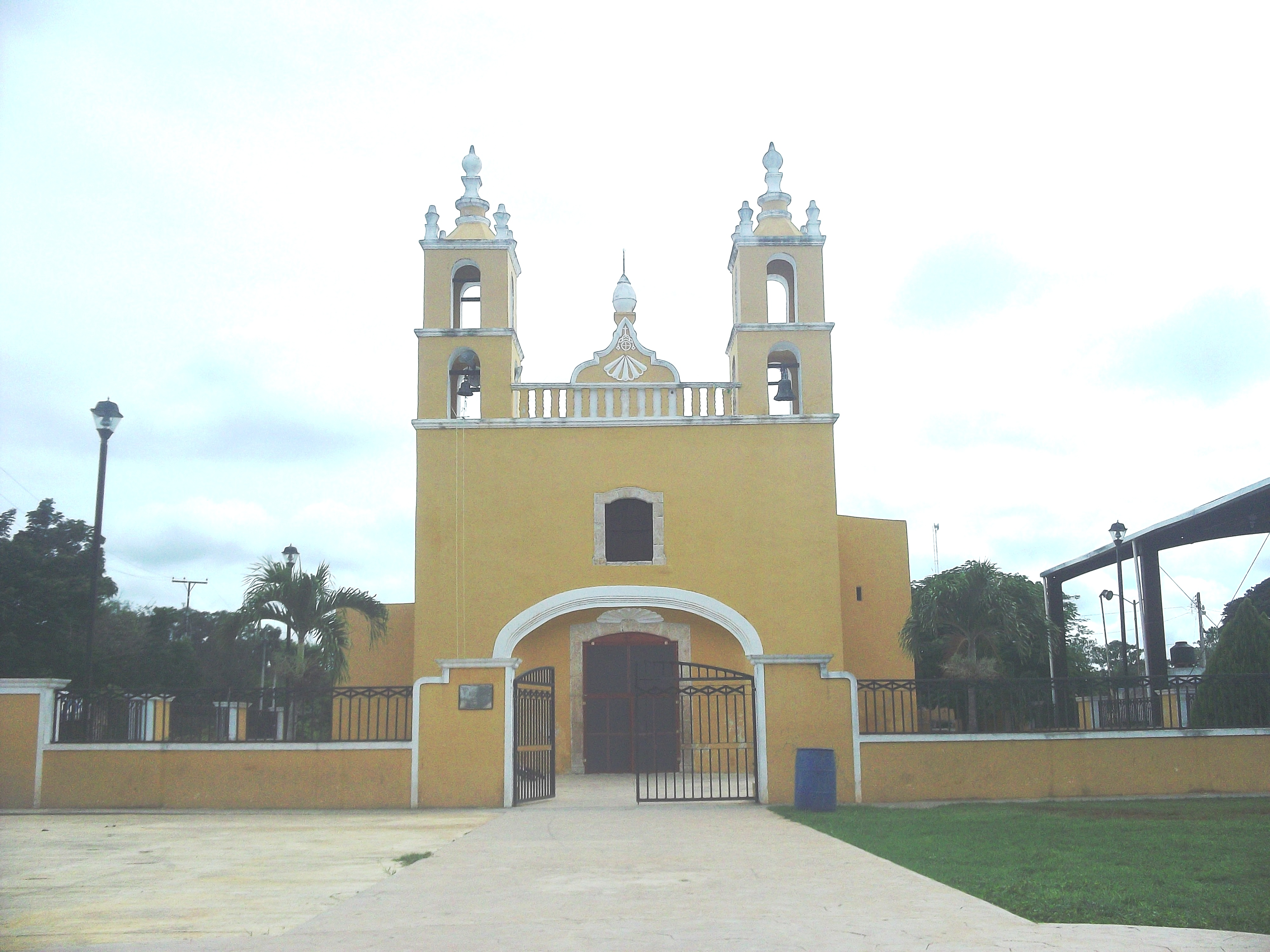
Town church

== Demographics ==
View chart definition.
