= San José Chactún =

- Hacienda
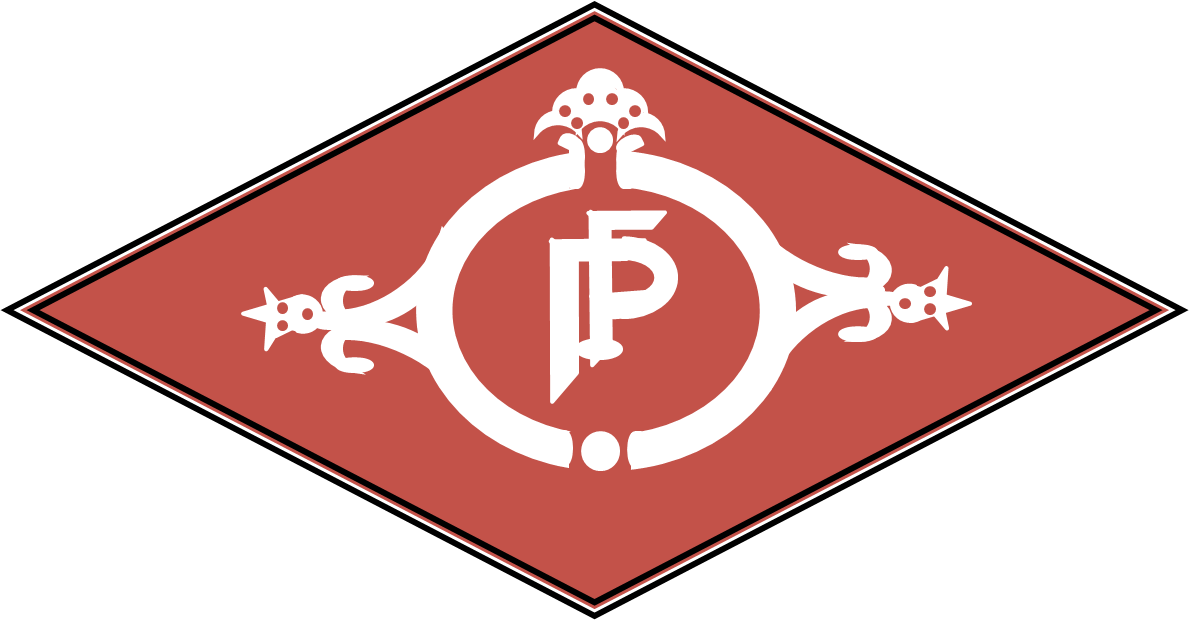
- Motto: Piedra Roja (Red Stone)
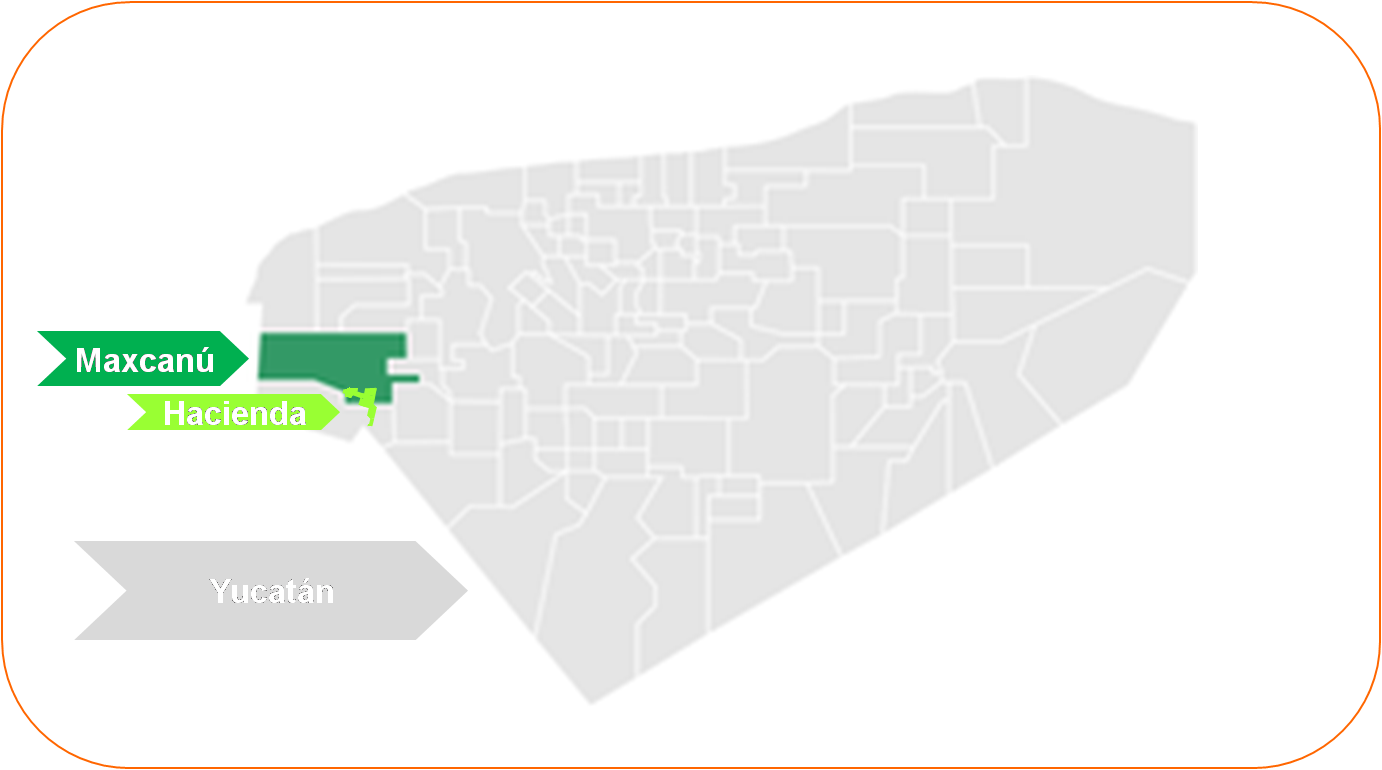

- Location within Yucatán (state) Location within Mexico
- Coordinates: 20°31′26″N 90°00′35″W
- Country: Mexico
- State: Yucatán
- Municipality: Maxcanú Municipality
- Founded: 1560
- Elevation: 13 m (43 ft)
- Demonym: Chactuneño
- Time zone: Central Standard Time
  - Summer (DST): Central Daylight Time
- Postal code: 97000
- Area code: (52) 997
- Major Airport: Merida (Manuel Crescencio Rejón) International Airport
- IATA Code: MID
- ICAO Code: MMMD

The Hacienda San José Chactún is a hacienda located in the State of Yucatán in Mexico.

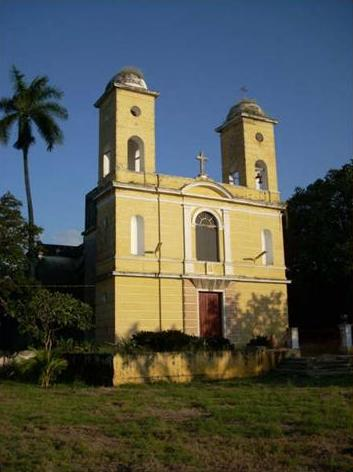
Viceregal Church

== Location ==
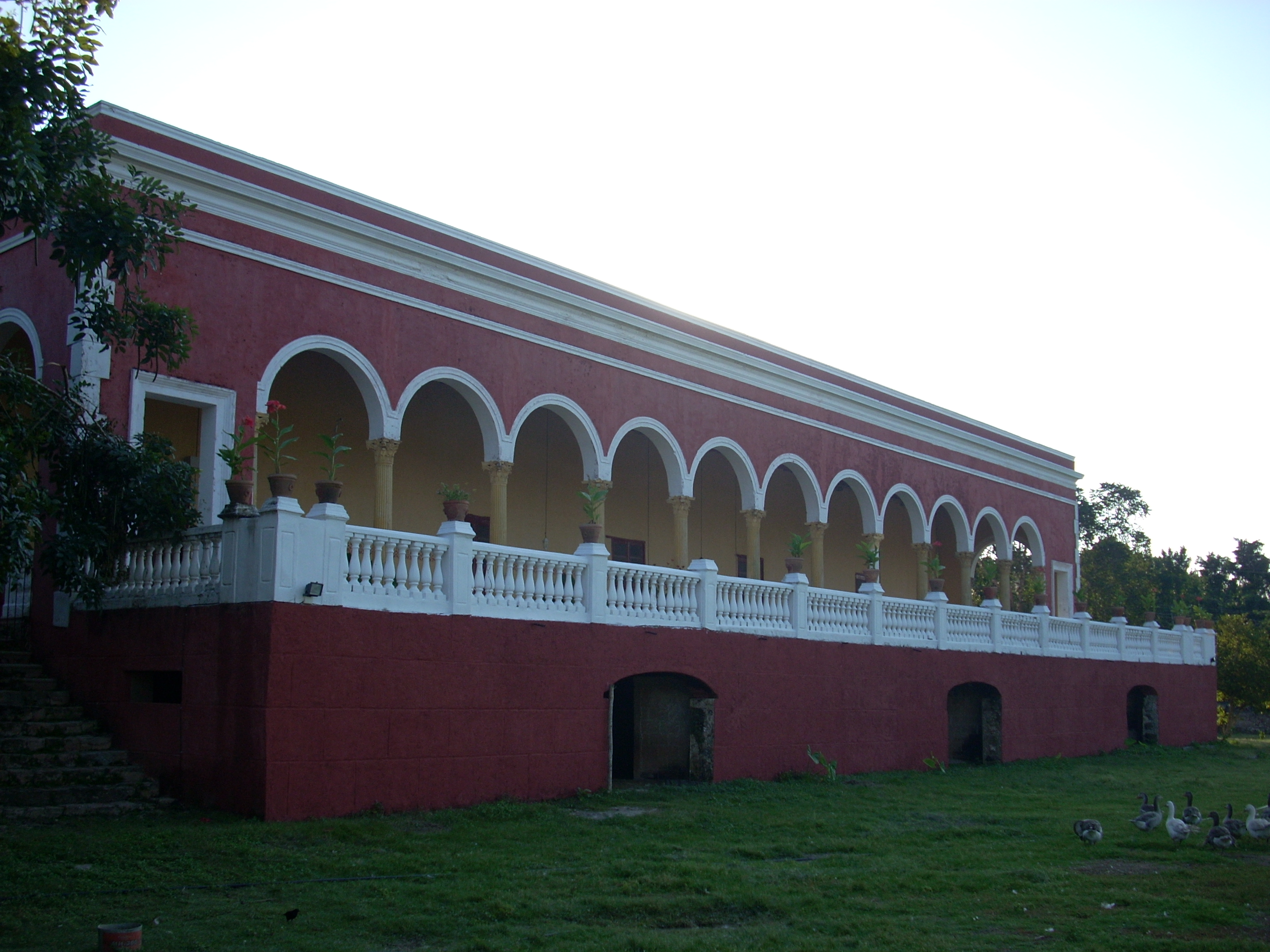
Main House

The hacienda contains historical relics, extensive virgin areas, and a high biodiversity in wildlife. It is very close to the archaeological sites of Uxmal (Heritage), Oxkintok and path Puuc, to the caves of Calcehtok and Loltún and the colonial cities of Merida and Campeche (Heritage), the route of the Franciscan Monastery and the coastal area and biosphere reserve Celestún e Isla Arenas and to the famous Chichen Itza site.

== Pre-Hispanic history ==
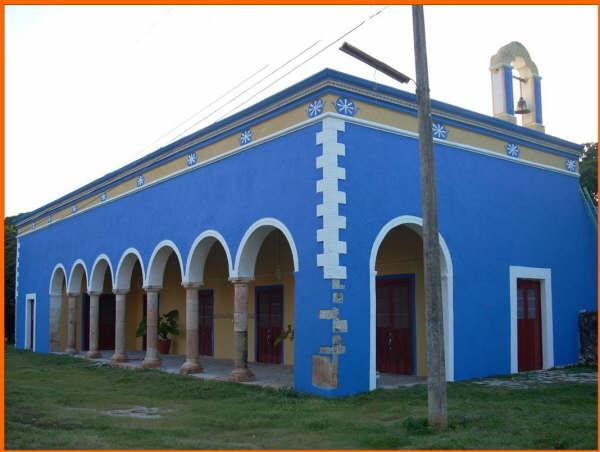
Raya's House

The original city is attributed to the Toltec, its archaeological remains dating back over 2,800 years. The first Mayans settlements dating from the late Classical period. It lies within the Mayan region known today as "Puuc". The population was united with its more important neighbors by the white roads called "sacbé", which were used to perform a religious function. The meaning of the name of the settlement was "Red Rock" or "red stone" due to the natural color of their building in stone. In the National Archaeological Museum of Spain, there are parts of the ancient Toltec city that Don Jose Dominguez (owner of the hacienda) in 1865 gave the Marquis de la Rivera, Don Juan Ximénez de Sandoval.

In the third international conference Mayanist, in 1995, it is mentioned as one of the Chactún initial locations in the Mayan world, next to the Mirador, Izapa, Kaminaljuyu, Abaj Takalik, Auaxactun, and Tikal, which developed the architecture and urbanization around 300 BCE.

In the story of the discoveries made in 1876 by Dr. Augustus Le Plogeon in the Yucatán, which was published under the title "The Maya, the sources of their history", the hacienda Chactun is mentioned:

"When visiting the large estate of Chactun, belonging to Don José Dominguez, thirty miles [50 km] south-west of Mérida, the writer saw a large ruin similar to that called the 'House of the Nuns' at Uxmal. It was a building of a quadrangular shape, with apartments opening on an interior court in the centre of the quadrangle. The building was in good preservation, and some of the rooms were used as depositories for corn. The visiting party breakfasted in one of the larger apartments."

== Hacienda Chactun history ==
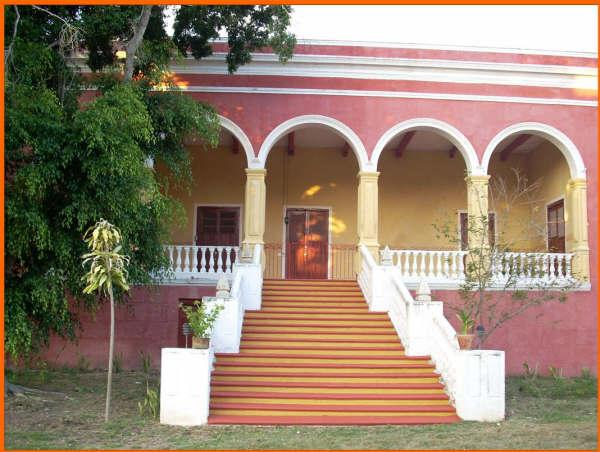
Colonial Staircase

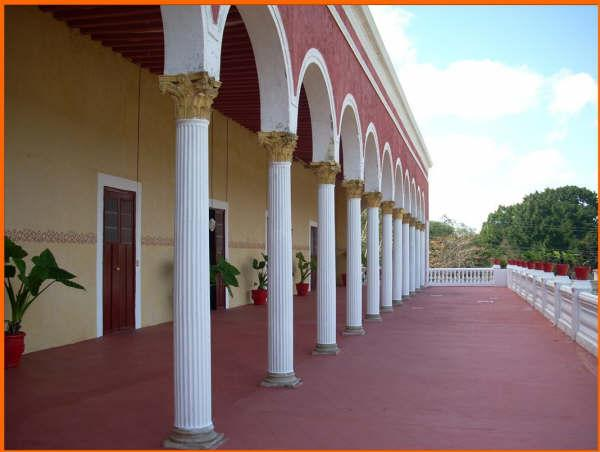
Arcade Corridor

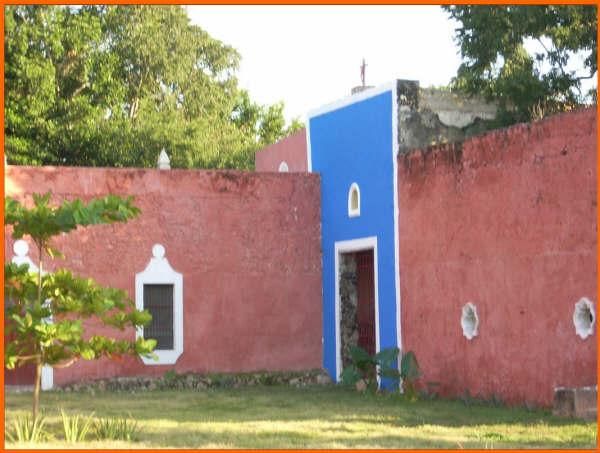
Colonial Church

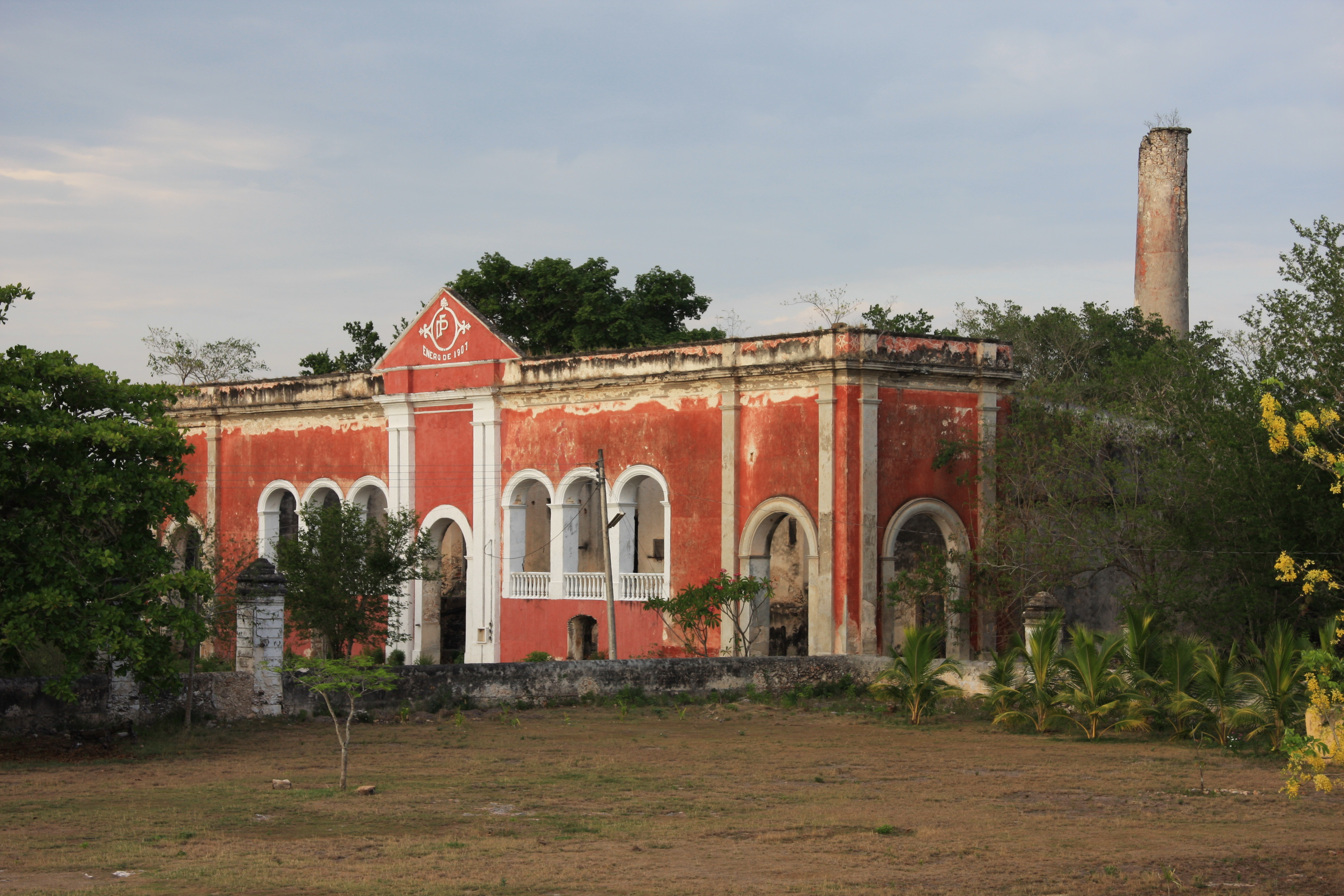
Home Machines

Haciendas in Yucatán were part of an economic system begun by the Spanish in the 16th century, similar to European feudal system. Initially dedicated to the production of corn, their activities will be diversified with the production of cane sugar, henequen and cattle. San Jose Chactún became a leading hacienda in the heyday of the state of Yucatán as a result of technological and social advances. With a train station and many services for worker, the Hacienda functioned as a small town. It has two churches, a main house and a house of stripes, and the ruins of the old canteen, the mill and the stables and a monumental home machines.

The title of the first lands in the royal decree is January 9, 1560, granted in Cogolludo lib.6, Cap.8. The land was vastly improved between 1623 and 1700, the site of Nohcacab (in the municipality of Becal) was sold in that year, with a sales letter dated 24 December, and so the property became the Hacienda "Chactún Nohcacab", bounded by Maxcanú, Becal, Calkiní and Halachó.

In the second half of 18th century it is known that the property was acquired by a Spaniard, named Pedro Tadeo, as reported in Indian file documents.

In the first half of the 19th century the estate had passed into the hands of Lorenzo Peon y Cano (his grandfather, Alonso Manuel de Peon Valdes, had come to Indian in the first half of the 18th century), then the estate was inherited by Maria de Jesus Peon Fajardo and her son José Dominguez Peón.

For much of the 19th century and all the 20th century the estate has been linked to the same family, also owners of the palace Montejo in Merida. Jose Dominguez Peon, a shareholder in the railroad Merida-Campeche, got one of the 8 stops on the railway line, which opened in 1898, was at the hacienda owned "San Jose Chactún".

Henequen production continued until about 60 years ago. Since then the estate was gradually losing its splendor. Sara Arrigunaga juanes began the project of renovating the hacienda by repairing buildings and trying to increase its production with ranching and citrus production.

The patron saints of the hacienda are Saint Joseph (March 19) and Our Lady of the Immaculate Conception (December 8).

== Sources ==
- Archivo General de Indias, Audiencia de México AGI, Mexico 3066
- Nancy M. Farriss, "Propiedades territoriales en Yucatán en la época colonial: algunas observaciones acerca de la pobreza española y la autonomía indígena," en Historia Mexicana, México 1980, v. XXX
- Nancy M. Farriss, Nucleation versus dispersal: The dynamics of population movement in colonial Yucatán
- Bracamonte, P y Solís, R., Los espacios de autonomía maya, Ed. UADY, Mérida, 1997.
- Nancy Marguerite Farriss, Maya society under colonial rule: the collective enterprise of survival, 1984 by Princeton University Press
- Registro Público de la propiedad y del comercio de Yucatán, Títulos de Chactún
- Gobierno del Estado de Yucatán, Los municipios de Yucatán, 1988.
- Kurjack, Edward y Silvia Garza, Atlas arqueológico del Estado de Yucatán, Ed. INAH, 1980.
- Patch, Robert, La formación de las estancias y haciendas en Yucatán durante la colonia, Ed. UADY, 1976.
- Peón Ancona, J. F., "Las antiguas haciendas de Yucatán", en Diario de Yucatán, Mérida, 1971.
- Ayuntamiento de Maxcanú, Yucatán
- Carlos Justo Sierra, Campeche en el siglo XIX
- Stephen Salisbury, Jr., The Mayas, the Sources of Their History / Dr. Le Plongeon in Yucatán, His Account of Discoveries
- Demography and parish affairs in Yucatán, 1797-1897: documents from the ... Escrito por Joaquín de Arrigunaga Peón, Carol Steichen Dumond, Don E. Dumond, Archivo de la Mitra
- Redemption's archive: revolutionary figures and Indian work in Yucatán, Mexico Escrito por Paul K. Eiss
