= Chactunx =

Coordinates: 20°32′00″N 90°00′00″W

Chactunx is a settlement in the municipality of Maxcanú in Yucatán state, Mexico. This village is between the towns of Maxcanú and Halachó.

== See also ==
- Halachó
- Maxcanú
