= Celestún Municipality =

Municipality in the Mexican state of Yucatán

Celestún
- Municipality
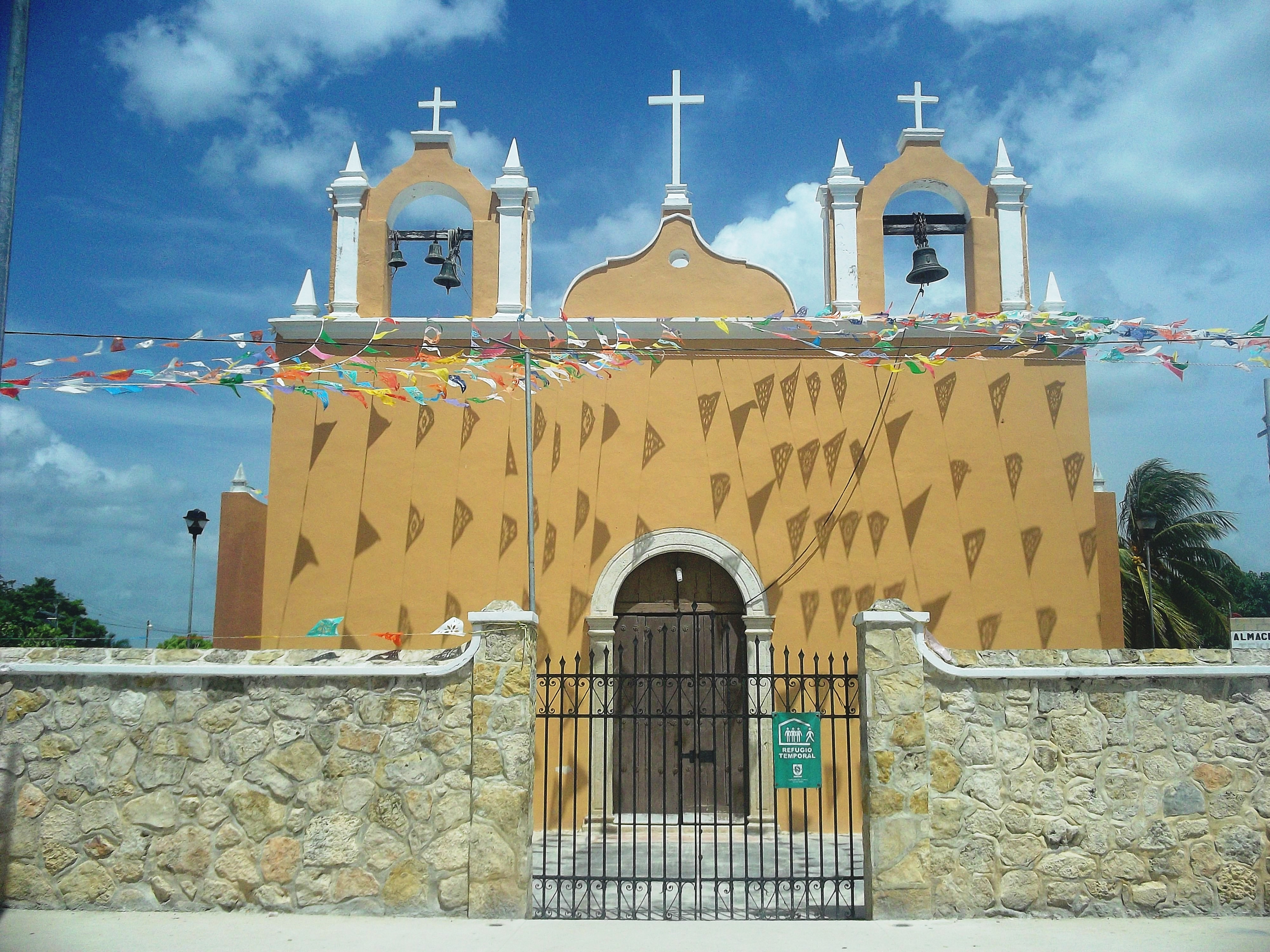
- Principal Church of Celestún, Yucatán

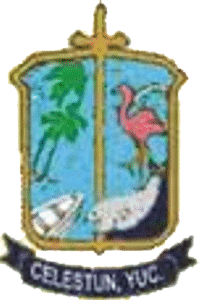
- Coat of arms

- Region 1 Poniente #011

- Location of the Municipality in Mexico
- Coordinates: 20°51′33″N 90°24′00″W
- Country: Mexico
- State: Yucatán
- Mexico Ind.: 1821
- Yucatán Est.: 1824

Government
  - Type: 2012–2015
  - Municipal President: Rosa Alba Acosta Narváez

Area
  - Total: 868.63 km^{2} (335.38 sq mi)
- Elevation: 3 m (9.8 ft)

Population (2010)
  - Total: 6,831
  - Density: 7.864/km^{2} (20.37/sq mi)
  - Demonym: Umanense
- Time zone: UTC-6 (Central Standard Time)
- INEGI Code: 011
- Major Airport: Merida (Manuel Crescencio Rejón) International Airport
- IATA Code: MID
- ICAO Code: MMMD

Celestún Municipality (Yucatec Maya: "terror of stone") is a municipality in the Mexican state of Yucatán containing 868.63 km^{2} of land and is located roughly 105 kilometres (65 mi) west of the city of Mérida.

== History ==
There is no accurate data on when the town was founded, but it was a settlement before the conquest and was located in the chieftainship of Ah-Canul. After colonization, the area was one of the few that did not become part of the encomienda system, and was established in 1718, as a town under the jurisdiction of Sisal, where it served as an important source of salt.

Yucatán declared its independence from the Spanish Crown in 1821 and the area was transferred from Sisal to the Maxcanú Municipality in 1872. In 1918 the area became its own municipality.

== Governance ==
The municipal president is elected for a three-year term. The town council has four councilpersons, who serve as Secretary and councilors of heritage and public monuments; public security; public works, nomenclature and recruitment; and public buildings and ecology.

== Communities ==
The head of the municipality is Celestún, Yucatán. Among the other populated places of the municipality are Calan, Chamúl, Chín, Hoyuelos, Man, Stal and Tzate. The significant populations are shown below:

| Community | Population |
|---|---|
| Entire Municipality (2010) | 6,831 |
| Celestún | 6243 in 2005 |

== Local festivals ==
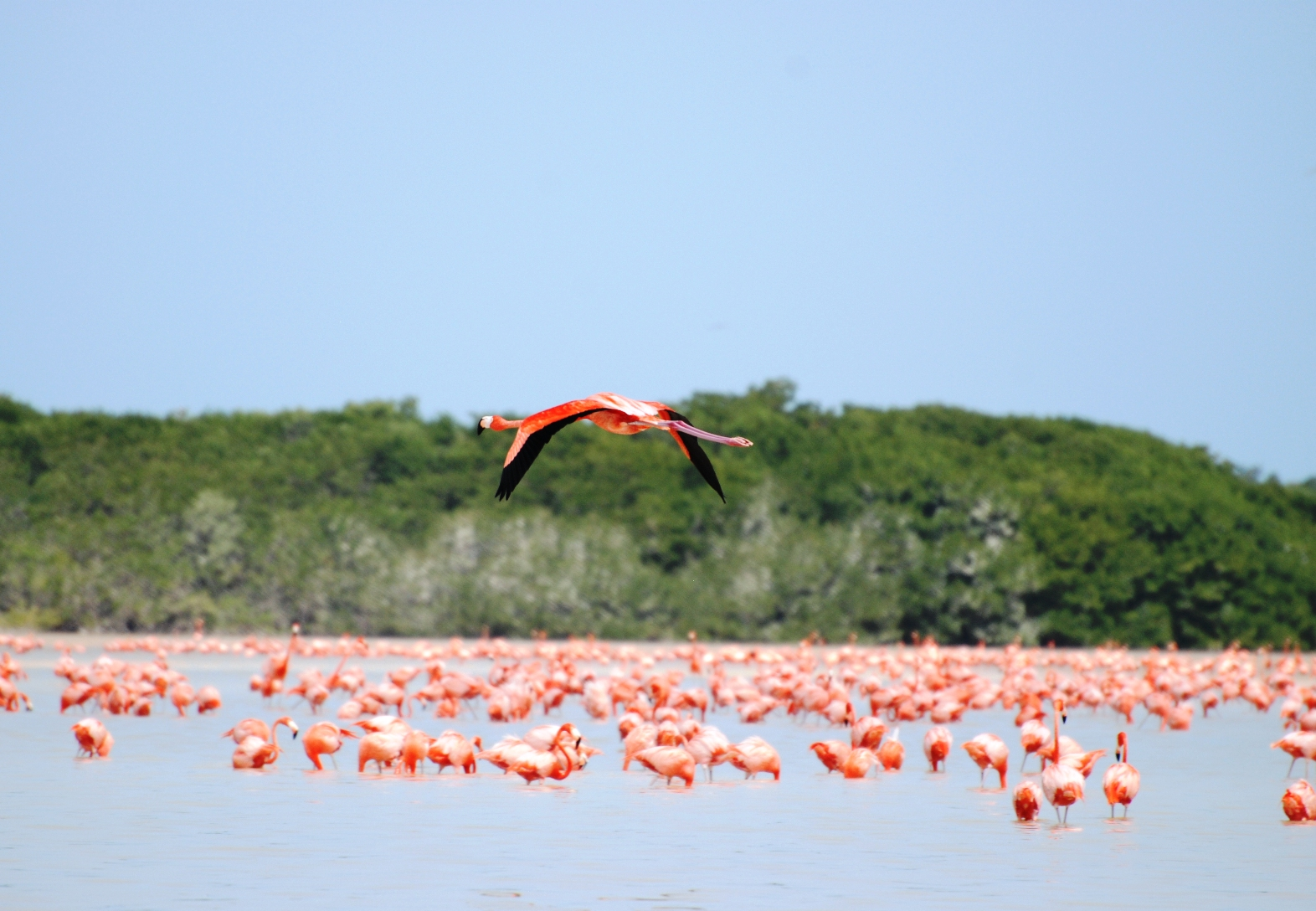
Celestun Flamingos

Every year from 1 to 12 December the town celebrates the feast of the Immaculate Conception. There is also an annual celebration on 1 June for Navy Day.

== Tourist attractions ==
- Church of the Immaculate Conception
- Birding
