= Chunchucmil =

Pre-Columbian Maya city in Mexico

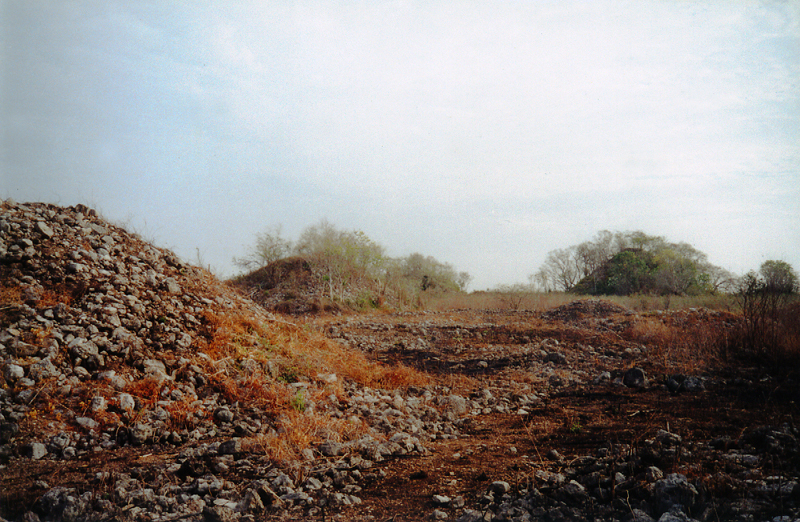
- Archaeological mounds of ancient Chunchucmil

- Location within Yucatán
- 20°38′18.82″N 90°11′24.79″W
- Periods: Middle Preclassic - Terminal Classic
- Cultures: Maya
- Location: Maxcanú
- Region: Yucatán, Mexico

Site notes
- Area: 25–65 square kilometres (9.7–25.1 mi^{2})

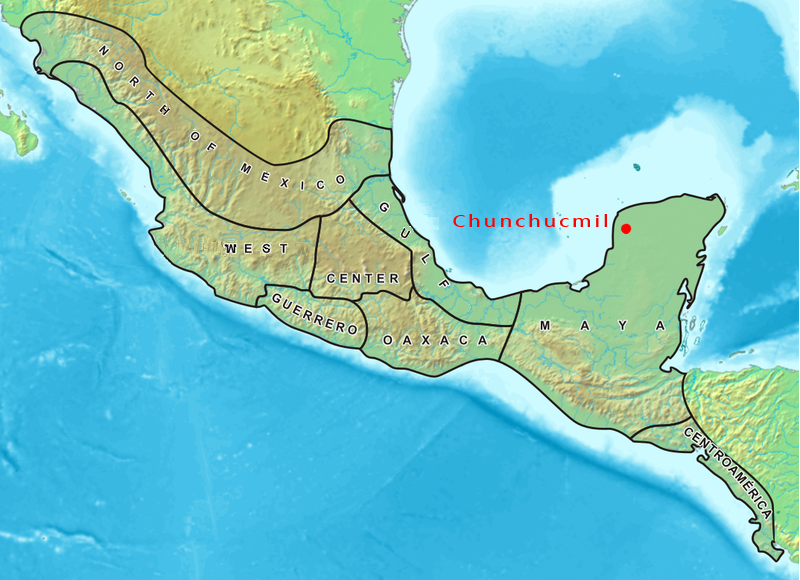
Map of Mesoamerica highlighting the location of Chunchucmil

Chunchucmil was once a large, sprawling pre-Columbian Maya city located in the western part of what is now the state of Yucatán, Mexico.

Although the famous explorer and author John Lloyd Stephens traveled within a few kilometers of Chunchucmil during his historic journey across the Yucatán Peninsula (he even met with the owner of the nearby haciendas), the archaeological site went relatively unnoticed by Maya scholars for more than a century because virtually no monuments (stelae) or other grand sculptures have been found there. The lack of royal monuments, combined with other archaeological data, may indicate that Chunchucmil was not a city ruled by a single divine king, as most other Maya polities. Instead, it may have been a commercial center, organized by various lineages and focused upon funneling goods between regions—such as the trade between the Gulf of Mexico and the interior of the Yucatán Peninsula.

Chunchucmil was most populous in the Middle Classical Period (400–650 AD), with an estimated 31,000–43,000 (within the central 25 km^{2} area) people.

== Site characteristics ==
=== Location ===
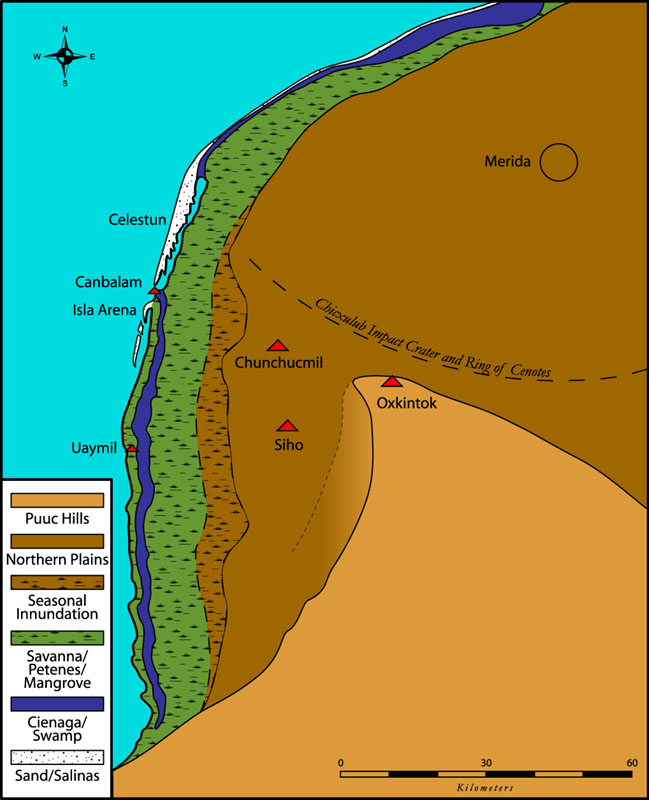
Thematic map of major archaeological sites and ecological zones related to Chunchucmil

The site center is located ca. 27 km (16.8 mi) inland from the Gulf of Mexico and approximately halfway between the coast and the next largest archaeological site of Oxkintok. It was named in the late 1970s after the nearest modern settlement (the Hacienda and village of Chunchucmil), however the archaeological site is so large that it extends onto the ejido lands of at least five modern communities: Chunchucmil, Kochol, San Mateo, Coahuila and Halachó. The majority of the ancient Maya site is located within the municipality of Maxcanú, however a portion of it is situated on land pertaining to the municipality of Halachó.

=== Environment and ecology ===
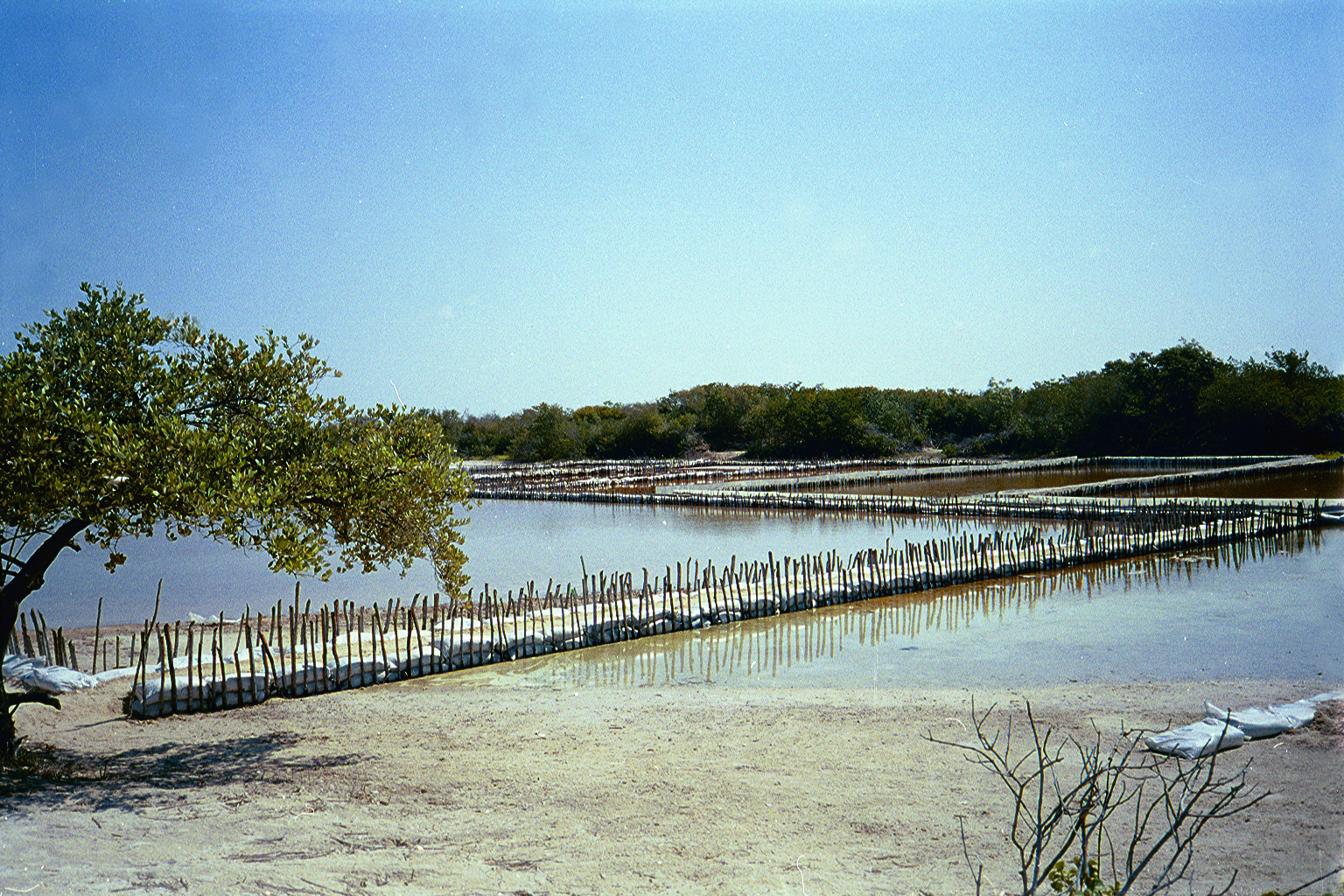
Salt evaporation ponds of Celestún in the Yucatan Peninsula

The site of Chunchucmil is located on a narrow band of semi-arid terrain that parallels portions of the western and northern coastlines in Yucatán and Campeche. This particular environmental zone is considered the driest in all of the Maya area, with less than 800 mm (31.5 in) of annual rainfall. Compounding these harsh conditions, nearly fifty percent of the surface around Chunchucmil is exposed limestone bedrock. Even when soils are encountered, they are rarely more than a few centimeters in depth. Vegetation in this region is generally considered scrub forest dominated by acacia and other drought-resistant species (similar to the European heathland). One of the mysteries surrounding Chunchucmil is how such a large city could have sustained itself in one of the poorest regions for agriculture.

However, the ancient city was situated at the edge of this semi-arid ecological zone, exactly where the dry Yucatecan plains dip and fracture into vast wetlands (see map). Immediately to the west of Chunchucmil are found the seasonally inundated savannas, fresh water petenes (or ojos de agua), and eventually the brackish mangrove estuary where the Yucatán aquifer empties into the Gulf of Mexico near the ancient Maya coastal site of Canbalam. It is likely that ancient Chunchucmil was purposefully situated to take advantage of multiple ecological zones, including coastal resources such as the salt-beds of the Celestún peninsula, and to increase accessibility to the vigorous circum-peninsular canoe trade route of Pre-Columbian times, using Canbalam as its port of entry.

=== Etymology ===
The term "Chunchucmil" was originally used to name a freshwater well (Ch'en Chun Chukum), the central water source for the cattle ranch that eventually grew to become the historic henequen hacienda of Chunchucmil. Most wells in this region are named after animals or plants. In this case, the words Ch'en Chun Chukum literally mean "the well at the base of the Chukum tree" (Havardia albicans). Local Maya speakers still refer to the modern village of Chunchucmil as Chun Chukum when speaking in their native tongue. The ancient Maya archaeological site was given the name Chunchucmil by archaeologists in the 1970s because that was the closest modern community to the site center. Local Maya villagers today do not have a single term to refer to the ruins, since the ancient city is so large that it encompasses most of their lands.

=== Site size ===
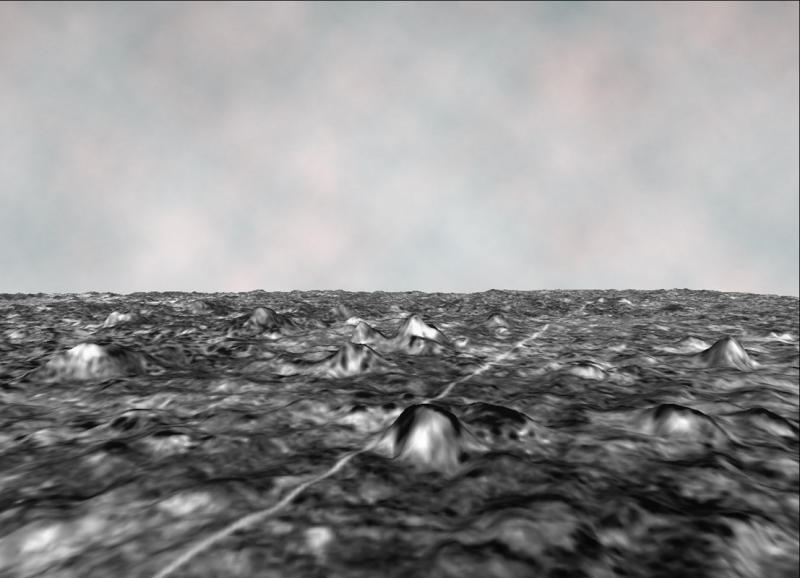
Digital Elevation Model combined with an aerial photograph showing pyramidal architecture of Chunchucmil

The exact size of Chunchucmil is currently being studied using aerial photography, satellite imagery, and survey transects by the Pakbeh Regional Economy Project (who have been working at Chunchucmil since the mid-1990s, under the direction of Dr. Bruce H. Dahlin). Estimates range from 25 km^{2} for the more compact urban settlement to around 64 km^{2} for the city and its adjoining suburbs and farmsteads. In either case, this places the site of Chunchucmil among some of the largest and most densely settled ancient Maya polities.

=== Chronology ===
Ceramic data indicate that the Chunchucmil region was occupied from the Middle Preclassic (Middle Formative) through the Postclassic periods of Maya prehistory. However, widespread test excavations within the architectural groups of ancient Chunchucmil indicate that the city reached its apogee during the latter part of the Early Classic and the early part of the Late Classic, attaining its maximum spatial extent, population, and structural density. This period is defined in some areas as the "Middle Classic." Chunchucmil appears to have gone into decline during the latter part of the Late Classic. The Terminal Classic (or Puuc) occupation at Chunchucmil is ephemeral at best, and the Postclassic occupation at the site consisted of squatter-like settlement. A few early colonial homesteads have been found, but the region was largely abandoned between the Maya Postclassic period and the beginnings of the cattle ranches and henequen haciendas of historic and modern times.

== Built environment ==
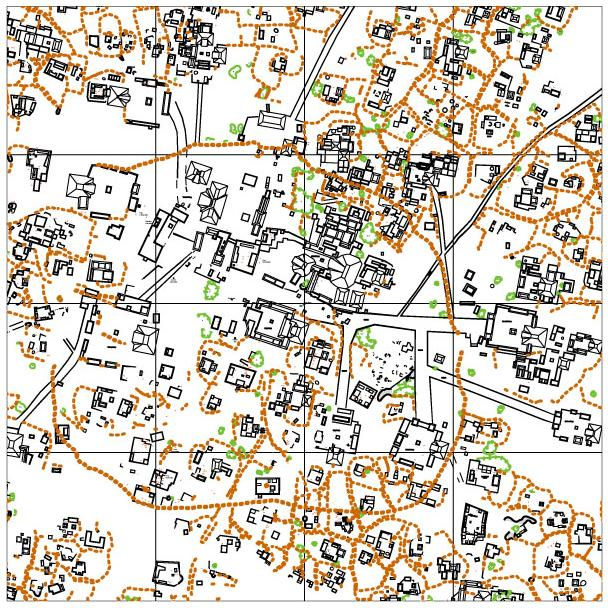
Map of the central 1 km^{2} of ancient Chunchucmil

=== Monumental architecture ===
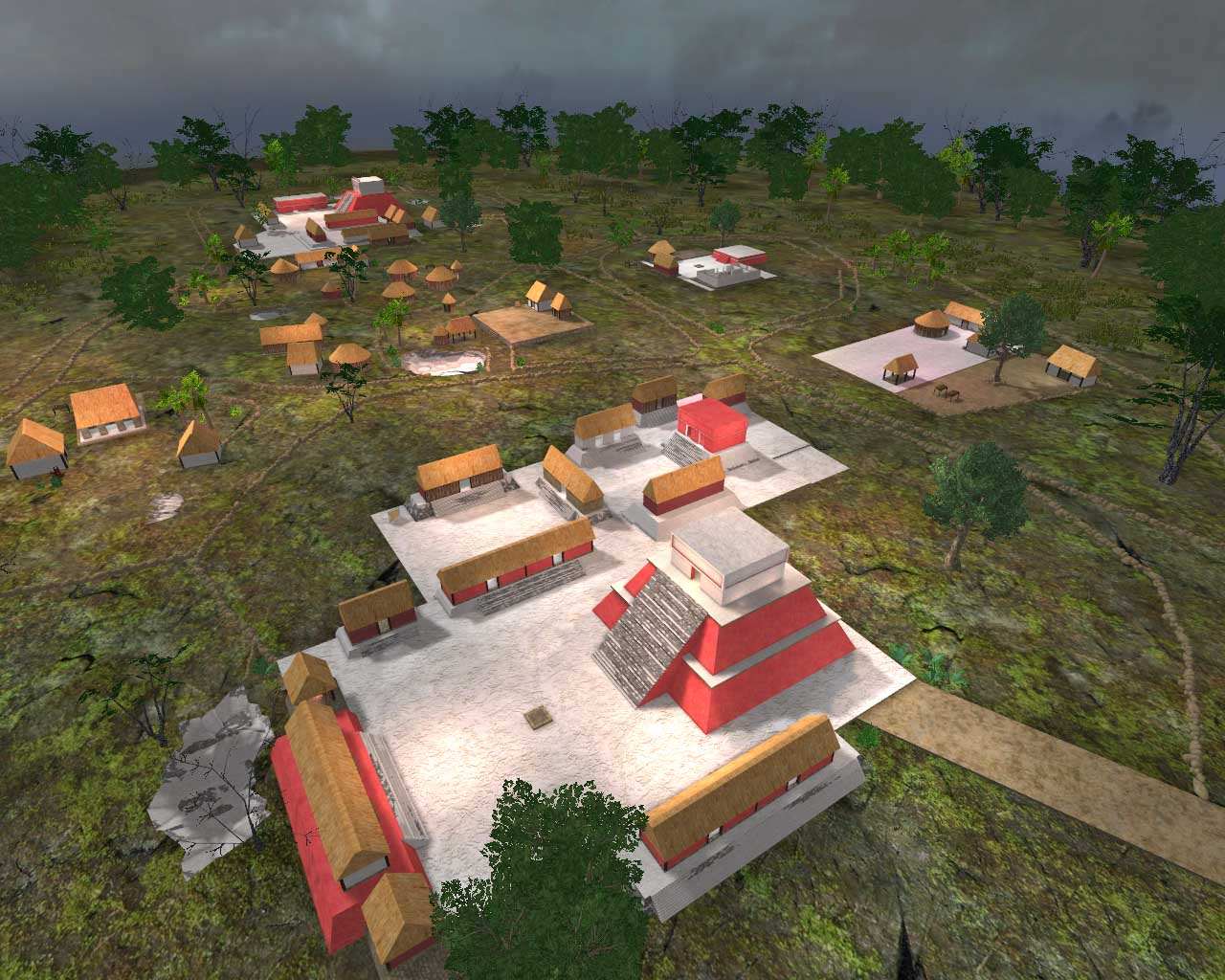
Reconstruction of the "Pich" Quadrangle Group at Chunchucmil

The Classic Period site center of Chunchucmil is dominated by over a dozen pyramids ranging in height from 8 to 18 m (26 to 60 ft) tall. Each pyramid is part of a structural arrangement referred to as a "quadrangle group" by members of the Pakbeh Regional Economy Project. Quadrangle groups consist of an enclosed courtyard flanked by a pyramid on one side (which faces inward towards the courtyard) and a number of ranged and compact structures along the remaining three sides. Within each quadrangle group's courtyard is a small central platform that is interpreted as a focal point of ritualized activities (such as an altar). Other ceremonies would have taken place within the temples atop each pyramid. With the temple pyramids and central platforms acting as loci of lineage-based ritual, quadrangle groups likely housed the upper-echelon elites of ancient Chunchucmil that may have been active in the socio-political, ideological and economic administration of the city. Of particular importance is the fact that each major quadrangle group is connected to the others through a network of sacbeob (stone causeways), suggesting an unknown degree of connectedness between the residing lineages and (potentially) cooperation or competition in ruling Chunchucmil. If this was indeed the case, Chunchucmil's political structure may have been roughly analogous to that suggested for the later Maya capital of Chichen Itza, referred to as a "multepal" system and characterized as rulership through council.

=== Residential architecture ===
Residential architecture at Chunchucmil often follows the same pattern as the large quadrangle groups, with structures arranged on four sides of a small plaza. This arrangement conforms to the "patio cluster" or "patio group" model for Maya residential organization, where two or more structures, potentially housing multiple family units, face a shared patio or courtyard.

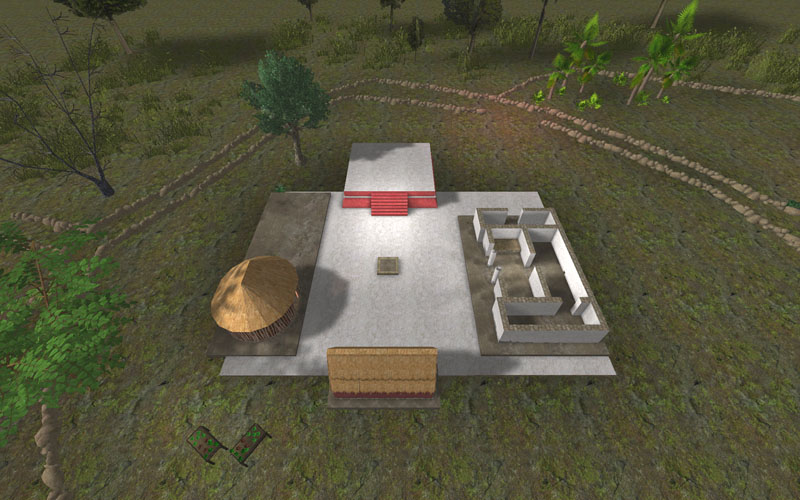
Reconstruction of the "Lóol" Residential Group at Chunchucmil

At Chunchucmil, these clusters of associated structures are encircled by low-lying stone walls (called albarradas), that demarcate domestic space by bounding the group's residential lot or yard (called a solar). The entire unit, consisting of the architecture and the associated solar, is today referred to as an "albarrada group". Unlike at the vast majority of Maya sites, Chunchucmil's albarrada groups contain clear boundaries between residential house lots and, as of result of this, researchers are better able to study such issues as settlement patterns, occupational density, population estimates, lineage structure, and social organization.

Many residential groups had a small temple or shrine (similar to the placement of the temple pyramids of their larger counterparts). These buildings served as loci for the performance of household rituals or other types of ideological practices. One such residential shrine that has been excavated and consolidated at the Lool Group revealed its form to be talud-tablero. This style of architecture is most famous at sites in Central Mexico, such as at the contemporaneous city of Teotihuacan. Beneath the stair of this shrine was a vessel that also replicated the pottery of that Central Mexican city. While this should not be used as evidence of direct Teotihuacan influence, it does suggest Chunchucmil's participation in the greater Mesoamerican communication sphere at the time of Teotihuacan's dominance. All other structures excavated at Chunchucmil thus far lack demonstrable Teotihuacan influence.

=== Transportation arteries ===
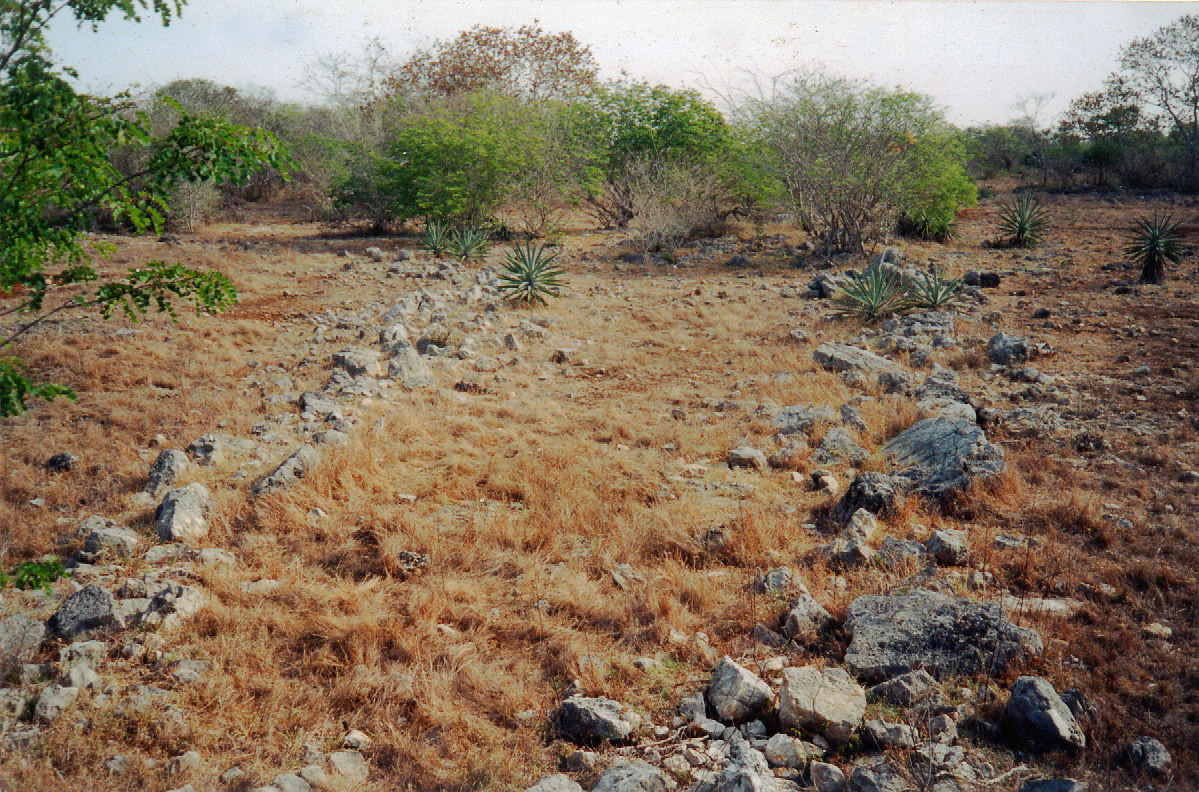
Pathway (Callejuela) between two albarrada groups of Chunchucmil

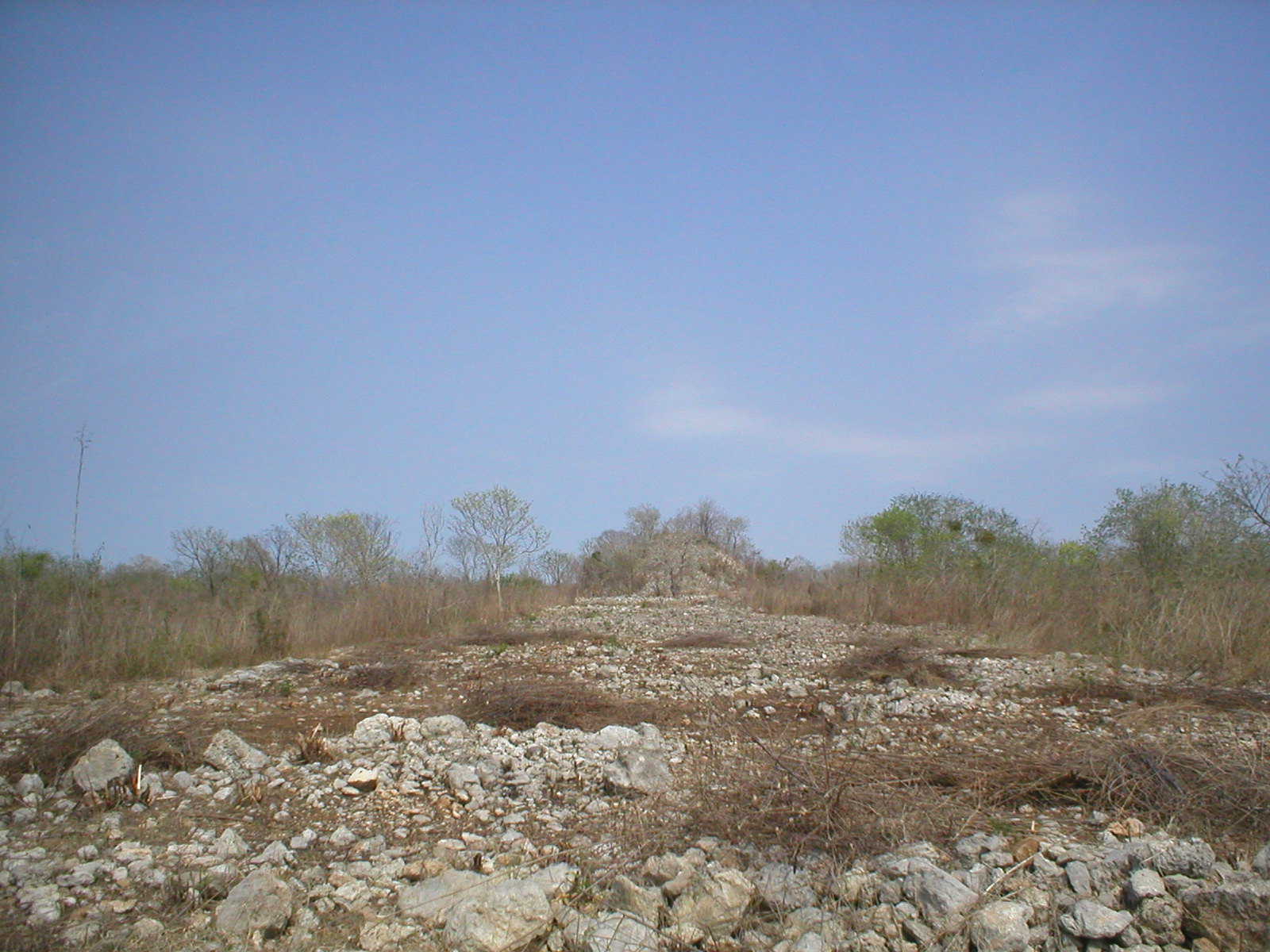
View along Sacbe 2, towards the "Chukum" Quadrangle Group

One of the distinguishing characteristics of Chunchucmil is its network of stone-lined paths. As mentioned above, the majority of residential lots are surrounded by albarradas (stone walls) that, when viewed on a map, give the site a honeycomb appearance. The space between adjacent albarradas form avenues or paths for foot traffic (called callejuelas, see photo) that radiate outward from the site center and into Chunchucmil's dense residential zone. By mapping these formations, researchers have been able to better understand the flow of traffic in and out of the site center as well as the relationship between Chunchucmil's central core, its residential urban sprawl, and its outlying peripheral settlement.

Beyond Chunchucmil, in the seasonally inundated western wetlands, researchers have found a network of rock alignments that connect Chunchucmil's periphery to other outlying settlements. Such rock alignments, called andadores by Maya archaeologists, would have provided sure footing through the wetlands, like stepping stones, leading travelers to various towns and resources in Chunchucmil's hinterland. While not all of these andadores have been followed to their final destinations, the general orientation of the longest alignments suggest that they may have functioned to connect Chunchucmil with the coast near Canbalam.

=== Barricade and abandonment ===
One of the first features of Chunchucmil to gain widespread attention was a stone wall, visible in aerial photos taken by the Atlas project, that roughly encircles 350,000 square metres of the site center (including most of the major Quadrangle Groups). Early reconnaissance by the Pakbeh Regional Economy Project in the late 1990s found that the wall, which stood between 1 and 1.5 m tall and had a perimeter of 1.8 km, was incomplete. It formed a large "C" shape with a 340 m wide gap open to the west (see map). Further mapping and excavation revealed that the wall runs above every major feature at the ancient site (crossing sacbeob', albarradas, and many residential groups). Based upon the law of superposition (an archaeological concept borrowed from the field of geology), this meant that the large barricade was likely the last feature to be built at the site. Furthermore, the stones used to create the barricade were clearly robbed from nearby structures (rather than freshly quarried). Given this data, it has been hypothesized that the barricade was constructed rapidly at the end of Chunchucmil's history, possibly to protect the remaining inhabitants from an invasion that arrived before the wall could be completed, leading to the ultimate demise of the ancient city.

== Economy and diet ==
=== Lithic economy ===
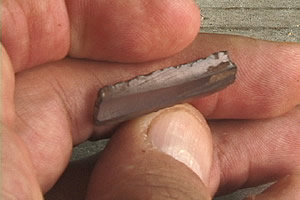
Obsidian prismatic blade fragment, Chunchucmil

The chipped-stone assemblage of Chunchucmil is dominated by obsidian prismatic blades. The prismatic blade industry was ubiquitous throughout Mesoamerica and primarily used in the production of obsidian tools. Lithic analyses have determined that the majority of the blades at Chunchucmil were likely imported in finished form, as suggested by the general scarcity of polyhedral cores, production debitage, rejuvenation artifacts, and manufacturing errors at the site. Other types of tools made from obsidian, especially formal bifacial tools, are rare, but present, at Chunchucmil. Bifacial obsidian tools include a small collection of projectile points and ambiguous tool fragments. Unifacial tools are generally absent. Other types of industries, such as expedient flake production or bipolar reduction, are also absent at Chunchucmil.

The exploitation of non-obsidian stone resources (e.g., chert, chalcedony, and quartz) did occur at Chunchucmil, but these materials are much less common than obsidian. The majority of these resources, especially chert, were obtained locally from nodules in the limestone bedrock, but were very poor in quality. While a number of formal tools were produced from chert and quartz, most non-obsidian tools were informal and produced through expedient flake production.

The fact that obsidian was favored over local resources for utilitarian tools is interesting, especially considering that obsidian had to be imported over long distances. The El Chayal obsidian source (which is the most common at Chunchucmil), is located nearly 1000 km (621 mi) away (as the crow flies) in Guatemala. This, once again, indicates Chunchucmil's close ties with external trade routes and the greater Mesoamerican world of the Classic period.

=== Market system ===
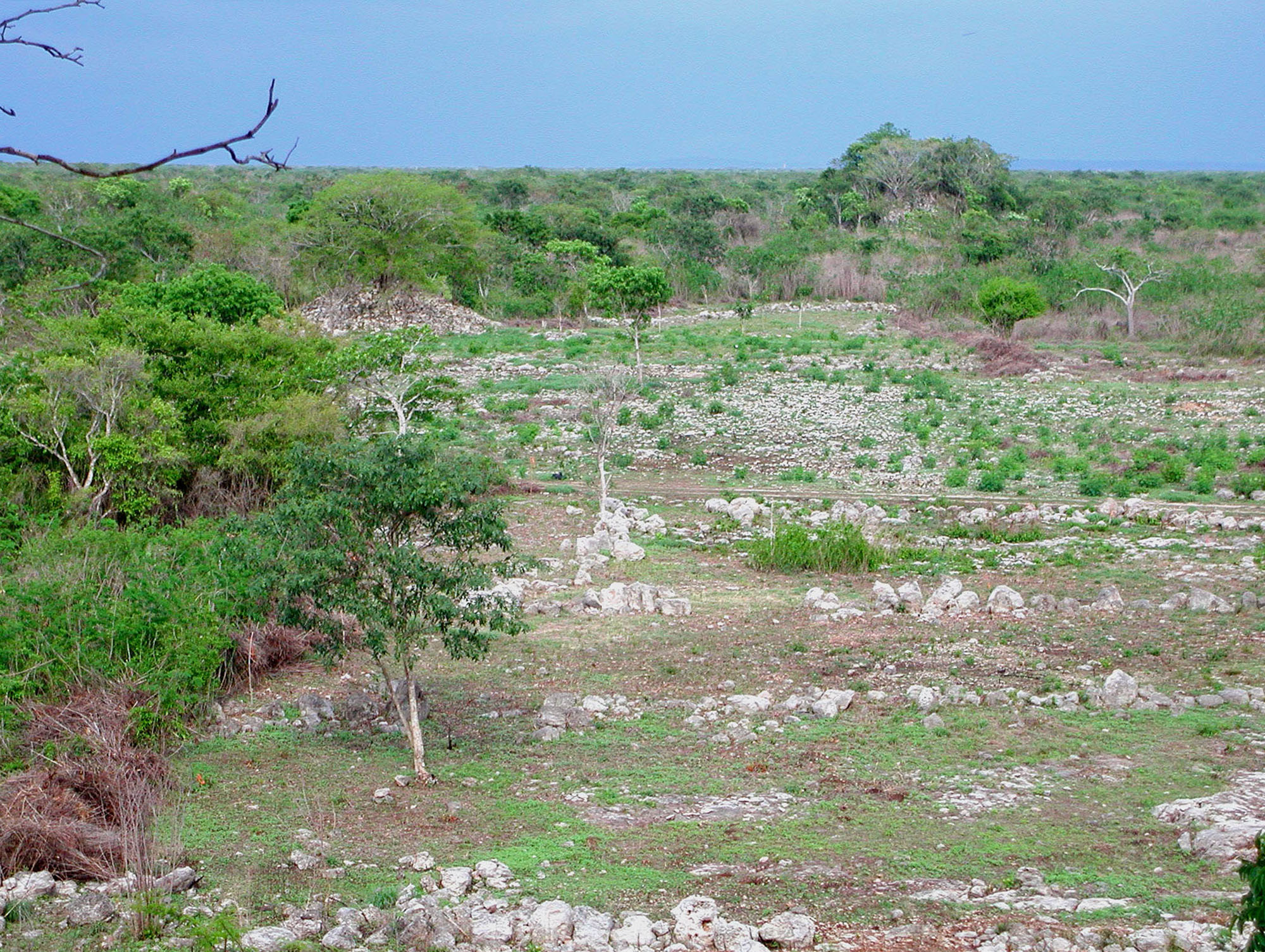
View of market area and surrounding landscape, Chunchucmil.

The site of Chunchucmil is also notable for the likely presence of a marketplace. Geochemical soil tests combined with careful excavations of an open area in the site center have revealed a possible market for distributing comestibles and other goods. Excavations also revealed ephemeral stone alignments that may have been brace foundations for perishable market stall walls. High levels of phosphorus correlate with these alignments, suggesting high concentrations of organic decay. Additionally, the distribution of obsidian within the Chunchucmil region itself, especially among a variety of sociocultural contexts, may also indicate the presence of a market economy, which is relatively rare among Early Classic Maya economies.

=== Subsistence ===
As mentioned above, one important question concerning ancient Chunchucmil is how such a large population could have survived in one of the poorest areas for agriculture. According to bone isotope studies conducted by Pakbeh Regional Economy Project member Geni Mansell, the diet of the ancient inhabitants may have been more diversified than in other areas of the Maya region. When compared with skeletal remains from other parts of Yucatán, Belize and the southern Maya lowlands, human remains from Chunchucmil indicate that their diet included significantly less corn (maize, the staple crop for most communities in the Maya area). Access to the more ecologically diverse wetlands and coastal resources, as well as access to inter-regional trade routes and a centralized marketplace, may have been critical to ancient subsistence at Chunchucmil.

== See also ==
- Maya architecture
- List of Maya Sites
