= Hacienda Kochol =

- Location in Mexico
- Coordinates: 20°37′12″N 90°09′34″W
- Country: Mexico
- Mexican States: Yucatán
- Municipalities: Maxcanú
- Time zone: UTC−6 (CST)
  - Summer (DST): UTC−5 (CDT)
- Postal code: 97804
- Area code: 997

Hacienda Kochol is located in the Maxcanú Municipality in the state of Yucatán in southeastern Mexico. It is one of the properties that arose during the nineteenth century henequen boom. After a foreclosure in the 1950s and use for many years as a bank's storage facility, the building is uninhabitable and neglected.

== Toponymy ==
The name (Kochol) is a word from the Mayan language meaning "mosquito".

== How to get there ==
From the south side of the Pereférico of Mérida, go south toward Campeche on highway 180, approximately 52 km to Maxcanú. Take Calle 15 west for approximately 15 km to Hacienda Kochol.

== History ==
Throughout the nineteenth century, the estate belonged to descendants of the Lara family. Including Lara Ferré, Lara Bolio and Lara O´Horán. In the late 1930s, Mercedes Lara transferred the property to her son, Luis O'Horán Lara. He lost the property in a foreclosure in the 1950s and it was purchased by the bank. For many years after the foreclosure, the principal house was used as a storage facility by Banco Nacional de Crédito Rural (BANRURAL).

== Architecture ==
When the hacienda was functioning, the compound consisted of the main house, the chapel, the company store, the foreman's home, and the powerhouse, or building in which the machinery operated. All of the buildings were grouped around the rectangular principal park and the workers lived on the grounds in typical Maya-style houses.

The principal house was reached either from a causeway from the nearby pueblo and the other from the north by way of the powerhouse. In typical colonial style, the main house had large porches. A span of arches, supported by stone columns flank the porch above which is featured a split pediment.

The powerhouse features a similar style by is more austere than the main house. The building is divided into three parts. The center section features a double archway and pediment. The scraping machinery is located parallel to the building allowing passage of platforms to the storage elevator.

== Demographics ==
All of the henequen plantations ceased to exist as autonomous communities with the agrarian land reform implemented by President Lazaro Cardenas in 1937. His decree turned the haciendas into collective ejidos, leaving only 150 hectares to the former landowners for use as private property. Figures before 1937 indicate populations living on the farm. After 1937, figures indicate those living in the community, as the remaining Hacienda Kochol houses only the owner's immediate family.

According to the 2005 census conducted by the INEGI, the population of the city was 1498 inhabitants, of whom 762 were men and 736 were women.

Population of Kochol by year
Year	1900	1910	1921	1930	1940	1950	1960	1970	1980	1990	1995	2000	2005
Population	319	406	424	480	416	370	473	564	866	1131	1237	1270	1498

== Bibliography ==
- Bracamonte, P and Solís, R., Los espacios de autonomía maya, Ed. UADY, Mérida, 1997.
- Gobierno del Estado de Yucatán, "Los municipios de Yucatán", 1988.
- Kurjack, Edward y Silvia Garza, Atlas arqueológico del Estado de Yucatán, Ed. INAH, 1980.
- Patch, Robert, La formación de las estancias y haciendas en Yucatán durante la colonia, Ed. UADY, 1976.
- Peón Ancona, J. F., "Las antiguas haciendas de Yucatán", en Diario de Yucatán, Mérida, 1971.
