= Maxcanú =

Town in the Mexican state of Yucatán

Coordinates: 20°35′N 89°59′W

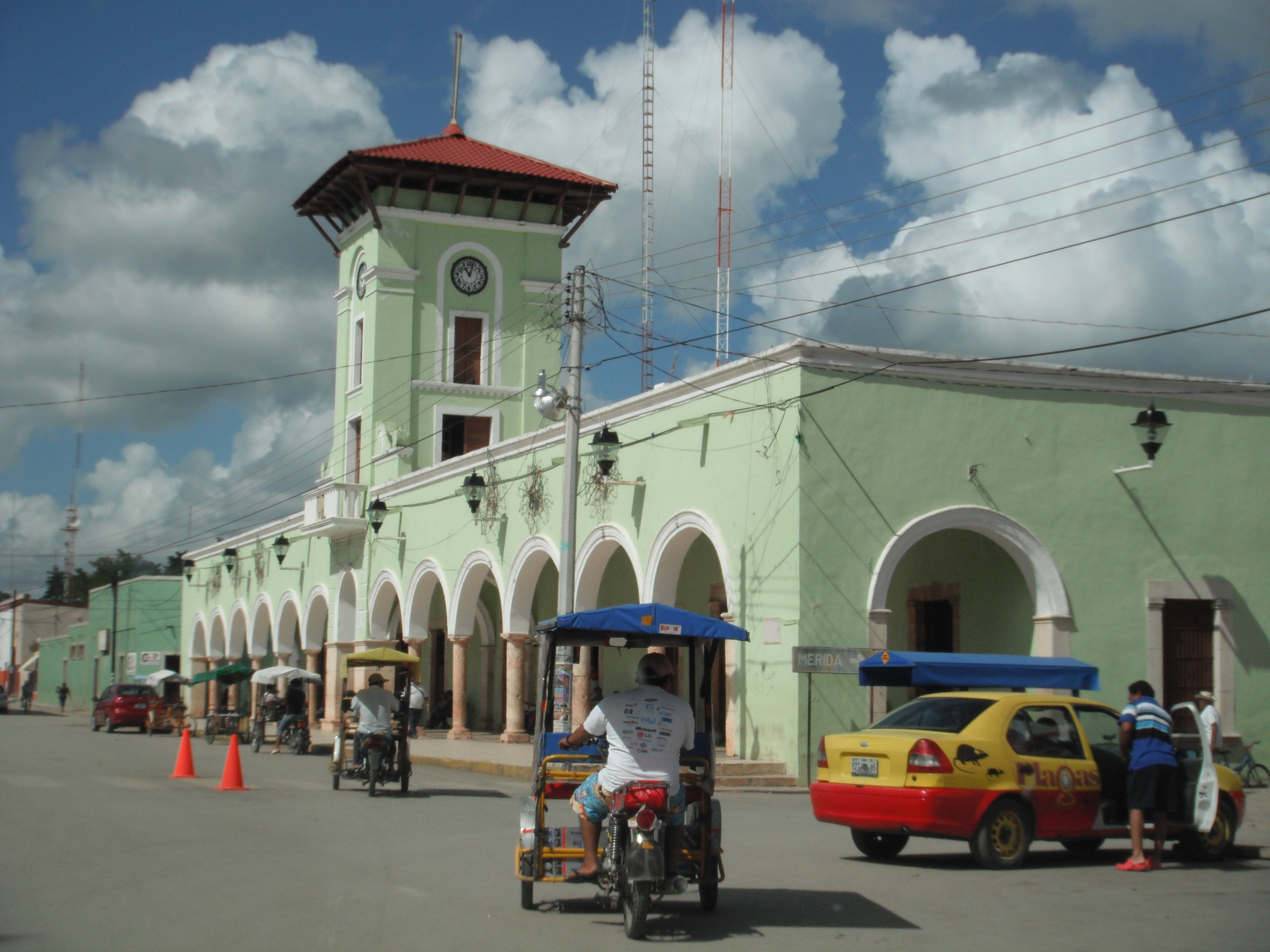
Maxcanú, 2011

Maxcanú is a large town in the western part of the Mexican state of Yucatán; it also functions as the seat for the Maxcanú Municipality. It is located on Federal Highway 180, approximately 62 km (39 mi) south of Mérida.

The ancient Maya site of Oxkintok and the caves of Calcehtok are close to Maxcanú, while another ancient Maya settlement, Chunchucmil, is located ca. 25 kilometers west of the town.

Facilities available in Maxcanú include: internet cafes; grocery stores; fresh produce market; family restaurants; public telephones; hardware stores; bus station (for connections to Mérida and Campeche); and a "combi" taxi stand for travelling to local villages. Maxcanú railway station on the Tren Maya is just outside of town.

== Geography ==
The town is located on Federal Highway 180, approximately 62 km (39 mi) south of Mérida.

=== Climate ===
Climate data for Maxcanú
Month	Jan	Feb	Mar	Apr	May	Jun	Jul	Aug	Sep	Oct	Nov	Dec	Year
Mean daily maximum °C (°F)	29.7 (85.5)	31.4 (88.5)	34.1 (93.4)	35.9 (96.6)	36.7 (98.1)	35.5 (95.9)	35 (95)	34.6 (94.3)	33.8 (92.8)	32 (90)	31.0 (87.8)	29.6 (85.3)	33.3 (91.9)
Mean daily minimum °C (°F)	16.2 (61.2)	17.3 (63.1)	19.1 (66.4)	21.0 (69.8)	22.4 (72.3)	22.7 (72.9)	22.4 (72.3)	22.0 (71.6)	22.0 (71.6)	20.9 (69.6)	18.8 (65.8)	17.3 (63.1)	20.2 (68.4)
Average precipitation mm (inches)	28 (1.1)	28 (1.1)	18 (0.7)	25 (1)	110 (4.5)	170 (6.7)	160 (6.4)	170 (6.7)	190 (7.6)	120 (4.7)	48 (1.9)	41 (1.6)	1,120 (43.9)
Source: Weatherbase

== Notable people ==
Maxcanú is the birthplace of Alfredo Barrera Vásquez, the noted Mexican anthropologist and Mayanist scholar who was the principal editor behind the Diccionario Maya Cordemex, the influential Mayan-Spanish dictionary and orthography.
