= Maxcanú Municipality =

Municipality in the Mexican state of Yucatán

Maxcanú
- Municipality
- Region 1 Poniente #048

- Location within Mexico
- Coordinates: 20°36′N 89°54′W
- Country: Mexico
- State: Yucatán

Government
  - Type: 2012–2015
  - Municipal President: Camilo Delelys May Cauich

Area
  - Total: 1,320.82 km^{2} (509.97 sq mi)

Population (2005)
  - Total: 21,704
- Time zone: UTC-6 (Central Standard Time)
- INEGI Code: 048
- Major Airport: Merida (Manuel Crescencio Rejón) International Airport
- IATA Code: MID
- ICAO Code: MMMD

Maxcanú Municipality (in the Yucatec Maya language: "his four monkeys") is a municipality in the Mexican state of Yucatán. Its seat is the town of Maxcanú. The municipality covers an area of approximately 1,321 km^{2} and is located roughly 52 km southwest of the city of Mérida.

== Geography ==
The municipality covers an area of approximately 1,321 km2 and is located roughly 52 km southwest of the city of Mérida.

It shares borders with the following adjacent municipalities:

- Celestún, Samahíl, and Kinchil to the north,
- Chocholá, Kopomá, and Opichén to the east, and
- Halachó to the south. A small portion of its southern border is also shared with the state of Campeche.

== History ==
Maxcanú Municipality belonged to the chieftainship of Ah-Canul prior to the conquest. After the Spanish arrived, the area was organized as an encomienda. In 1734, the encomendero was José Domingo Pardío, who was charged with 256 native inhabitants.

In 1821, Yucatán was declared independent of the Spanish Crown. In 1825 the area was part of the Camino Real Bajo region, with its headquarters in Hunucmá. In 1847, as part of the Caste War of Yucatán, the state government passed laws for public flogging of Indians who might be conspiring against the Spanish. The local Indian headman and 200 natives were beaten.

In 1900, Maxcanú was listed as a Villa and head of the pueblo of Kopomá and two rural farms Nupilá and San Isidro. In 1921, Nupilá withdrew, in 1925 San Isidro withdrew, and in 1935, Kopomá and the farm "Kobnochacan" withdrew and a new municipality was organized.

== Governance ==
The municipal president is elected for a term of three years. The president appoints nine Councilpersons to serve on the board for three-year terms, as the Secretary and councilors heritage and patrimony, public services, public security, commissaries and ecology, urban development, rural development, public monuments, markets and health, and parks and public gardens.

The Municipal Council administers the business of the municipality. It is responsible for budgeting and expenditures and producing all required reports for all branches of the municipal administration. Annually it determines educational standards for schools.

The Police Commissioners ensure public order and safety. They are tasked with enforcing regulations, distributing materials and administering rulings of general compliance issued by the council.

== Communities ==
The head of the municipality is Maxcanú. Within its municipal jurisdiction are included Hacienda Canzote, Chactún, Chan Chocholá, Hacienda Ché, Chunchucmil, Coahuilá, Cochol, Hacienda Crucero Copop, Granada, Kanachén, Hacienda Memu, Paraíso, San Fernando, San Rafael, Santa Rosa, Santo Domingo, Hacienda Simón, Sombrilla, Hacienda Xamail, and Hacienda Xlam Riti. The major population areas are shown below:

Community	Population
Entire Municipality (2010)	21,704
Chunchucmil	941 in 2005
Cochol	1498 in 2005
Kanachén	338 in 2005
Maxcanú	12387 in 2005
Paraíso	597 in 2005
Santa Rosa	874 in 2005
Santo Domingo	1159 in 2005

== Landmarks ==
=== Archaeological ===
A temple dedicated to Our Lady of Mount Caramel that was built in the seventeenth century and two chapels, the first in honor of St. Michael the Archangel and the second at the Three Crosses; and three former haciendas Kochol called Santo Domingo, Grenada and Santa Rosa.

- Hacienda Kochol

=== Prehispanic ===
There is an archaeological site located near Chunchucmil, bearing the same name.

== See also ==
- Municipalities of Yucatán
