= Oxkintok =

Classical Mayan archaeological site in Yucatán, México

Coordinates: 20°33′37″N 89°57′14″W

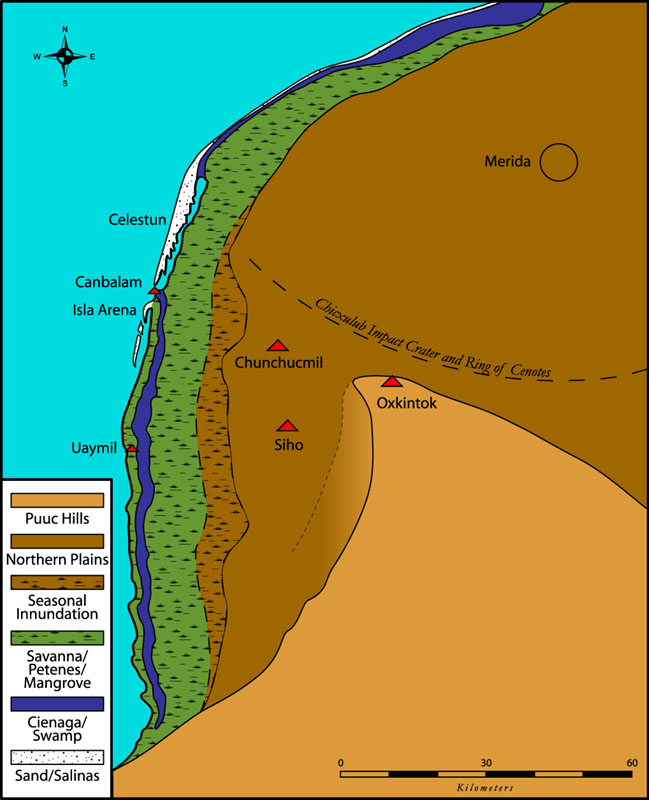
Map of NW Yucatán, showing major ecological zones and the location of Oxkintok

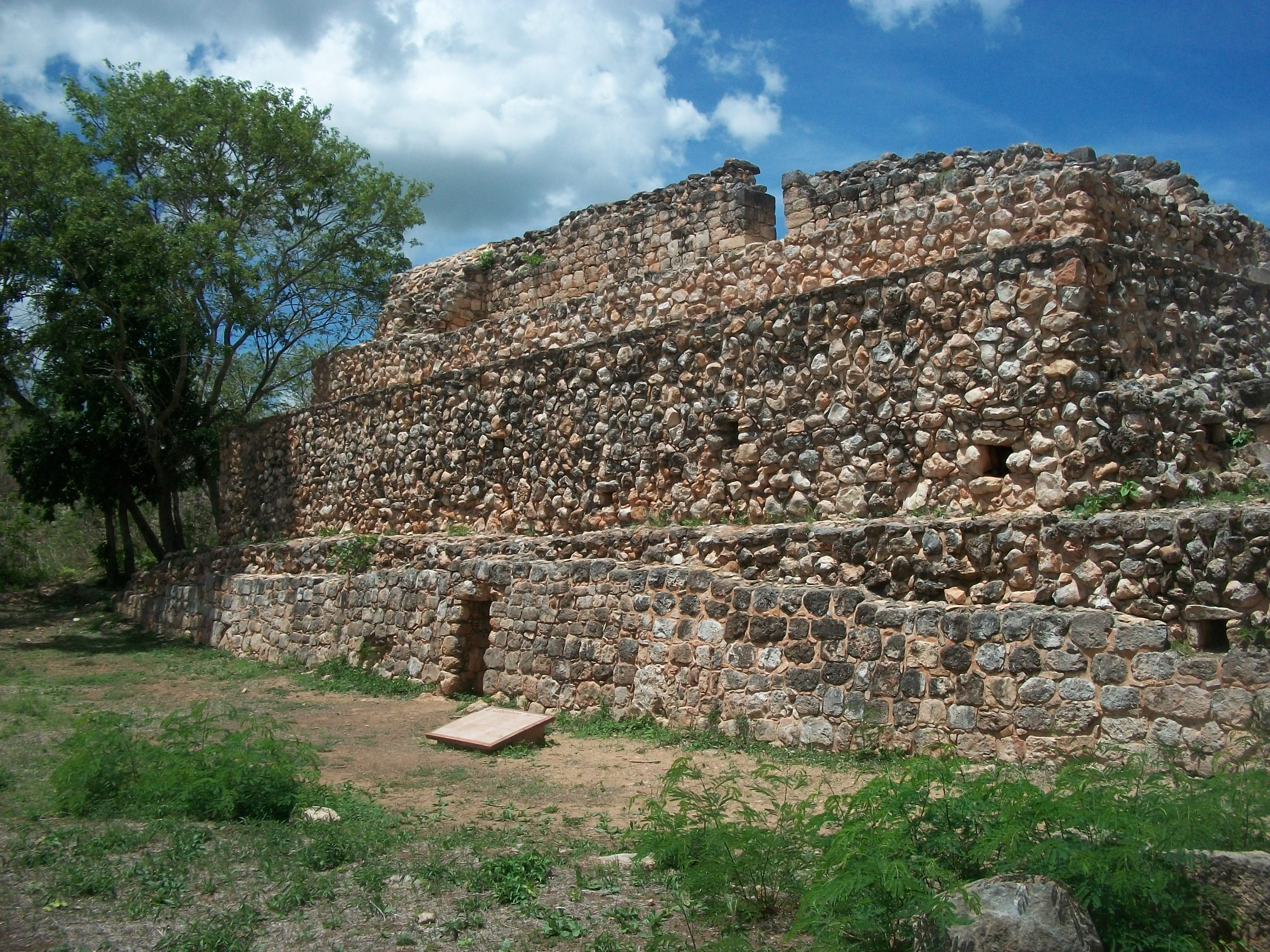
Tzat Tun Tzat or "ancient labyrinth".

Oxkintok is a pre-Columbian Maya archaeological site in the Puuc region of Yucatán state, in southeastern Mexico.

== Etymology ==
In the Yucatec Maya language, the name "Oxkintok" can be parsed as "Ox" (three) and "Kin" (day/sun), but there are multiple possibilities for "Tok" (if the final letter is a soft /K/ then it may mean "snatch away / defend, lean, fall, or burn", but if the final letter is truly a glottalized /K’/ then it may mean "puncture, let blood, or chert / flint / hard stone"). Different translations, based upon the various meanings of "Tok" are found in the literature. The term ox-kin also means 'unfinished'. Different sources suggest the name could mean 'three suns of stone', 'three days of flint', 'stone of three suns', 'three cutting suns', 'burned in three days' or 'punctured by flint'.

== Geography and climate ==
The site of Oxkintok is located in the northwestern Yucatán Peninsula, and is situated uncharacteristically (for the region) near two other sites. Oxkintok lies six kilometers southeast from Maxcanu, 46 kilometers northeast of Uxmal, and 50 kilometers south of the current state capital city of Mérida. It lies in the Puuc region; puuc is the Mayan word for "hill". The Puuc hills extend from the southern Yucatán up to Campeche in the north and Quintana Roo in the west. These are the limits of the karstic hills in the otherwise flat landscape of the Yucatán.

The Yucatán is an extensive, limestone rich plains region that is dominated by karst topography and geology. Being karst landscape is significant, as no surface water is present. This means no major river systems and hardly any lakes are present in the northern Yucatán as the limestone lithology drains subterraneously. Any surface water that is retained is unsuitable for consumption and occurs in very small amounts. The underground drainage results in the northern Yucatán being covered in caves and sinkholes called cenotes, which are subsequently used by the inhabitants to access drinkable ground water. Any relief in the Puuc region is due to unequal dissolution rates within the limestone bedrock, and never reaches 400 meters above sea level.

The northern Yucatán is rainy tropics with heavy summer rains, in most areas precipitation is upwards of 1000mm with a rainy and dry season. 80% of precipitation occurs in the months between May and October, with only moderate precipitation November to March. At the archaeological site of Oxkintok there is substantial rainfall of around 700mm. The temperatures of the peninsula are notably uniform, with an average of 25°C, with warmer temperatures towards the coast, and a continuous cooling towards the center.

== History of research ==
The site of Oxkintok was first described in the 16th century by Brother Antonio de Ciudad Real, who noted the proximity of the site to the Puuc mountain range and the large ruined structures. He was also first to make note of Satunsat "the place where they tossed those who had committed great offenses so that there they may die" (Torecilla, 1998). Afterwards the site isn't mentioned again until the 19th century when it's visited by J.L. Stephens (Torecilla, 1998). In 1842, John Lloyd Stephens and Frederick Catherwood explored Oxkintok, including The Labyrinth. In the early 20th century, under the Carnegie project, Edwin M. Shook spent a short time at the site. The first actual excavations were funded by the University of Pennsylvania and directed by H.E. Mercer in February 1895. These first investigations were focused on the architectural group of Satunsat. Between 1932 and 1940 the Carnegie institution of Washington funded a large project to collect data on many sites of the Yucatán peninsula (Torecilla, 1998). Oxkintok was studied by H.E.D Pollock, E.M. Shook and G.W. Brainerd with a focus heavily on architecture and ceramics during the 1940s but no large scale excavations took place. Since the 1980s a long-term project directed by Miguel Rivera Dorado (of Madrid, Spain) has produced a vast amount of data on Oxkintok. Most recently, Mexico's INAH has invested in excavations and reconstructions at the site (under the direction of Ricardo Velazquez Valadez).

The Oxkintok Project

The first large scale excavations at Oxkintok were conducted from 1986 to 1991 during the Oxkintok Project/M.A.E.M. (Mision Arcqueologica de Espana en Mexico) headed by Miguel Rivera Dorado. The goals of the excavations were twofold (Madrid, 1991).

- 1) Finish excavations at a site that suggest clues towards the social order of prehispanic Mayans.
- 2) Oxkintok provides clues to gaps in the evolution of the first civilizations in the Northern Yucatán.

This is by far the majority of the body of publications available as individual team members publish on Oxkintok.

== Chronology ==
The site has provided evidence of habitation from the Late Preclassic through the Late Postclassic periods of Maya prehistory. However, Oxkintok became a major center between the Early Classic and Terminal Classic periods (including what Carmen Varela terms the "Middle Classic"). It is well known as possessing a very early Long Count date in 475 CE (on the lintel of Structure 6 in the "Canul" group). The latest dated monument at the site records a date in 859 CE. In total there are about 70,000 pot sherds collected at Oxkintok, and 38 complete vessels. The chronology is largely based on pottery types that emerge and die out in Maya culture. However, there is ongoing debate within the excavation team about how to interpret the ceramics. The chronology that includes aspects aside from ceramics includes architecture and iconography.

Based on this model, there were six phases:

- Sihil, But, Ichpa, Noheb, Ukmul, Nak, and Tokoy.

The chronology of the site starts at ~600 BCE and lasts until ~1500 CE The first two phases are weakly defined and things don't solidify until the Ichpa phase, which lines up with the Early Classic Period and is consequently the first agreed upon phase. There is polychrome pottery characteristic of the region in that time period, and hieroglyphics. The Noheb phase lines up with the Middle Classic and during this period, polychrome pottery disappears along with any sort of stone inscriptions, and the construction of large pyramids begins. In the Ukmul phase, hieroglyphics re-emerge and there is an abundance of rich detailed iconography. The Nak phase is a high point, with the building of the most 'glamorous' architecture, and Pre-pizarran ceramics emerge, characterized by supporting conical feet but displaying a broad diversity in design otherwise. Finally the Tokoy phase is defined by a disappearance in all evidence of human activity, except for pottery with a deterioration in materials and in consistency in technique, which fades out completely towards 1500 CE.

There is no evidence that warfare or famine caused the abandonment of Oxkintok. Nor is there evidence for occupation after it was abandoned around 1500 CE.

== Architecture ==
The style of architecture is an interesting mix of Early, Late and Terminal Classic techniques. Some of the structures exhibit slab-vaulted masonry (indicative of the Early Classic and early Late Classic periods), while many quadrangles contain structures with veneer masonry (introduced at the end of the Late Classic and elaborated during the Terminal Classic period). The site is used as an example of the transition from traditional Classic Period architecture to Puuc Veneer masonry by George F. Andrews. Oxkintok also exhibits a type of "talud-tablero" architecture, most commonly associated with central Mexican sites such as Teotihuacan, Monte Albán and Cholula (but can also be found among certain Maya sites, such as Tikal, Kaminaljuyu and neighboring Chunchucmil, during the Middle Classic).

The architecture is best understood and is almost always broken up into four groups and then looking at how architecture changed or didn't change within those groups. The four groups are: May, Satunsat, and Ah Canul/Canul and Dzib. These groups make up the urban center, and are almost exclusively monumental architecture. They were defined by the excavation team and they're essentially just a cluster of buildings, or a building (Madrid, 1991). There's much more than just these four groups; the rest just hasn't been excavated really, since there was such a heavy focus on excavating monumental architecture. Most of what's been excavated at Oxkintok is temples, palaces, and multiroom structures. To trace the changes in architecture of the site, the above chart (Fig. 7) was compiled. It's a compilation of data from the three sources listed below figure 7. It is evident that there are many major changes between the three periods, and in general it's a transition from irregular design to a more elaborate, very planned out geometric design with decoration and complex stucco art and stone wrought decorations. One thing that remains consistent the use of domes and arches for entryways and open spaces. Concerning the individual groups, there's a concentration of Proto Puuc in the Ah-Canul group and Early Oxkintok in the May group that was later modified in the Proto Puuc phase, but no group is confined to one phase.

Satunsat

The most popular structure at the site is the tzat tun tzat (sometimes written Satunsat, but most commonly called "The Labyrinth"). The Satunsat group is an outlier. It's a single building, a sort of a maze or labyrinth, built to replicate a cave complex. There's no real guess as to what it was built for, though there was a recent discovery that most of the ventilation shafts line up with specific positions of the sun, so some think it was a maze used for initiation and practice of religion but there's nothing conclusive. So it's a little hard to place Satunsat into any one phase, but sources continuously point to a probability that this structure was built in the early Oxkintok phase.

In the VI century, one of the rooms of the lower floor was converted into a burial chamber with a reduced area of the labyrinth. The staircase to the third floor on the north side was also blocked, the painting of the north, east and south facades was replaced and a staircase was added to the east side. According to Miguel Rivera Dorado, this conversion marked the transformation of a specific semi-subterranean labyrinthine palace into an ordinary palace.

Sculpture

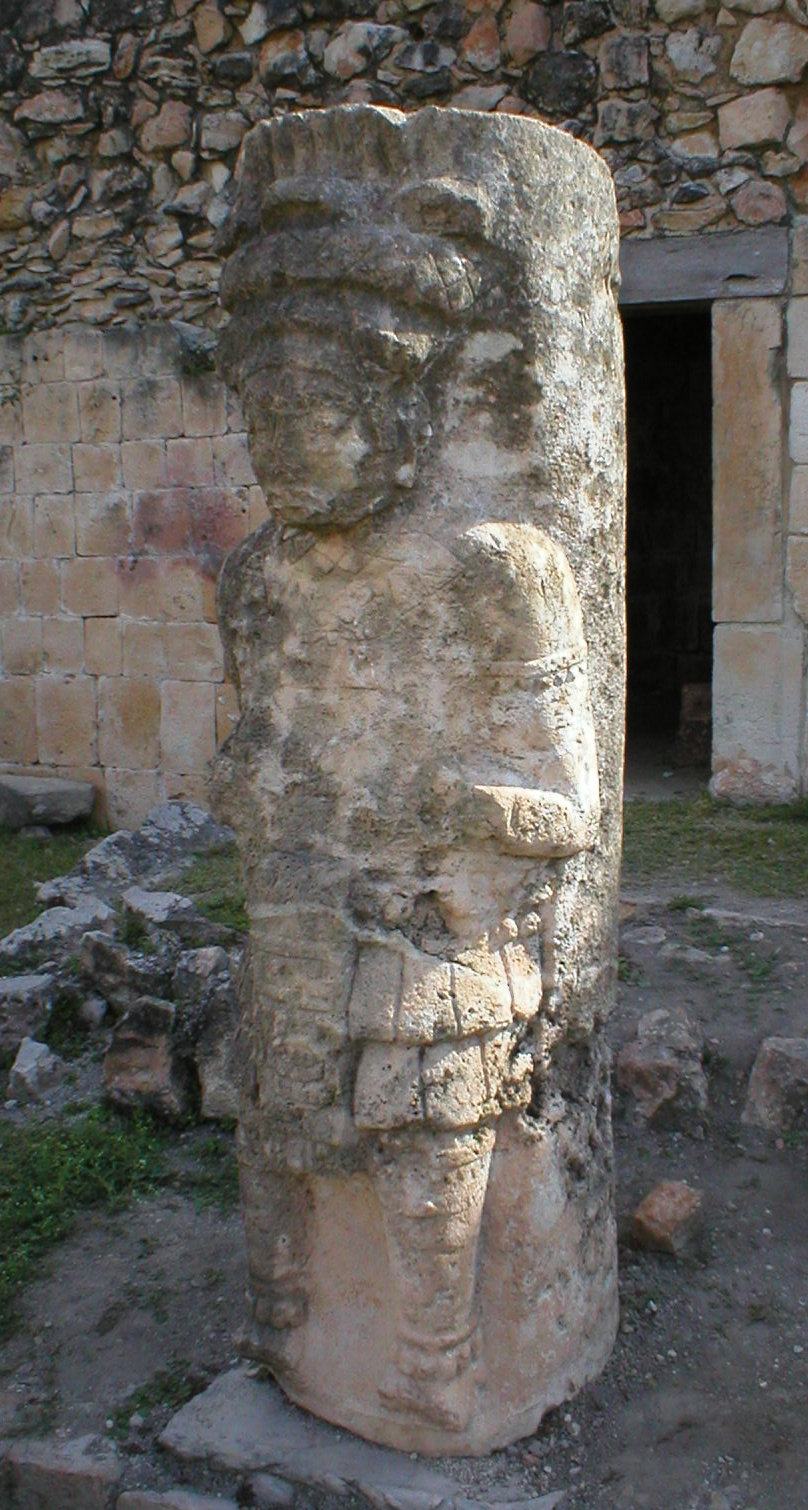
Carved column from Oxkintok, Yucatán

Oxkintok is well known for its anthropomorphic columns. These Late to Terminal Classic columns were sculpted to represent elites, warriors and deities – a potential precursor to the “warrior columns” of Chichen Itza and Mayapan. Notes on some of these columns were included in the pioneering work of Tatiana Proskouriakoff (see references, below).

=== Tombs ===
Due to the looting of Oxkintok, there are currently only 11 (though the number of intact tombs varies in the literature between 11 (Dorado) and 5 (Torecilla)) undisturbed tombs, almost all of which were very similar.

Tombs 1, 2, 3, 4, 5 dated to the Middle Classic, 6,7, to the transition between the Late and Middle Classic, 8, 9 and 10 belong to the late Classic and 11 is preliminarily dated to the terminal classic. There are no foreign burials, and the only burials that aren't of males are of undetermined sex. It does seem however that these burials were only of those of high status.

- Mostly Male Burials, with only three of unknown sex
- All individual burials aside from one mixed burial
- Secondary burials, with two primary
- Burial Chambers/graves within monumental Maya architecture
- Offerings varied little. Almost always included shell jewelry and fragments, jade mask and/or pendant fragments, few obsidian tools, and a form of tripod ceramics.

Bones

There many skeletal remains throughout site that aren't included in burials, and were either parts of offerings or have been intentionally deposited. Some of them are animal, but most are human. Many of the bones have signs of breakdown through arthritis, osteomieltisis (which is a bone marrow disease that leads to deterioration of the affected bones), and many of the teeth had severely worn down enamel.

== Religion and ideology ==
At Oxkintok, religion, government and architecture were closely tied together as was the case for Maya religion at most cities. Firstly it is clear that the northern half of the urban center was less important than the southern half, due to the lack of iconography and the presence of a ball court in the southern half. Of the three architectural groups of this southern half the Ah Canul group is considered to have been the center of power, with three monumental pyramids and connecting tunnels to the other groups. The Dzib group was specialized, possessing a ball court making it extremely important in the expression of social order, power relations, and legitimization of monarchy (Dorado, 1996). There is also a complex relationship described between the Mayan monarchy and the sun-god. It is accepted that the layout of Oxkintok is closely tied with the movements and patterns of the sun. Looking at the orientation of buildings, such as the facades of Satunsat that face east and west it is specially prepared for observing the solar equinox and trapping sunlight in the interior of the labyrinth (Dorado, 1996). The orientation of the ball court is also important as it faces north–south so that "the ball may imitate the annual itinerary of the sun in its comings and goings" (Dorado). Lastly, it is noted by Dorado (1996) that "we lack sufficiently complete maps of numerous cities, the looting and the elements have wiped out the clearest remains" but later concludes that the city itself was designed to represent the heavens The king in some reliefs holds up an emblem of the sky is considered to be connected to the sun-god who appears throughout the city in the kings works. In the Ah Canul group, effigies to the sun and the moon and images of the "governing family" referred to as Walas can still be seen, further interlinking these two aspects of Mayan culture at Oxkintok.

The ideology of construction

Dorado (1996) presents the idea that continual construction that took place at Oxkintok and other Maya sites is related to the symbolization of kinship ties and the cult of ancestors. Each successive ruler established ties to the "founding fathers" through stone works. Construction is the affirmation and expression of kinship ties and laws of stratification, so each building reaffirms a lineage, the memory of its existence and the justification of its power.

Leadership and inequality

Discussion of leadership and inequality revolves around the site's architecture as many of Oxkintok's excavations have been focused on the design of its urban center and its development during antiquity (Dorado, 1997). All of the burials were relatively well endowed with an unvarying set of grave goods and well designed structures, further suggesting that all of the burials were of higher status individuals. There is a burial that included a modified skull suggesting there was status differentiation, assuming Oxkintok followed the traditional Maya status practice of cranial deformation.

== Government structure ==
There is clear evidence of inequality and sources of power in Oxkintoks architecture. It is hard however to separate the government structure from what is known of the religion at Oxkintok: "The layout of the city seems to have been related to the movements of the sun and the political power of the leader (Manzanilla, 1997)". Religion, government, and to an extent inequality are best understood, and frequently discussed simultaneously through the lens of architecture.

A governing group deemed “Walas” has been preliminarily investigated at the sight, not much is known about them in particular, but they do show up frequently in the surviving iconography.

== Warfare and violence ==
Any wars that did occur, and any marriages for that matter, occurred between sites at an average distance of 38 km (Manzanilla, 1997). This brings the idea that there was violence at this site. Manzanilla (1997) also states the Dorado stresses the difficulty of maintaining widespread territorial control in the tropical rainforest and that strength is based on kinship ties. However, there are several key pieces of evidence missing for any further conclusions. The architecture does not suggest any preparation for warfare, through the lack of walls and other fortifications. It is hard to make any conclusions based on the burials described above due to the sheer lack of a data set. Furthermore, there are no written records of violence Oxkintok, nor are there evidences of tributes received/paid or of conquest. Through the lack of so many indicators of violence and warfare, it isn't unreasonable to conclude that Oxkintok was not frequently involved in large scale violence.

== Writing and symbolism ==
Most of the information on the writing at Oxkintok comes from the Dzib architectural group. The group includes the previously mentioned ball court, two staircases, and 18 stelae that all include some form of iconography. The stelae at the site are illegible/uninterpretable do to advanced erosion and deterioration, but can be without doubt placed in the late classic period by other characteristics (Dorado, 1996). The first staircase has not been fully interpreted, but is assumed to be concurrent to the second staircase and therefore similar in meaning. The second set of stairs mentions the Walas government, and seems to be dedicated to it. A calendar wheel that has not been fully interpreted but seems to be connected to the ball court ring, as they start on the same date, is also present. The ball court ring is inscribed with the date it was presumably constructed, 713–714 AD. It is possible that more writing/iconography was not preserved due to the natural tendency of the building material (karstic limestone and sandstone) to weather rapidly relative to other building materials. It is also important to note that there was a conspicuous "hiatus" of writing at Oxkintok during a boom in architectural contraction at the site, 550-650AD (Dorado, 1996). Interpretation of this hiatus has not been presented.

== Modern site and tourism ==
The site of Oxkintok is a protected “zona”, open to visitors with an admission fee. It is accessible from the nearby town of Maxcanú, approximately 62 km (38.5 mi) south of Mérida on Federal Highway 180. The site lacks facilities, but is attended by guides. Nearby attractions include the Calcehtok caves.

== Bibliography ==
- Andrews, George F. (1999) Pyramids, Palaces, Monsters and Masks: The Golden Age of Maya Architecture. Labyrinthos Press, Culvert City.
- Cosme Munoz, Alfonso. 1989 Laberintos, Piramides y Palacios las Fases Arquitectonicas de la Ciudad de Oxkintok, Ministerio de Cultura, Direccion General de Bellas Artes y Archivos, 1987–1990 3:99–111.
- Kelly, Joyce (1993) An Archaeological Guide to Mexico's Yucatán Peninsula. University of Oklahoma Press, Norman.
- Proskouriakoff, Tatiana (1950) A Study of Classic Maya Sculpture. Carnegie Institute of Washington Publication No. 593.
- Rivera Dorado, Miguel (1994) Notas de arqueología de Oxkintok. In Hidden Among the Hills: Maya Archaeology of the Northwest Yucatán Península. Hanns J. Prem, ed. pp. 44–58 Acta Mesoamericana, 7 Verlag von Flemming, Möckmühl.
- Rivera Dorado, Miguel (1999) La emergencia del estado maya de Oxkintok. Mayab 12:71–78 Madrid.
- Rivera Dorado, Miguel (2001) Oxkintok (Yucatán, Mexico). In Archaeology of Ancient Mexico and Central America: An Encyclopedia. Susan T. Evans and David L. Webster, eds. pp. 561–562. Garland, New York
- Shook, Edwin M. (1940) (English) Exploration in the ruins of Oxkintok, Yucatán. Revista mexicana de estudios antropológicos 4:165–171. Mexico
- Shook, Edwin M. (1983) (Spanish) Exploración en las ruinas de Oxkintok, Yucatán. Revista mexicana de estudios antropológicos 29(1):203–210. Mexico
- Stephens, John L. (1962) Incidents of Travel in Yucatán (2 vol.). University of Oklahoma Press, Norman
- Varela Torrecilla, Carmen (1990) Un nuevo complejo en la secuencia cerámica de Oxkintok: El Clásico Medio. Oxkintok 3:113–126. Madrid
- Varela Torrecilla, Carmen (1992) La cerámica de Oxkintok. Mayab 8:39–45. Madrid
- Varela Torrecilla, Carmen, and Geoffrey E. Braswell (2003) Teotihuacan and Oxkintok: new perspectives from Yucatán.In The Maya and Teotihuacan: Reinterpreting Early Classic Interaction, edited by G. E. Braswell, pp. 249–272. University of Texas Press, Austin.
- Dorado Rivera, Miguel 1996 Los Mayas De Oxkintok. Ministerio de Educaciâon y Cultura, Direccion General de Bellas Artes y Bienes Culturales, Instituto del Patrimonio Historico Espanol, Spain.
- Dorado Rivera, Miguel 1997 Arqueologia y etnografia en Oxkintok. Revista Española de Antropología Americana 27:113–127.
- Dorado Rivera, Miguel 1995 Arquitectura, gobernantes y cosmologia: Anotaciones sobre ideologia maya en los cudernos de Oxikintok. Revista Española de Antropología Americana 25:23–40.
- Dorado Rivera, Miguel 1998 El urbanismo de Oxkitok: Problemas e interpretaciones. Revista Española de Antropología Americana 28:39–61.
- Dorado Rivera, Miguel 1999 La emergencia del estado maya de Oxkintok. Sociedad Espanola de Estudios Mayas 12:71–78.
- Marqínez, M. Yolanda F., and Alfonso M. Cosme 1993 Estilos arquitectónicos y estadios constructivos en el grupo May, Oxkintok, Yucatán. Revista Española de Antropología Americana 23:67–82.
- Manzanilla, Linda (editor)1997 Emergence and Change in Early Urban Societies. Universidad Nacional Autónoma de México, México.
- Torrecilla Vare, Carmen 1996 La secuencia historica de Oxkintok: Problemas cronologicos y metodologicos desde el punto de vista de la ceramica. Revista Española de Antropología Americana 26:29–55.
- Torrecilla Vare, Carmen 1998 El Clasico Medio en el Noroccidente de Yucatán: La fase Oxkintok Regional en Oxkintok (Yucatán) como paradigma. Paris Monographs in American Archaeology 2
