= Halachó Municipality =

Municipality in the Mexican state of Yucatán

Halachó Yucatan
- Municipality
- Region 1 Poniente #033

- Location within Mexico
- Coordinates: 20°29′0″N 90°05′0″W
- Country: Mexico
- State: Yucatán

Government
  - Type: 2012–2015
  - Municipal President: Maria Cecilia Abraham Hoyos

Area
  - Total: 671.91 km^{2} (259.43 sq mi)

Population (2005)
  - Total: 18,125
- Time zone: UTC-6 (Central Standard Time)
- INEGI Code: 033
- Major Airport: Merida (Manuel Crescencio Rejón) International Airport
- IATA Code: MID
- ICAO Code: MMMD

Halachó Municipality (Spanish pronunciation: [xa.laˈtʃo], in the Yucatec Maya language: “Place of the rat's wattle”) is a municipality in the Mexican state of Yucatán containing 671.91 km^{2} of land and located roughly 68 km southwest of the city of Mérida.

== History ==
The area belonged to the chieftainship of Ah-Canul the mid-fifteenth century and after the conquest was designated as an encomienda to Gaspar Pacheco in 1549. In 1644 the encomedero of Halachó was Juan Quijada Rosado, but in 1659 it had been taken over by Cristóbal de Contreras by virtue of his marriage to Francisca Dorantes Solís, who belonged to an influential family. In 1700, the encomendero was Jacinto de Almeida, but by 1740 the Doña Ignacia del Castillo y Solis was in possession of the encomienda Halachó. with the charge for 168 Indians. It then passed to Don Pedro Cepeda y Lira.

In 1821, Yucatán was declared independent of the Spanish Crown. In 1825 the area was part of the Camino Real Bajo, with its headquarters in Hunucmá. By 1875, Halachó was elevated to the category of a town, but by 1921 it was reclassified as a village. Since 1910, the town of Halachó has contained two peoples, those who descend from Cepeda and those who descend from Cuch Holoch.

== Governance ==
The municipal president is elected for a term of three years. The president appoints nine Councilpersons to serve on the board for three year terms, as the Secretary and councilors of villages, special events, education, culture and sports, street lighting, health and welfare, city image, market and supply, public works, public monuments, and nomenclature.

The Municipal Council administers the business of the municipality. It is responsible for budgeting and expenditures and producing all required reports for all branches of the municipal administration. Annually it determines educational standards for schools.

The Police Commissioners ensure public order and safety. They are tasked with enforcing regulations, distributing materials and administering rulings of general compliance issued by the council.

== Communities ==
The seat of the municipality is in Halachó. The municipality is made up of 8 larger communities and 5 small ones. The small communities are Hala, Hacienda Santa Julia, San José, Tanchí, and Xocchel. The larger ones are:

Community	Population
Entire Municipality (2010)	19,072
Cepeda	2850 in 2005
Chucholoch	2040 in 2005
Dzidzibachi	722 in 2005
Halachó	9045 in 2005
Kancabchén	421 in 2005
San Mateo	265 in 2005
Santa María Acú	1349 in 2005
Sihó	1386 in 2005

== Local festivals ==
Annually a festival to the Virgen de Santa Ana is held from 13 to 17 April; from 19 July to 4 August is a festival in honor of St. James the Apostle; and the local fiesta is held the last week of November each year.

== Landmarks ==
=== Architectural ===
- St. James Church, in the municipal seat of Halachó, erected in the sixteenth century.
- Hacienda Chunchucmil
- Hacienda Kochol
- Hacienda Santa Maria Acu

=== Archaeological ===
- Siho Oxkintok archeological site

== See also ==
- Municipalities of Yucatán
