= Dzidzantún =

- Town
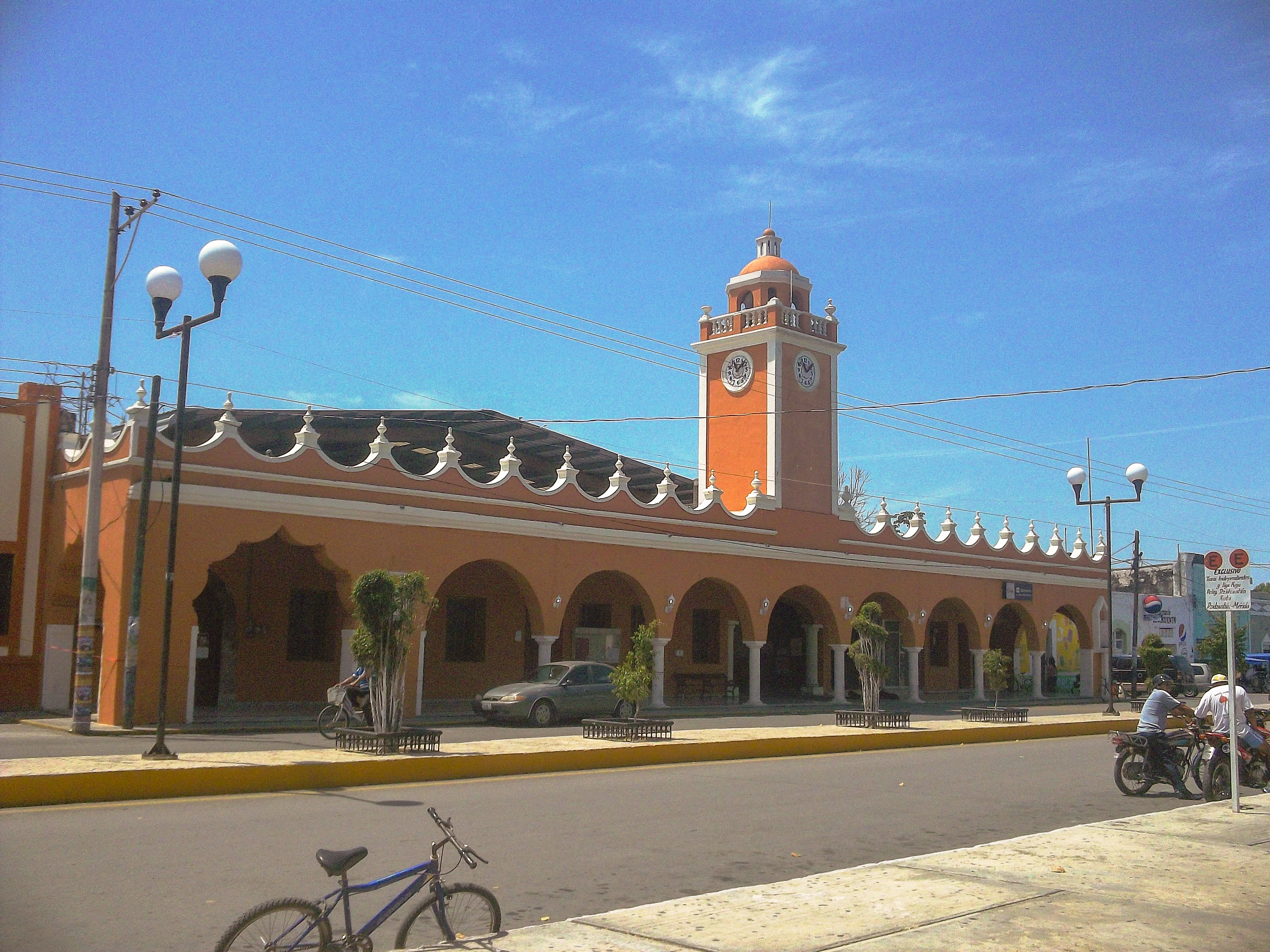
- Municipal Palace of Dzidzantún

- Location of the Town in the State of Yucatán

- Location of the Town in Mexico
- Coordinates: 21°14′50″N 89°2′30″W
- Country: Mexico
- State: Yucatán

Government
  - Mayor: ÁNGEL RODOLFO GUERRERO VIVAS

Area
  - Total: 198 km^{2} (76 sq mi)
- Elevation: 10 m (33 ft)

Population (2020)
  - Total: 8,345
  - Density: 42.1/km^{2} (109/sq mi)
  - Demonym: Dzidzantunence
- town
- Time zone: UTC-6 (Central Standard Time)
- Postal code: 97500
- Area code: 991
- INEGI Code: 027
- Major Airport: Merida (Manuel Crescencio Rejón) International Airport
- IATA Code: MID
- ICAO Code: MMMD
- Website: Official Website

Dzidzantún is a town in Mexico in the northeastern Yucatan, which serves as the headquarters of the municipio or administrative unit of the Dzidzantún Municipality.

== Geography ==
This town is in the coastal region known as the northern Gulf of Mexico. It falls within the parallel 21° 12' and 21° 23' latitude north and between 88° 57' and 89° 04' west longitude and has an average height of 4 meters.

It is bounded on the north by the Gulf of Mexico, south to the cities of Temax and Cansahcab, east to the town of Dzilam Gonzalez and to the west of the town of Yobaín.

=== Climate ===
Climate data for Dzidzantún
Month	Jan	Feb	Mar	Apr	May	Jun	Jul	Aug	Sep	Oct	Nov	Dec	Year
Mean daily maximum °C (°F)	32.4 (90.3)	33.7 (92.7)	34.7 (94.5)	35.3 (95.5)	36.2 (97.2)	35.8 (96.4)	35.8 (96.4)	35.9 (96.6)	35.6 (96.1)	34.8 (94.6)	33.2 (91.8)	32.7 (90.9)	34.7 (94.5)
Mean daily minimum °C (°F)	18.5 (65.3)	19.5 (67.1)	20.2 (68.4)	20.6 (69.1)	21.5 (70.7)	21.8 (71.2)	21.9 (71.4)	22.1 (71.8)	21.9 (71.4)	21.3 (70.3)	19.9 (67.8)	18.8 (65.8)	20.7 (69.3)
Average precipitation mm (inches)	30 (1.2)	30 (1.2)	25 (1)	18 (0.7)	53 (2.1)	110 (4.3)	100 (4)	110 (4.3)	130 (5.2)	110 (4.2)	41 (1.6)	43 (1.7)	800 (31.6)
Source: Weatherbase

== Demographics ==
As of 2020, there were 8,345 people residing in the town. Of the total population, 50.5% (4,211) were male and 49.5% (4,134) were female. The largest age ranges were 15 to 19 years old (676 inhabitants; 8.1%), 45 to 49 years old (627 inhabitants; 7.5%), and 20 to 24 years old (621 inhabitants; 7.4%). In the town, 416 inhabitants (5.0%) speak indigenous languages with 414 inhabitants speaking Maya and 2 inhabitants speaking Mam.

== History ==
Before the Spanish conquest, the site where the town of Dzidzantún now stands was part of the lands under the chieftainship of Ah Kin Chel. After the area was conquered by the Spaniards, an encomienda was established in 1549, granting Hernán Muñoz Vaquiano use over the lands in the area in exchange for taking care of the indigenous people who lived here. Yucatán declared its independence from the Spanish Crown in 1821 and in 1825, the town was assigned to the Temax Municipality. In 1918, the Dzidzantún Municipality was created, with the town of Dzidzantún as the headquarters of the administration.

== Festivals and culture ==
Festivals observed in the town include:

- Festivities in honor of Santa Clara, taking place in January.
- June 10–13, a festival in honor of San Antonio de Padua, patron of the people.
- August 8–14, a festival in honor of Santa Clara, patron of the people (August 11).

During festivals, it is the custom for women to use simple Huipil, highlighting the embroidered square neck and cutting edge clothing. This is placed over the shaft, which is subject to a ripple bottom half at the waist with a girdle of the same fabric; fitted sandals and sun protection are covered with a shawl. Farmers, especially the elderly, are dressed in baggy trousers, blankets, raw abotonada front shirts, apron Cotia and straw hats.

For major events and Vaquerías women wear a Terno dress, made of fine fabrics, lace and embroidery generally made by hand in a cross stitch. This is supplemented with long gold chains, earrings, coral beads or watermark rebozo and Santa Maria.

The men wear white trousers made of straight cut Philippine fine cloth, hats, sandals and Jipijapa, as well as the traditional red scarf bandana popularly known as essential to the Jarana dance.

== Photo gallery ==
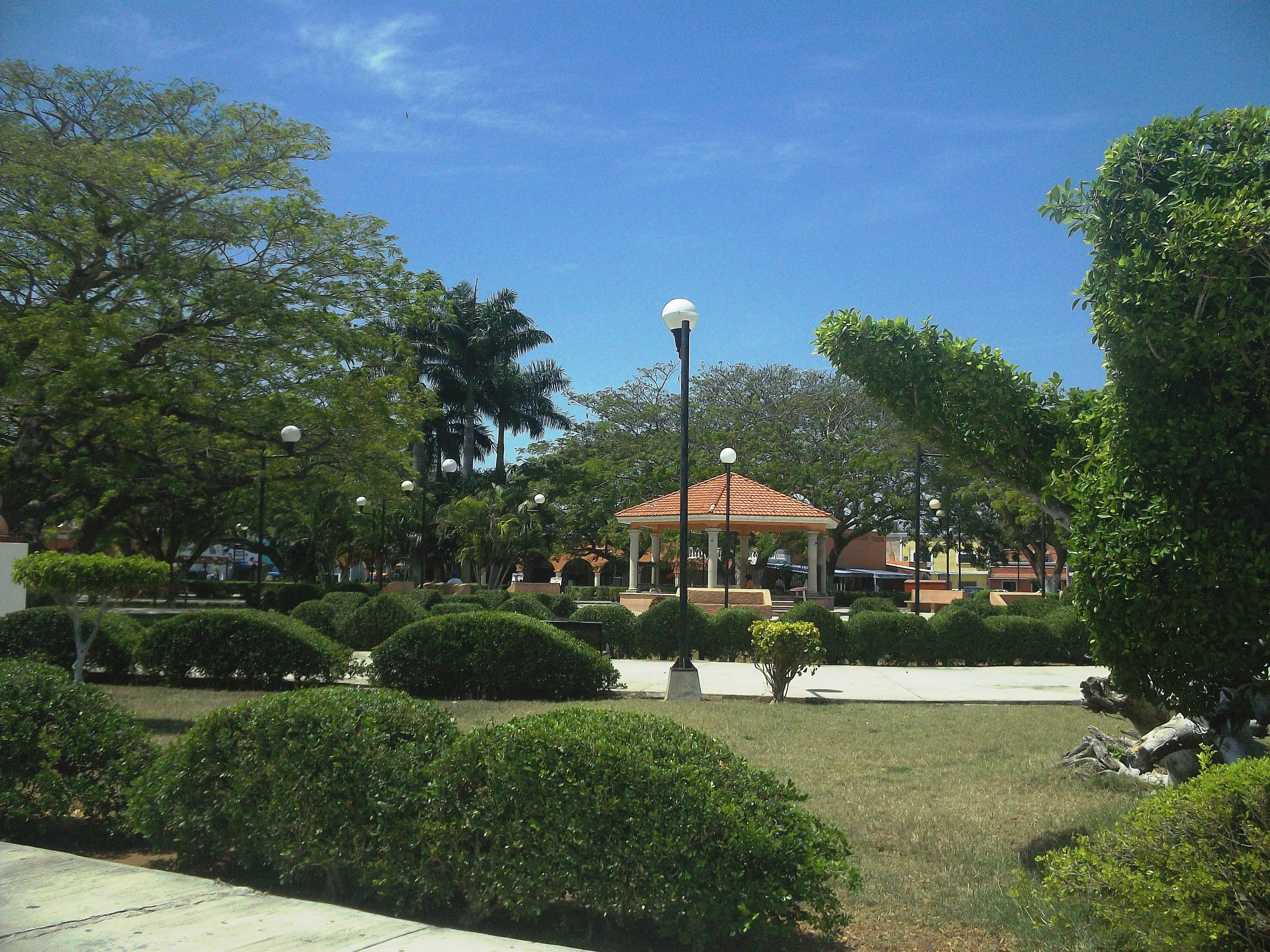
Principal Park of Dzidzantún

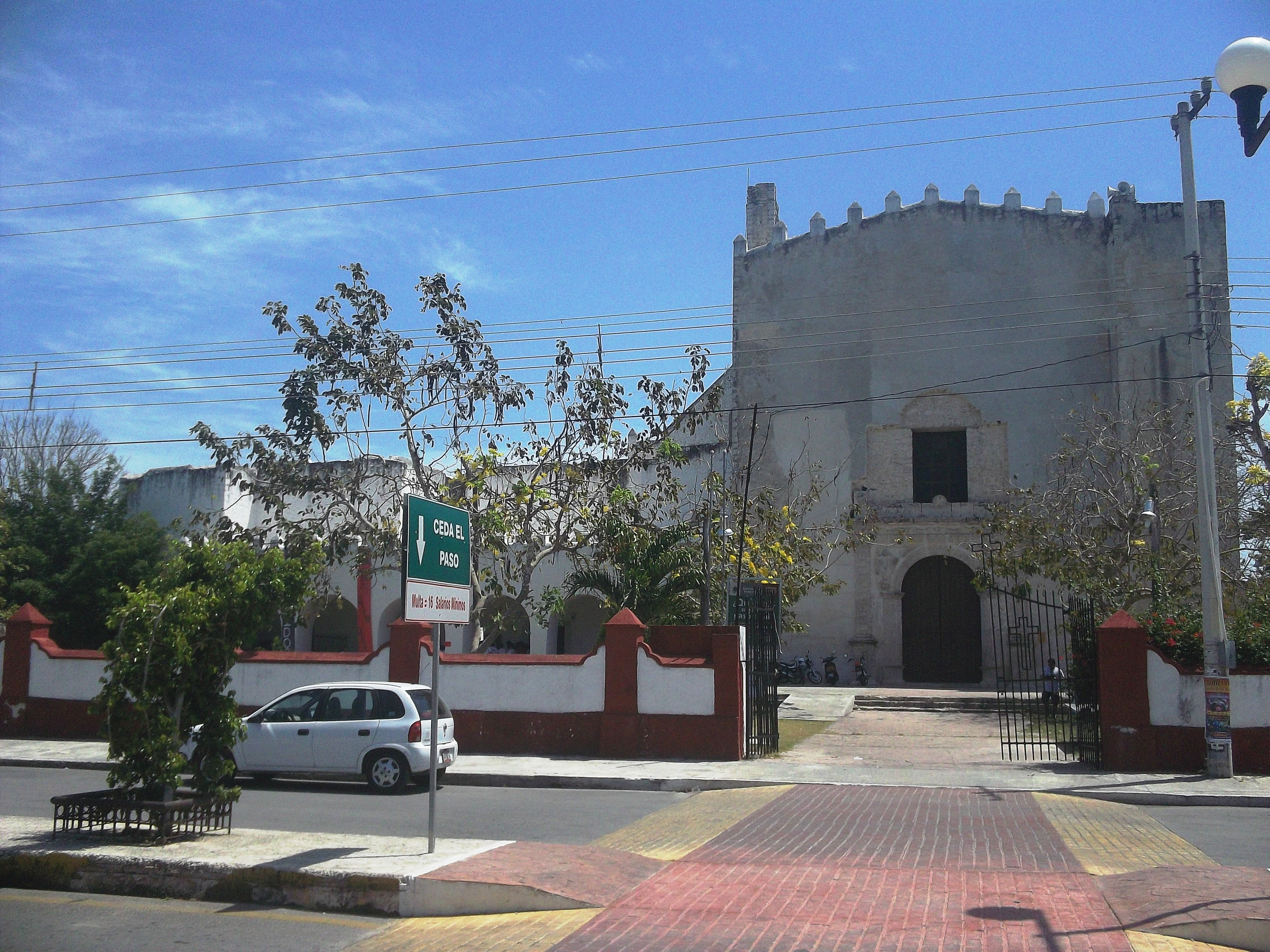
Principal Church of Dzidzantún

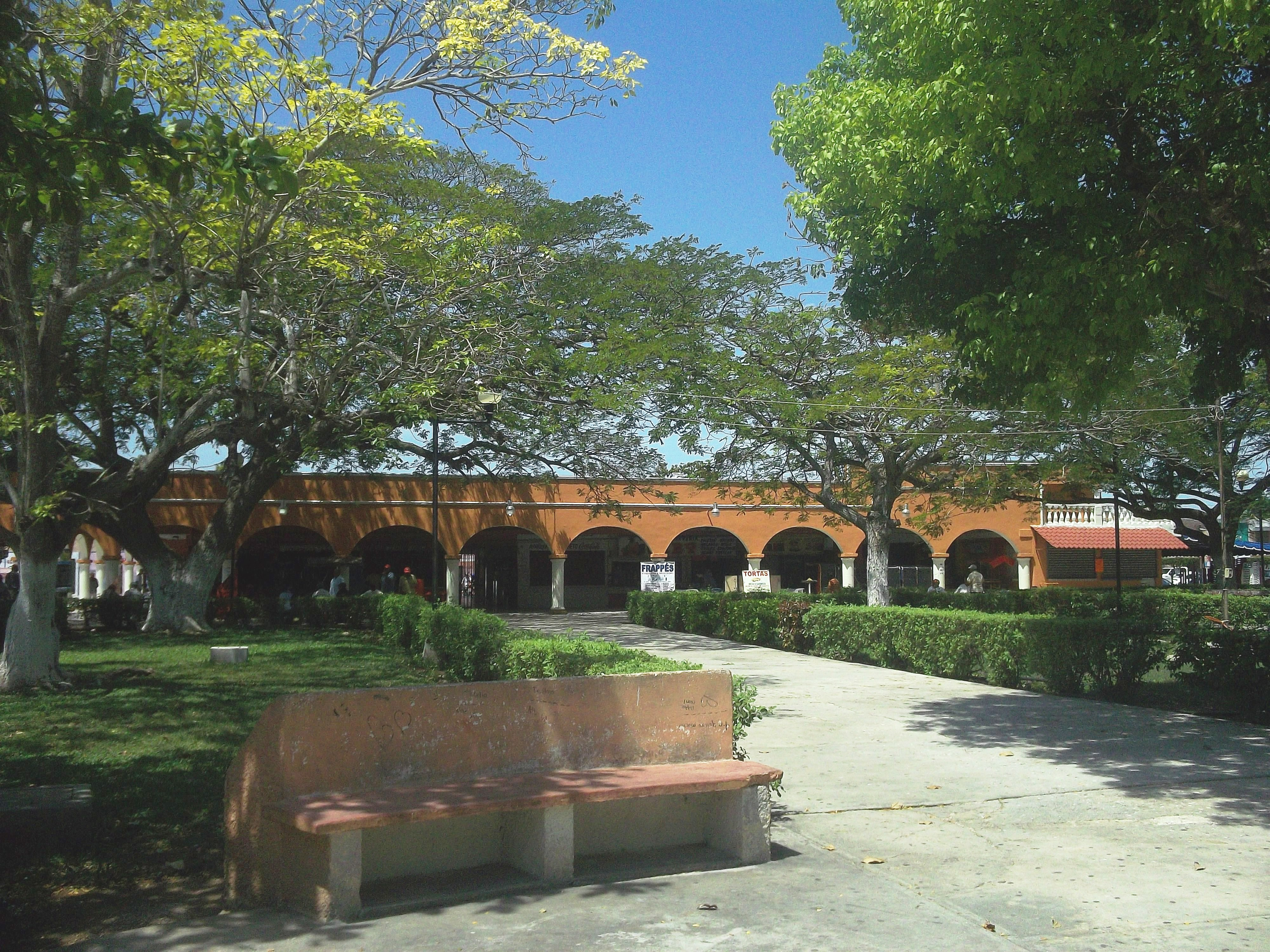
Dzidzantún Municipal Market

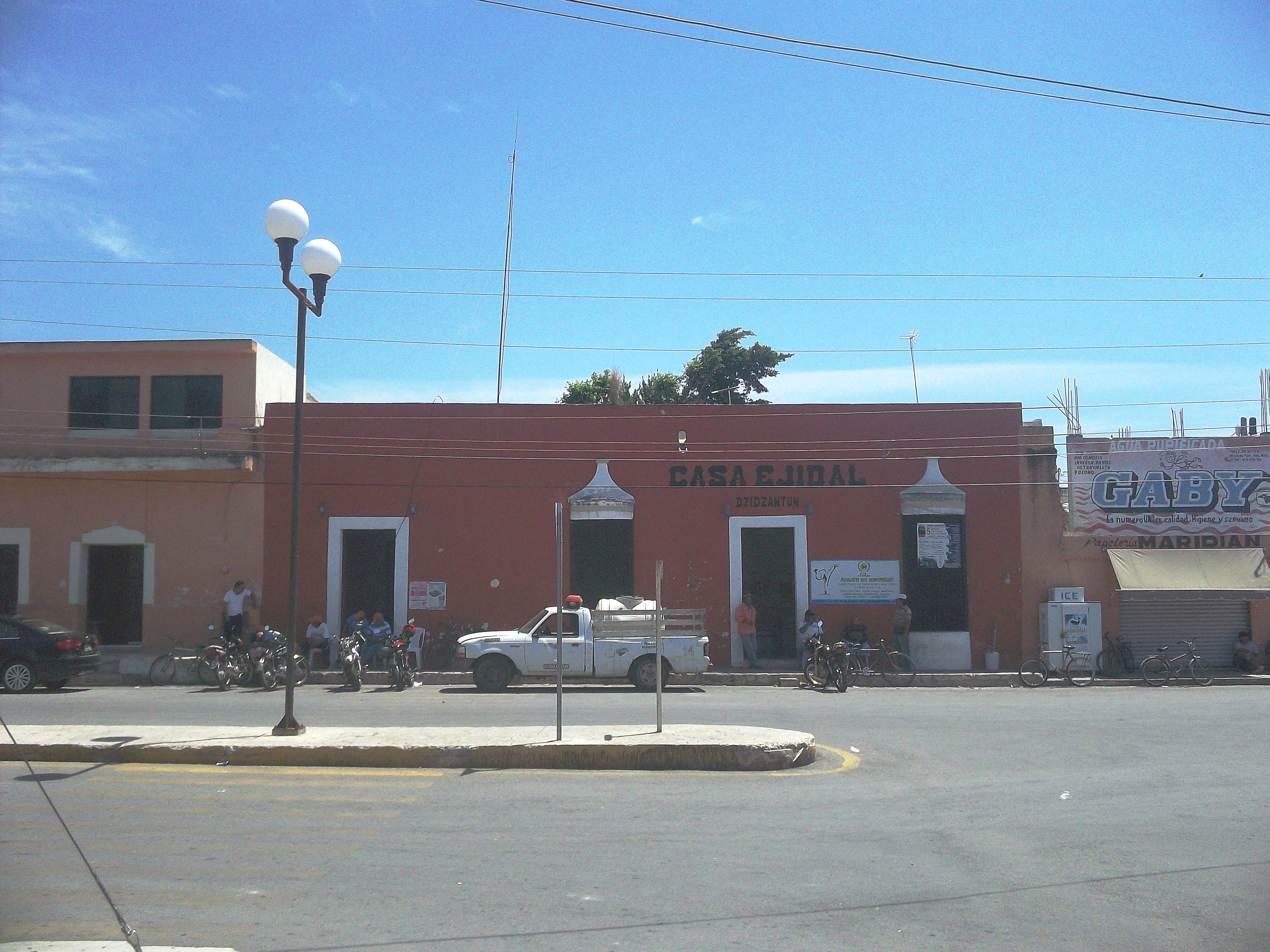
Dzidzantún Casa Ejidal
