= Dzidzantún Municipality =

Municipality in the Mexican state of Yucatán

Dzidzantún
- Municipality
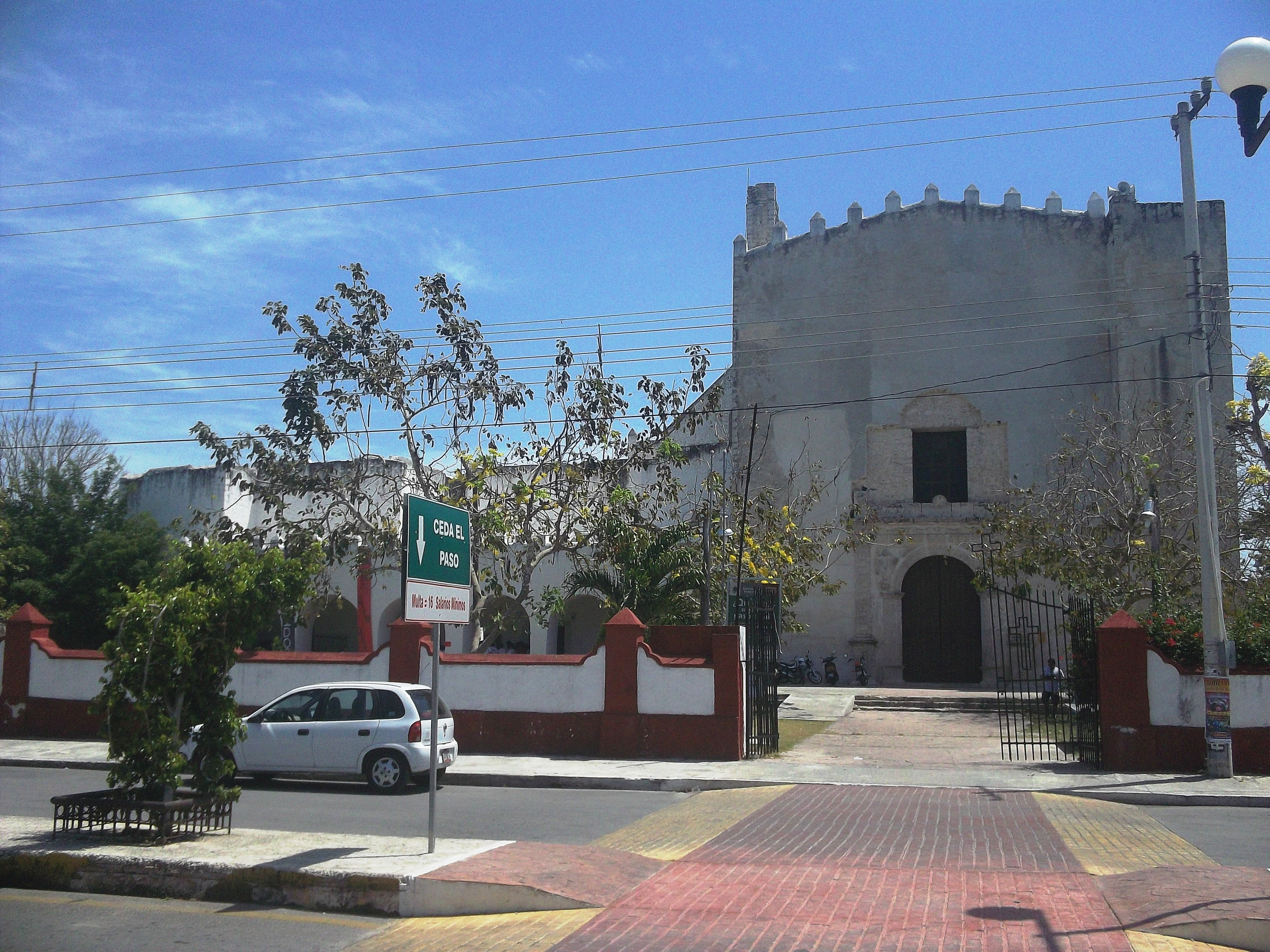
- Principal Church of Dzidzantún, Yucatán

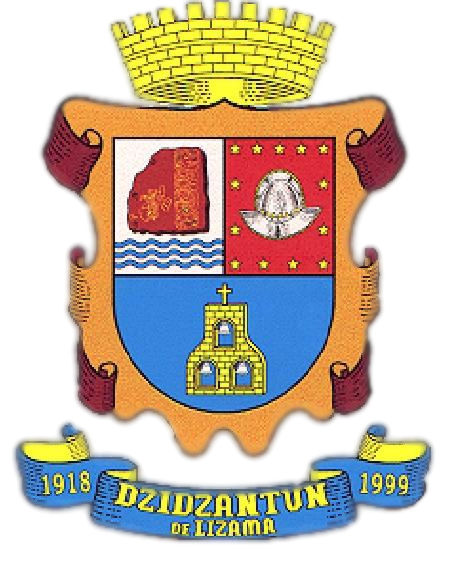
- Coat of arms

- Municipal location in Yucatán

- Location of the Municipality in Mexico
- Coordinates: 21°14′45″N 89°02′35″W
- Country: Mexico
- State: Yucatán

Government
  - Type: 2012–2015
  - Municipal President: Ismael Aguilar Puc

Area
  - Total: 198.00 km^{2} (76.45 sq mi)
- Elevation: 2 m (6.6 ft)

Population (2010)
  - Total: 8,133
- Time zone: UTC-6 (Central Standard Time)
- INEGI Code: 027
- Major Airport: Merida (Manuel Crescencio Rejón) International Airport
- IATA Code: MID
- ICAO Code: MMMD

Dzidzantún Municipality (In the Yucatec Maya Language: “what is written in stone”) is a municipality in the Mexican state of Yucatán containing 198.00 square kilometres (76.45 sq mi) of land and located roughly 75 kilometres (47 mi) northeast of the city of Mérida.

== History ==
Before the arrival of the Spanish, the area belonged to the chieftainship of Ah Kin Chel. After the conquest the area became part of the encomienda system. The encomienda was established in 1549 for Hernán Muñoz Vaquiano.

Yucatán declared its independence from the Spanish Crown in 1821 and in 1825, the area was assigned to the Temax Municipality. In 1918 it was designated as its own municipality.

During the 17th century there were many pirates who attacked the Spanish colonies, and many towns in the Yucatán peninsula were raided which included Dzidzantún. Franciscans, during the colonial days when the friars had a strong hold on the colony, built many monasteries in the Yucatán which included the monastery at Dzidzantún. Mural paintings in Yucatán were subject to vandalism and also due to climatic conditions of the tropics. Some of the monasteries in the early times had many religious murals. A few murals have been exposed in the Dzidzantun monastery also.

== Governance ==
The municipal president is elected for a three-year term. The town council has seven councilpersons, who serve as Secretary and councilors of ecology, public works, police stations, public monuments, nomenclature, and special events.

The Municipal Council administers the business of the municipality. It is responsible for budgeting and expenditures and producing all required reports for all branches of the municipal administration. Annually it determines educational standards for schools.

The Police Commissioners ensure public order and safety. They are tasked with enforcing regulations, distributing materials and administering rulings of general compliance issued by the council.

== Communities ==
The head of the municipality is Dzidzantún, Yucatán. The other populated areas of the municipality include El Porvenir, Faller, La Rosita, Mina de Oro, San Felipe Chuylem, Santa Clara, and Valdez Tercero. The significant populations are shown below:

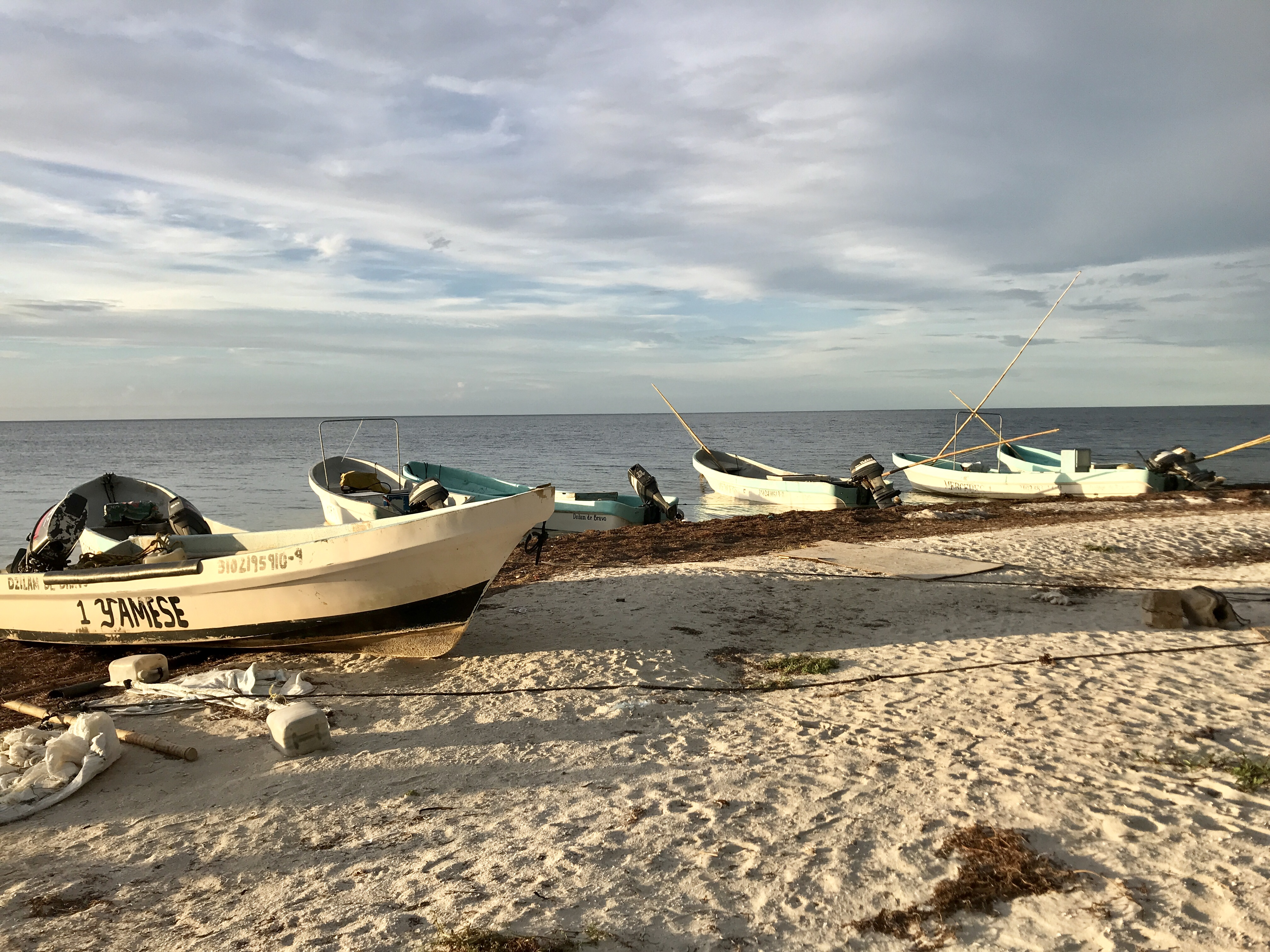
Boats docked in the fishing town of Santa Clara, Yucatán (Dzidzantun Municipality).

Community	Population
Entire Municipality (2010)	8,133
Dzidzantún	8119 in 2005
Santa Clara	31 in 2005

== Local festivals ==
Every year from the 10 to 13 June the town holds a celebration for San Antonio de Padua, patron of the town and hosts a festival in honor of Santa Clara from 8 to 14 August.

== Tourist attractions ==
- Church of San Antonio de Padua, built in the sixteenth century
- Church of La Purisima Concepcion, built in the seventeenth century
- Church of San Pedro, built in the seventeenth century
- Church and Convent of Santa Clara, which has the largest nave in Latin America
- Archaeological sites at Bolmay, Palaban, Petul, Poxil, Sotpol, Sotpol, Tamba, Xalau, Xcan, Xcoom, Xmaos and Xuyap.
- Hacienda San Francisco Tzacalha

Dzidzantún church dated to the 16th century has a facade which is bereft of towers and belfries. Also rich in mural art, some of the colonial artifacts such as painted reliefs from the altar pieces of Dzidzantun church are preserved in a museum.
