= Yobaín Municipality =

Municipality in the Mexican state of Yucatán

Yobaín
- Municipality
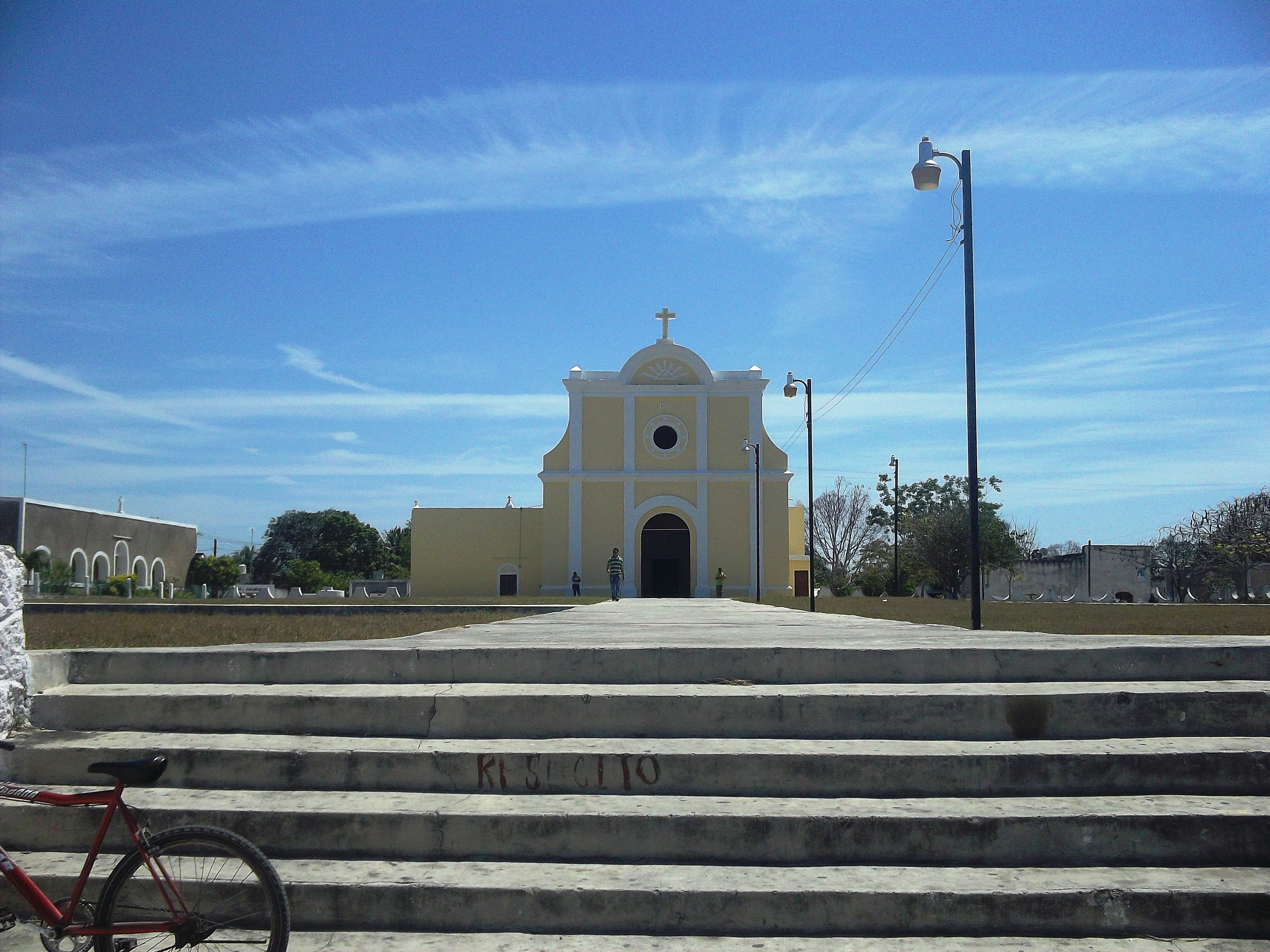
- Principal Church of Yobaín, Yucatán

- Region 4 Litoral centro #106

- Location of the Municipality in Mexico
- Coordinates: 21°13′57″N 89°07′00″W
- Country: Mexico
- State: Yucatán

Government
  - Type: 2012–2015
  - Municipal President: Adonay Avilés Sierra

Area
  - Total: 81.75 km^{2} (31.56 sq mi)
- Elevation: 4 m (13 ft)

Population (2010)
  - Total: 2,137
- Time zone: UTC-6 (Central Standard Time)
- INEGI Code: 009
- Major Airport: Merida (Manuel Crescencio Rejón) International Airport
- IATA Code: MID
- ICAO Code: MMMD

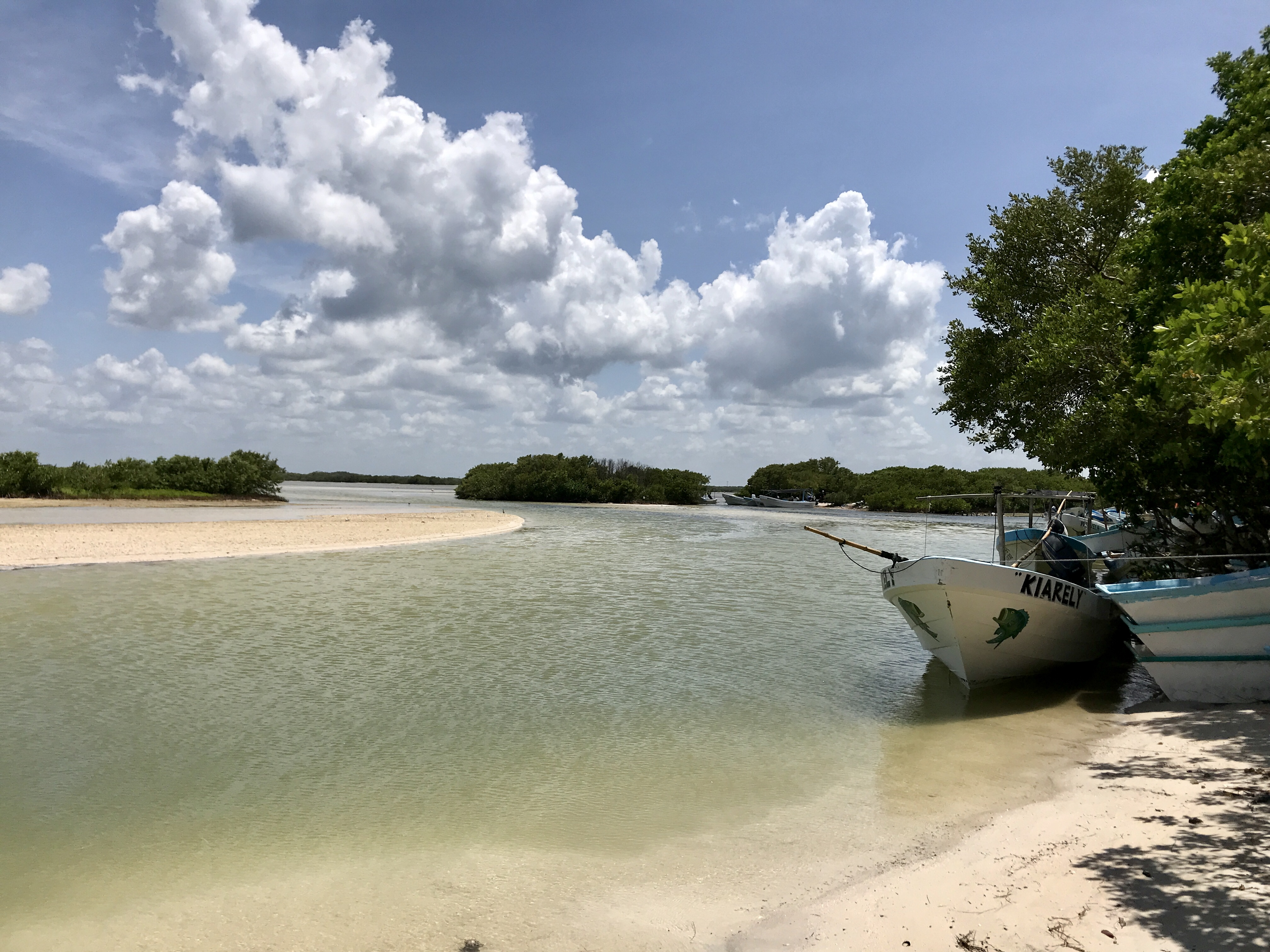

Yobaín Municipality (In the Yucatec Maya Language: “above crocodiles”) is a municipality in the Mexican state of Yucatán containing 81.75 km^{2} of land and located roughly 70 km northeast of the city of Mérida.

== History ==
Before the arrival of the Spanish, the area belonged to the chieftainship of Ah Kin Chel. After the conquest the area became part of the encomienda system. Between 1545 and 1555 the Spanish founded this town and established Don Galiano as one of the first encomenderos.

Yucatán declared its independence from the Spanish Crown in 1821 and in 1825, the area was assigned to the Temax Municipality. It was designated as its own municipality in 1918.

== Governance ==
The municipal president is elected for a three-year term. The town council has four councilpersons, who serve as Secretary and councilors of culture, public works, and nomenclature.

== Communities ==
The head of the municipality is Yobaín, Yucatán. The other populated areas of the municipality include Chabihau, Chántul, Chúmhabim, Kayac, Santa Ana, Santa Ursula, and Tzémul. The significant populations are shown below:

Community	Population
Entire Municipality (2010)	2,137
Chabihau	278 in 2005
Yobaín	1768 in 2005

== Local festivals ==
Every year on 10 August the town holds a celebration for its patron saint, San Lorenzo.

== Tourist attractions ==
- Church of San Lorenzo, built in the seventeenth century and restored around 1914
