= Hacienda Chenché de las Torres =

- Private Residence
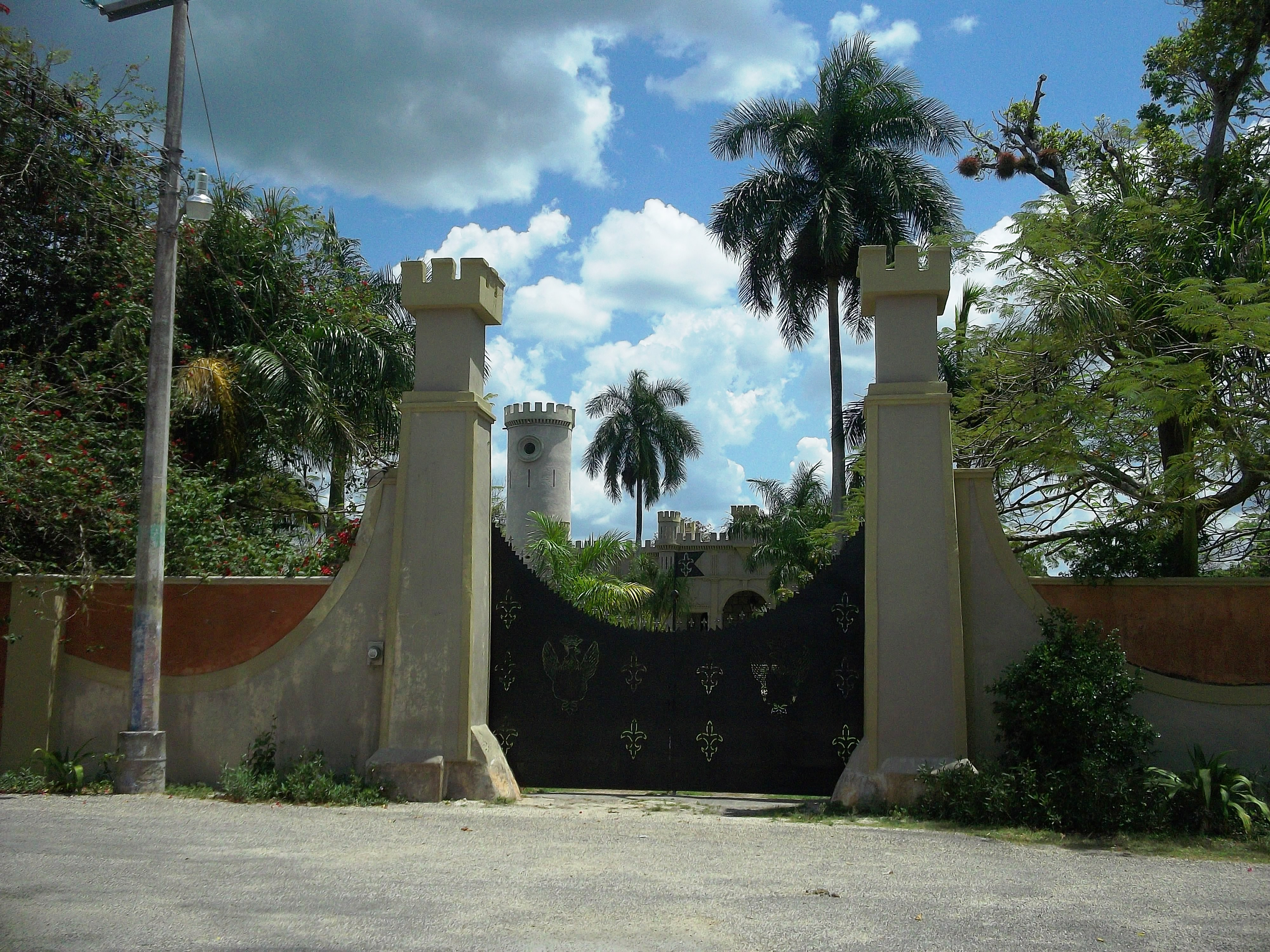
- Entrance Hacienda Chenché de las Torres, Yucatán.

- Location in Mexico
- Coordinates: 21°7′47″N 88°58′43″W
- Country: Mexico
- Mexican States: Yucatán
- Municipalities: Temax
- Time zone: UTC−6 (CST)
  - Summer (DST): UTC−5 (CDT)
- Postal code: 97515
- Area code: 991

Hacienda Chenché de las Torres is located in the Temax Municipality in the state of Yucatán in southeastern Mexico. It is one of the properties that arose during the nineteenth century henequen boom, and was owned by Álvaro Peón de Regil y Joaquina Peón Castellanos, the Count and Countess of Miraflores.

== Toponymy ==
The name (Chenché de las Torres) is a combination of Maya and Spanish terms. Chenché is a word from the Mayan language and Torres, is a Spanish surname meaning towers.

== How to get there ==
Heading northeast out of Mérida on 176 Carretera Cansahcab–Temax (Cansahcab–Temax Highway) towards Temax. At kilometer marker 15, turn right towards Chenché.

== History ==
The property originally belonged to the Count and Countess of Miraflores. In the 18th Century, a family named Manzanilla acquired the ownership from Countess Dona Candelaria Peón y Peón, the last Miraflores descendant. When the Manzanilla family abandoned the property in the 1950s, they left the archives of the hacienda in a storage room. Anthropologist logo Michel Antochiw Kolpa convinced them to donate the records to Apoyo al Desarrollo de Archivos y Bibliotecas de México (ADABI) (Development Support Archives and Libraries of Mexico) to preserve this important part of Yucatecan history.

The current owner is Isabelle Kimmelman, who has taken over its latest restoration.

== Architecture ==
The architecture of the original hacienda main house was modified to resemble a European medieval fortress, including two striking towers 15–20 meters high. Heraldic shields which were popular in Germany and England during the Renaissance adorned the walls. On the exterior walls on either side of the front door, are the family crests of Álvaro Peón de Regil y Joaquina Peón Castellanos, the Count and Countess of Miraflores, who modified the original building to look like a castle. The grounds contain a neo-Gothic chapel surrounding gardens with native plants and neo-Gothic chapel.

By the 1950s, the house was abandoned and had fallen into disrepair. In 2001 a restoration was begun to replace missing ceilings, repair or recreate broken tile floors and walls, as well as refurbish the grounds and chapel. Where possible, original features were maintained, such as the original stone steps of the entryway. "Pasta" or "mosaico" tiles are still made in the area and were used when floors could not be restored. The machine house had not yet been restored in 2010, but the chapel, which had originally served the community as well as the hacienda owners has been fully restored. The property is not open to the general public. Kimmelman repurposed elements found on the property, for example, rescued beams were made into the massive top for the dining room table and a balustrade found in a storehouse was cut into the table's legs. Elaborate wall stencils throughout the house were recreated by using mylar templates to copy the designs for local craftsmen to duplicate.

== Demographics ==
All of the henequen plantations ceased to exist as autonomous communities with the agrarian land reform implemented by President Lazaro Cardenas in 1937. His decree turned the haciendas into collective ejidos, leaving only 150 hectares to the former landowners for use as private property. Figures before 1937 indicate populations living on the farm. After 1937, figures indicate those living in the community, as the remaining Hacienda Chenché de las Torres houses only the owner's immediate family.

According to the 2005 census conducted by the INEGI, the population of the city was 317 inhabitants, of whom 177 were men and 140 were women.

Population of Chenche de Las Torres by year
Year	1900	1910	1921	1930	1940	1950	1960	1970	1980	1990	1995	2000	2005
Population	293	336	286	297	288	301	338	451	521	335	328	328	317

== Photo gallery ==
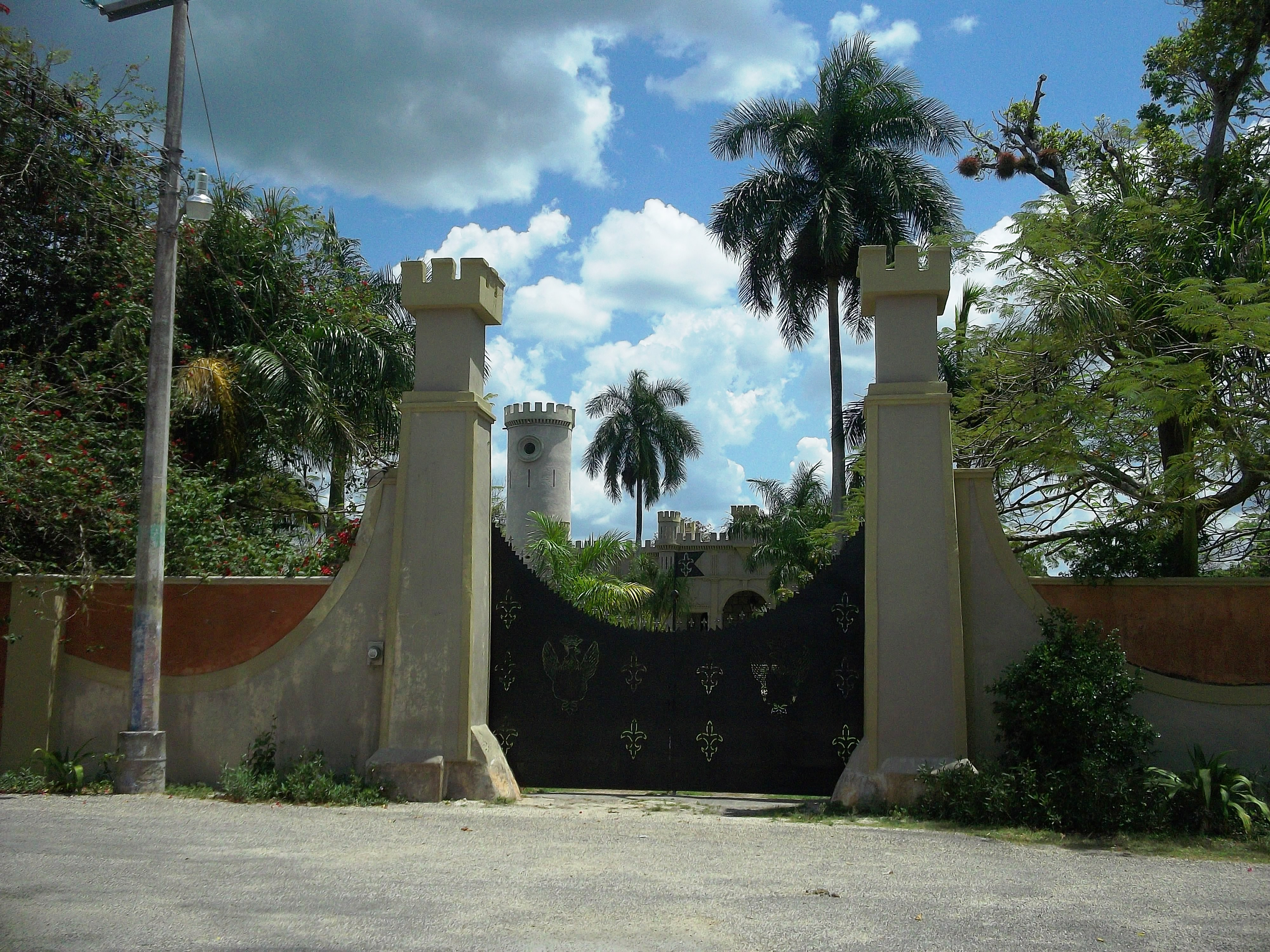
Entrance to Hacienda Chenché de las Torres.

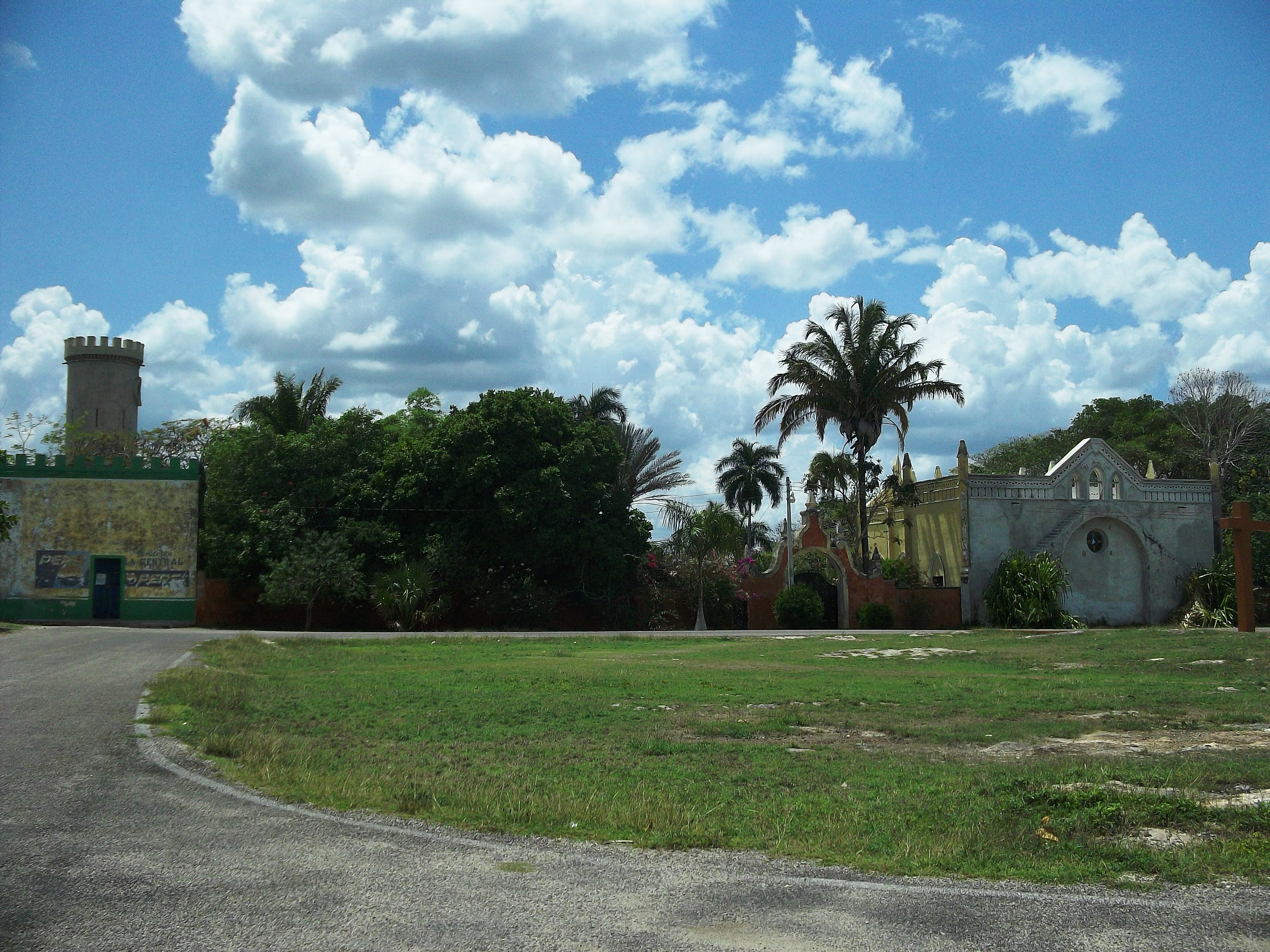
View of the Hacienda Chenché de las Torres.

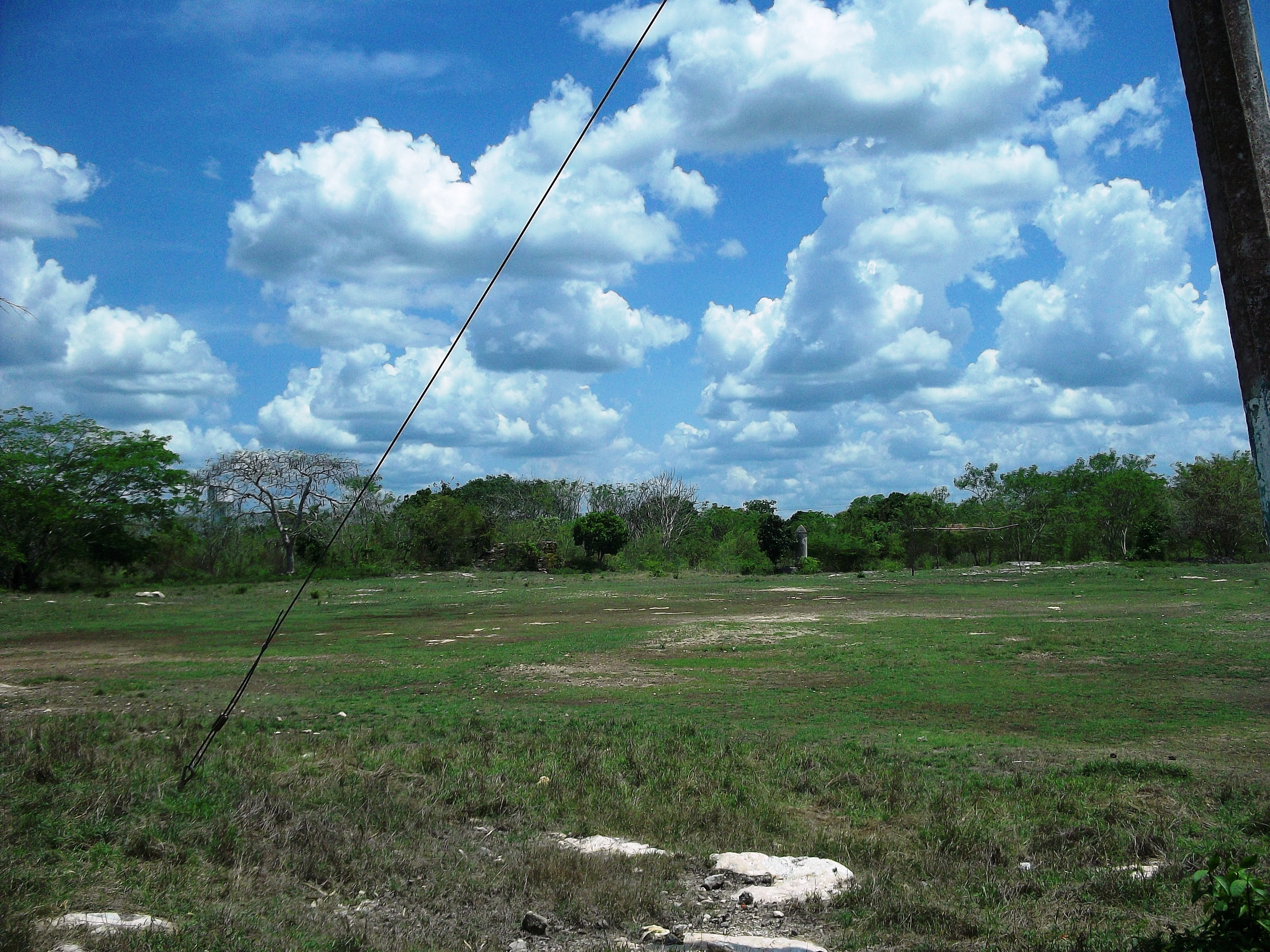
View of the Hacienda Chenché de las Torres.

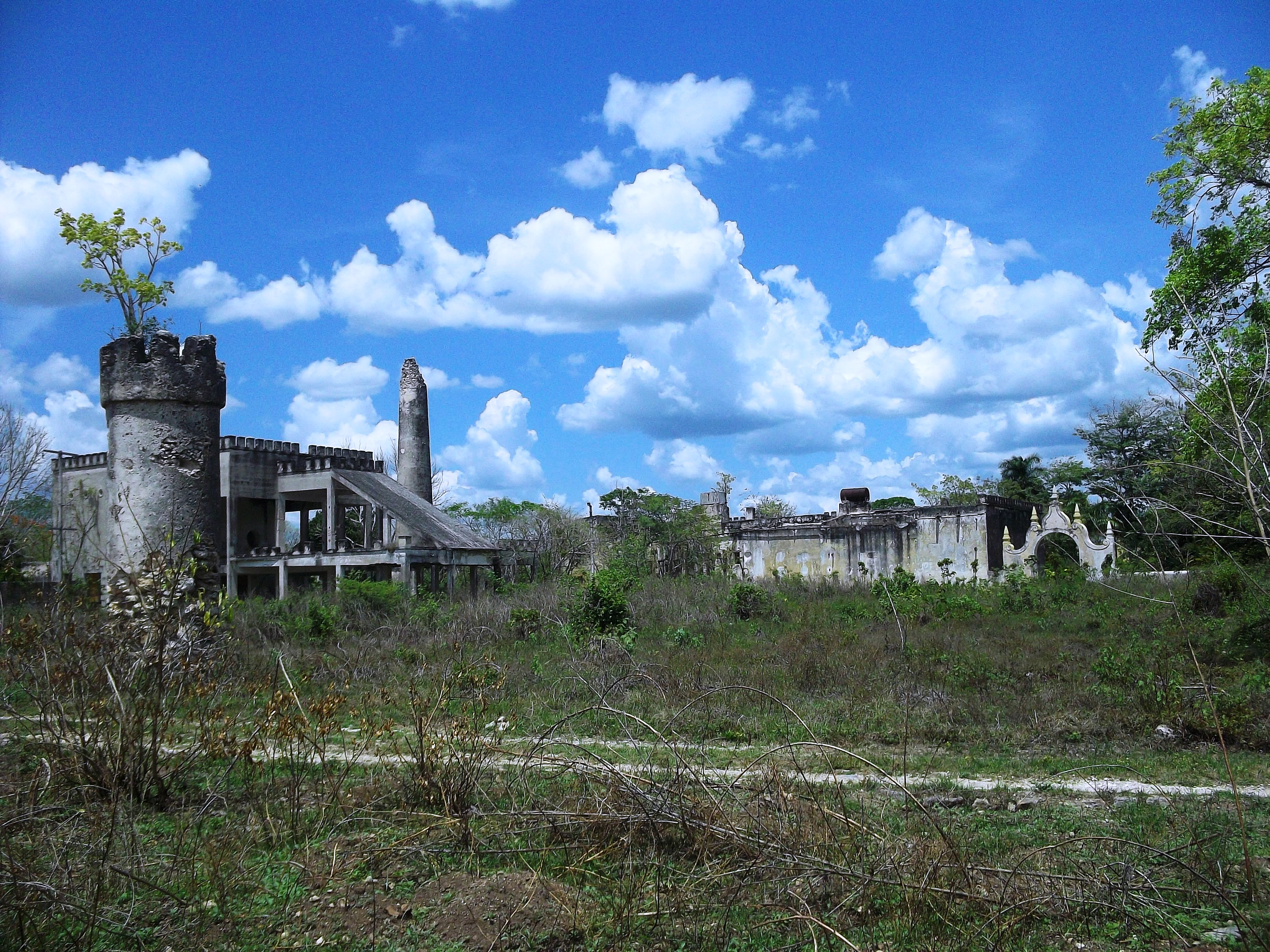
View of the Hacienda Chenché de las Torres.

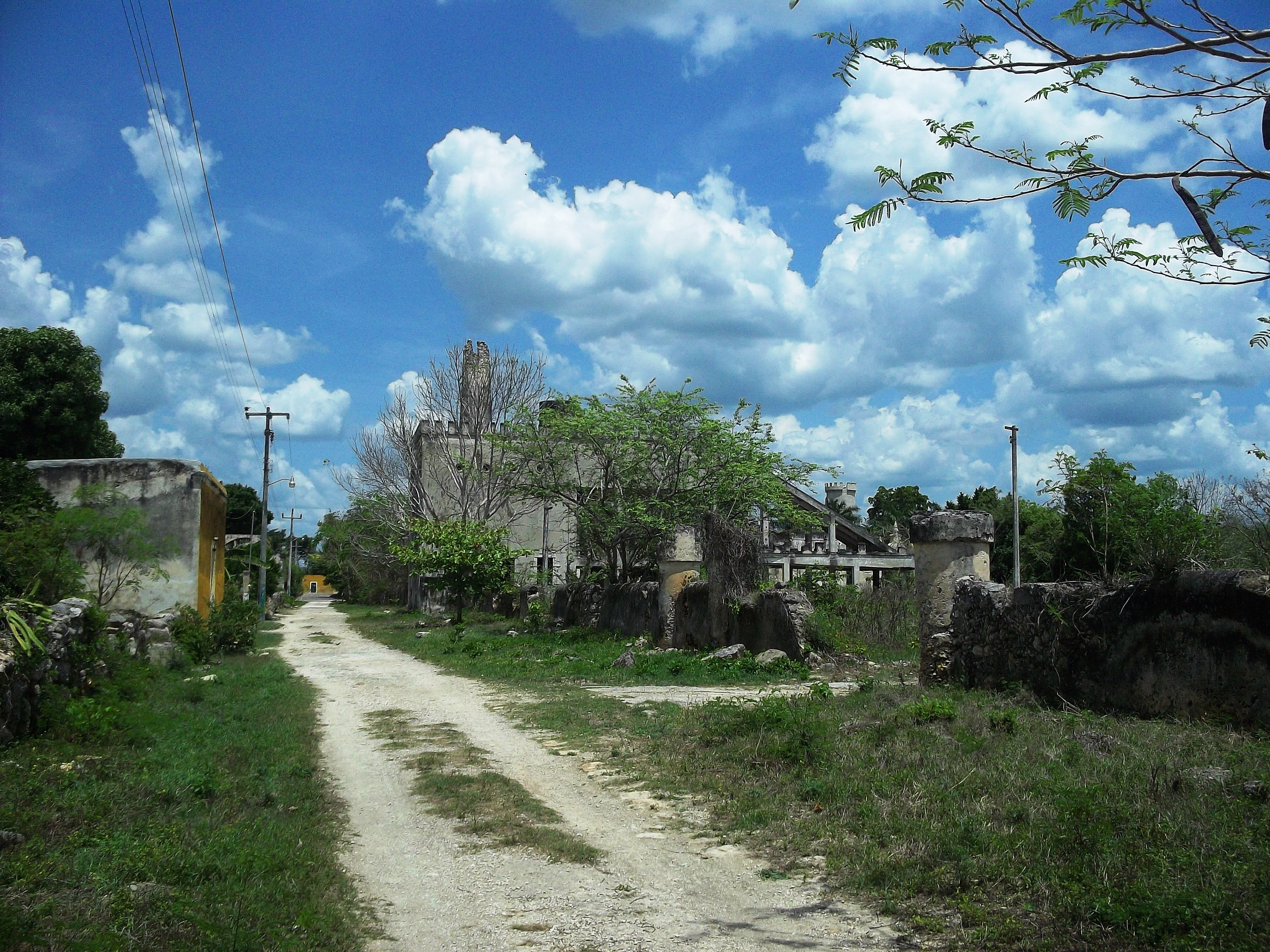
View of the Hacienda Chenché de las Torres.

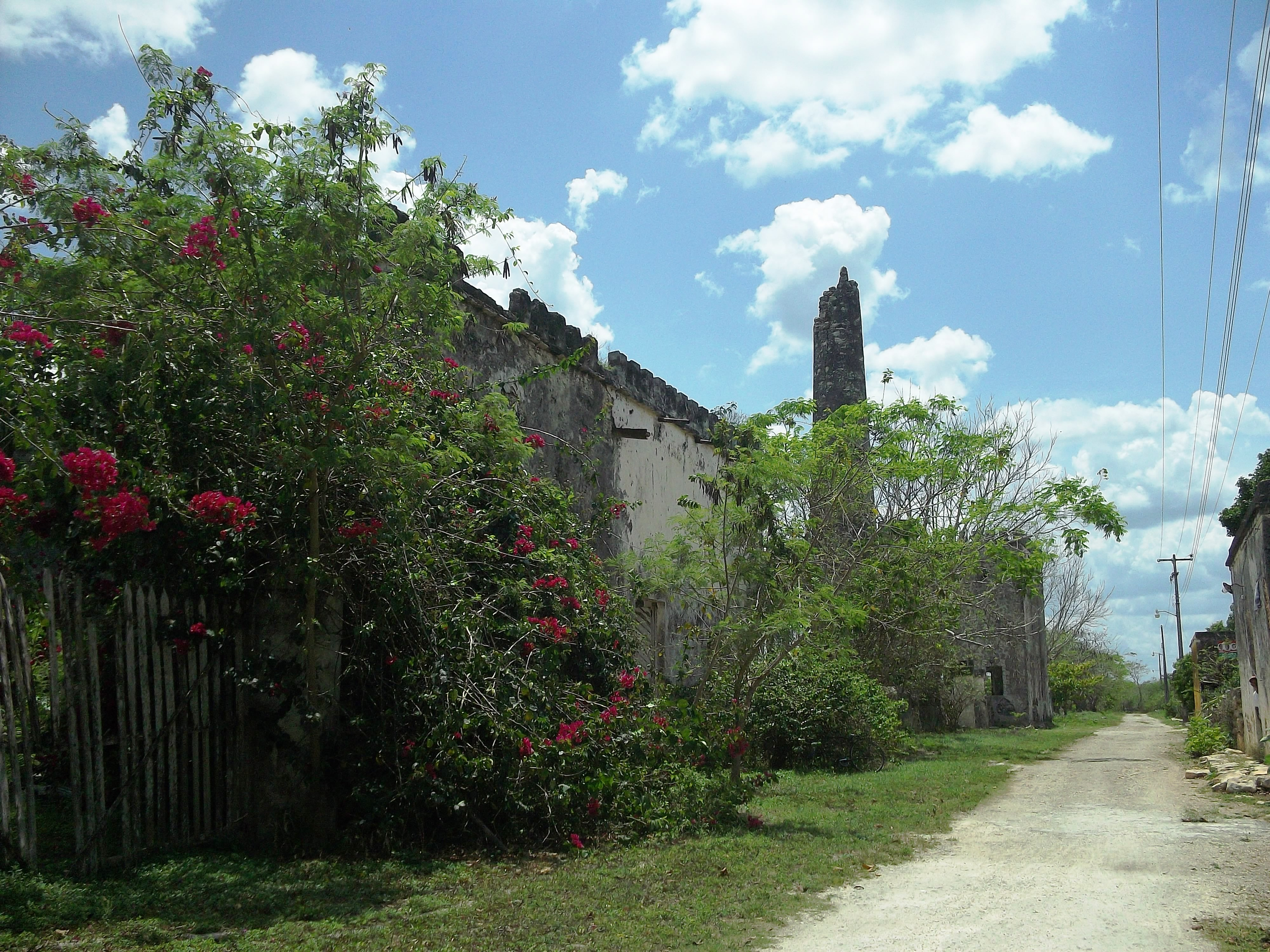
View of the Hacienda Chenché de las Torres.

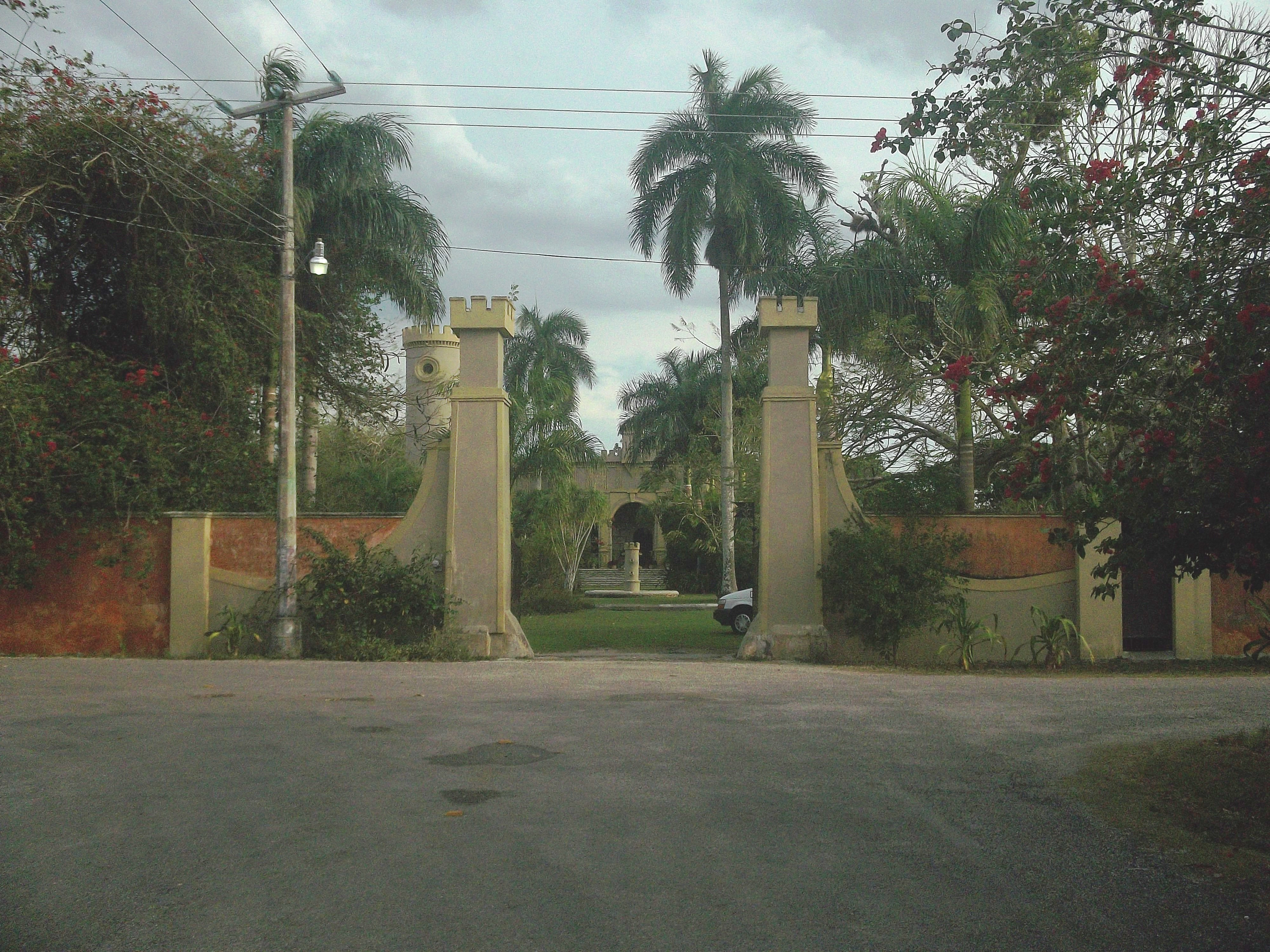
Entrance to Hacienda Chenché de las Torres.

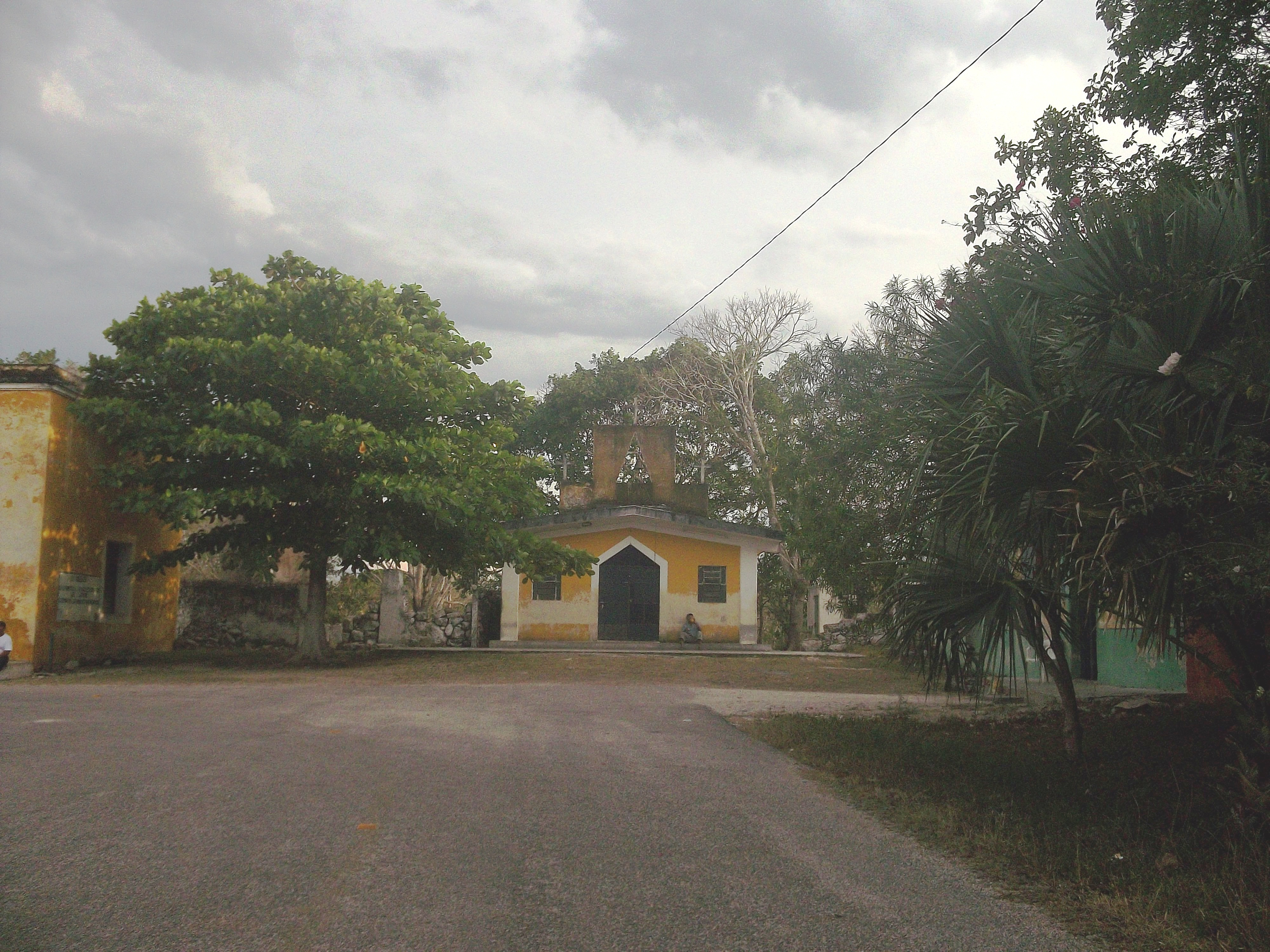
Chapel of the Hacienda Chenché de las Torres.

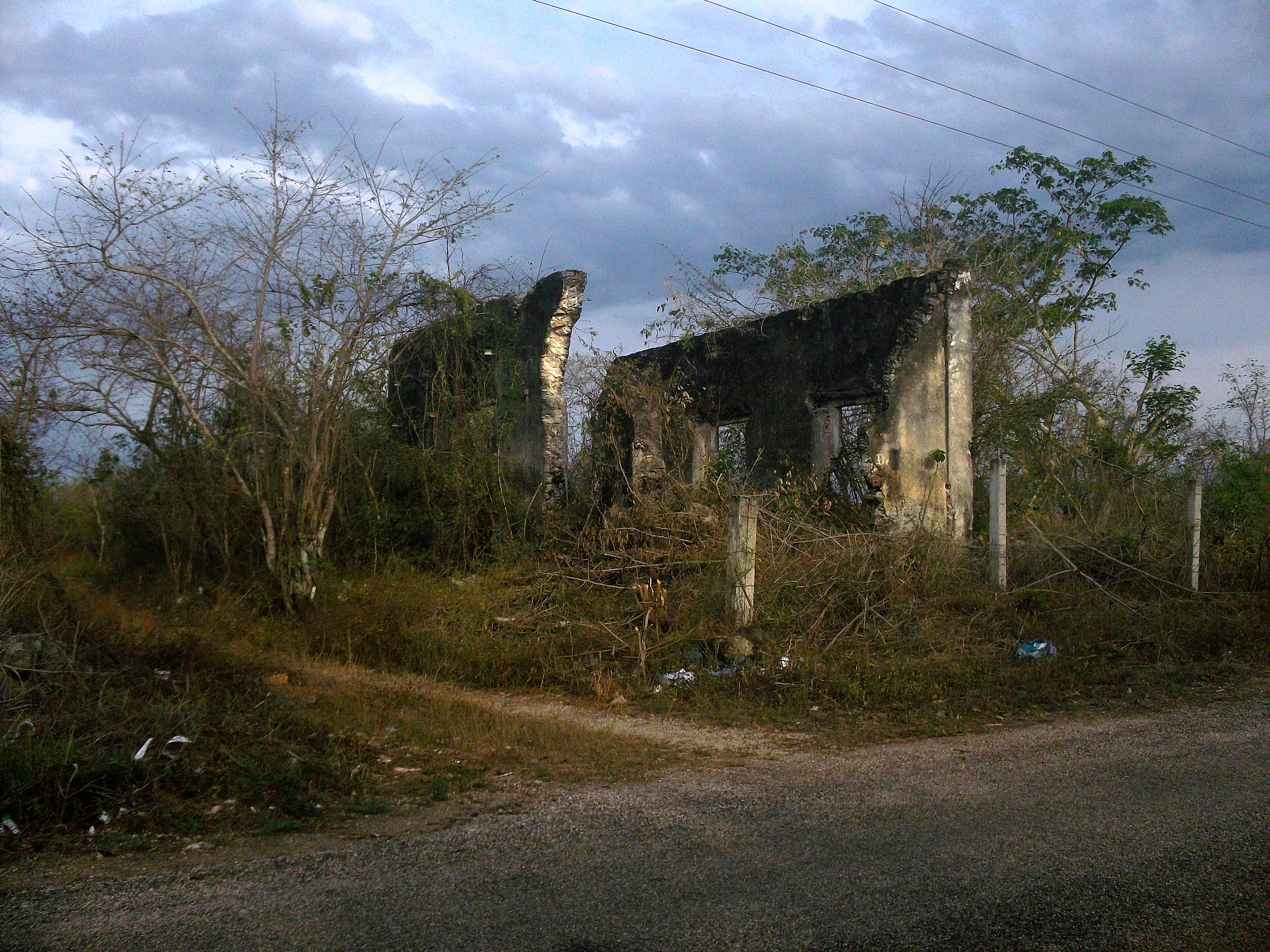
Train Station.

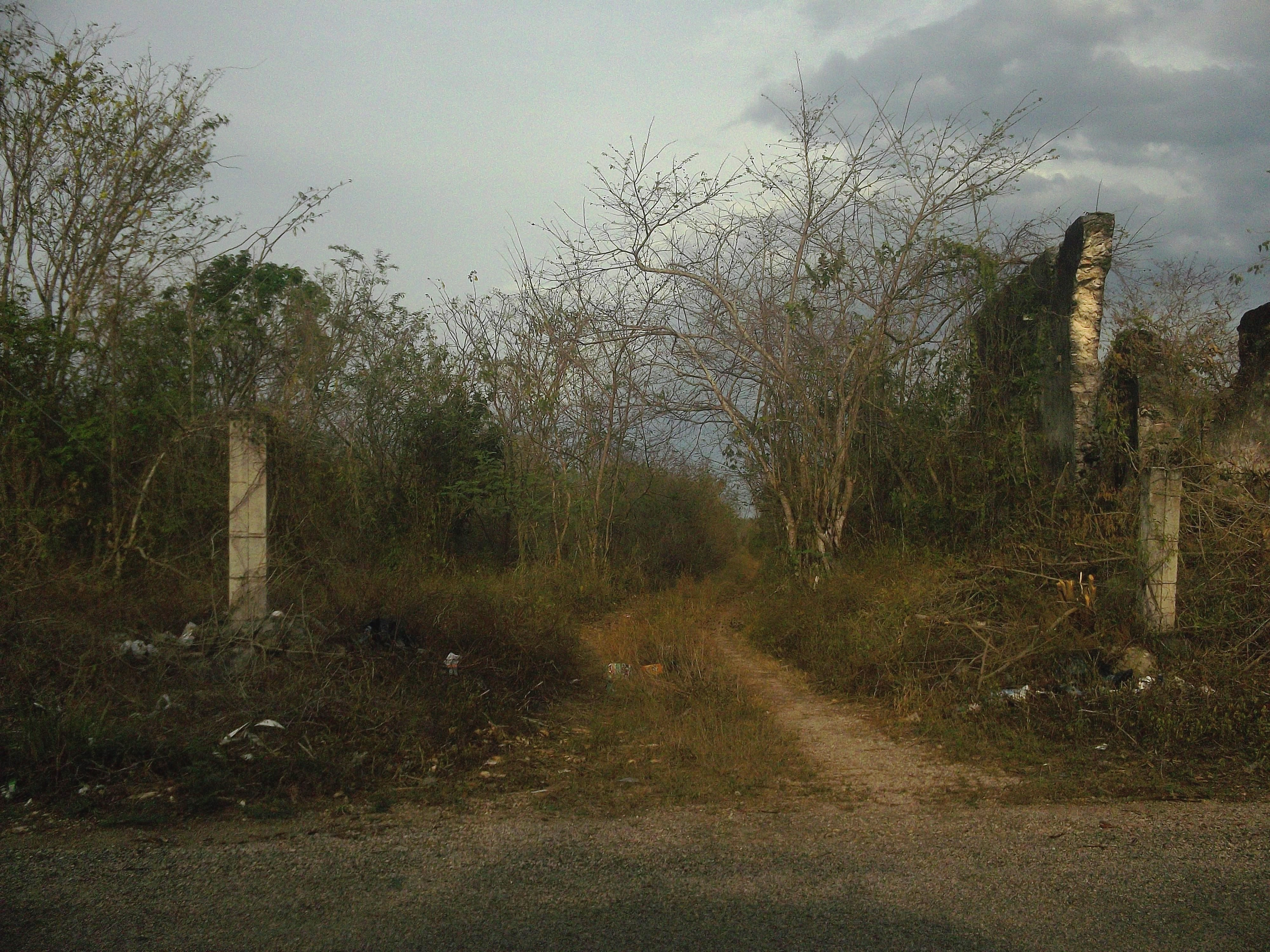
Railway line to Temax.

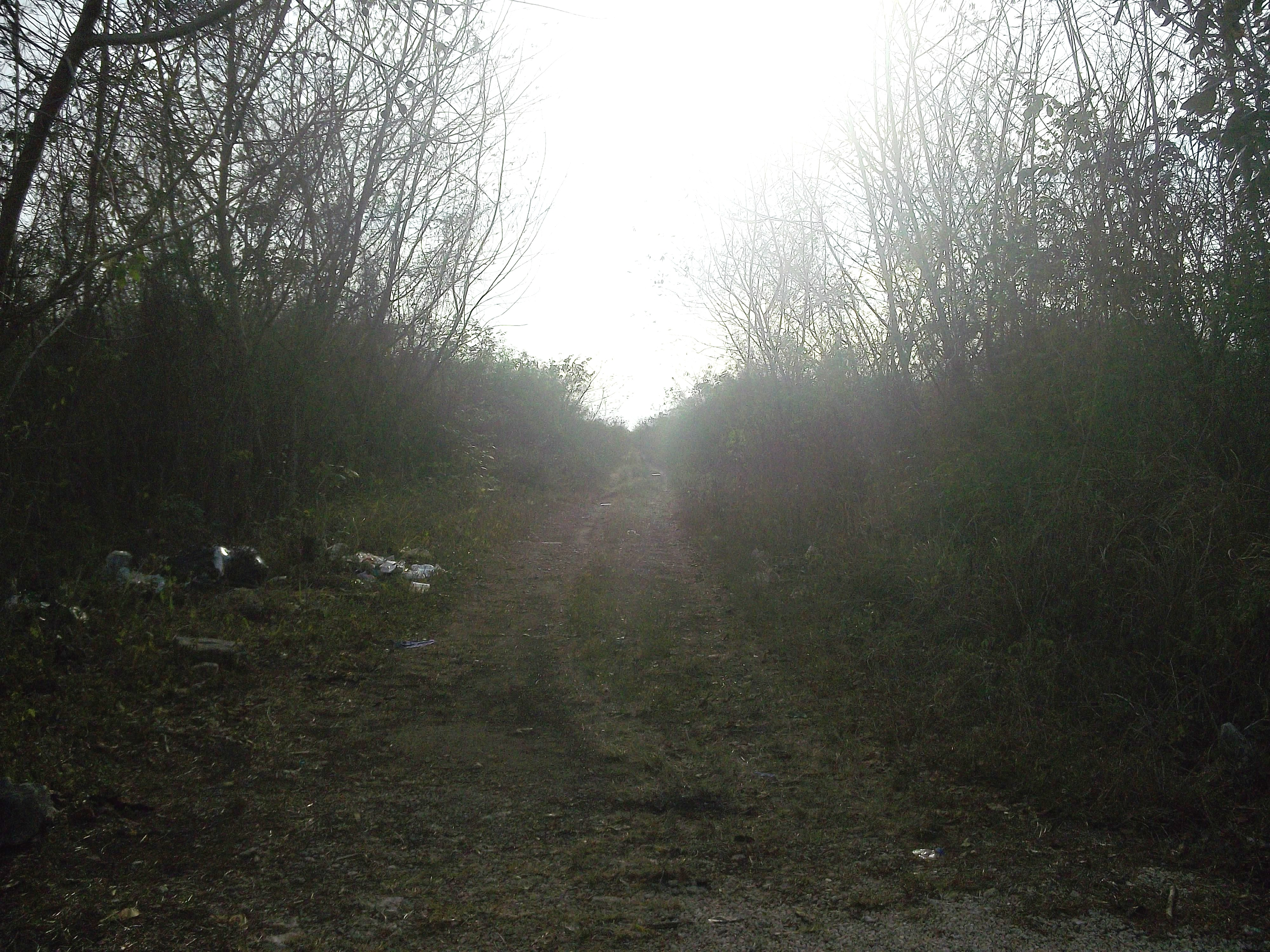
Railway line to Santa María.

== Bibliography ==
- Bracamonte, P and Solís, R., Los espacios de autonomía maya, Ed. UADY, Mérida, 1997.
- Gobierno del Estado de Yucatán, "Los municipios de Yucatán", 1988.
- Kurjack, Edward y Silvia Garza, Atlas arqueológico del Estado de Yucatán, Ed. INAH, 1980.
- Patch, Robert, La formación de las estancias y haciendas en Yucatán durante la colonia, Ed. UADY, 1976.
- Peón Ancona, J. F., "Las antiguas haciendas de Yucatán", en Diario de Yucatán, Mérida, 1971.
