= Temax =

Town in the Mexican state of Yucatán

- Municipal Seat
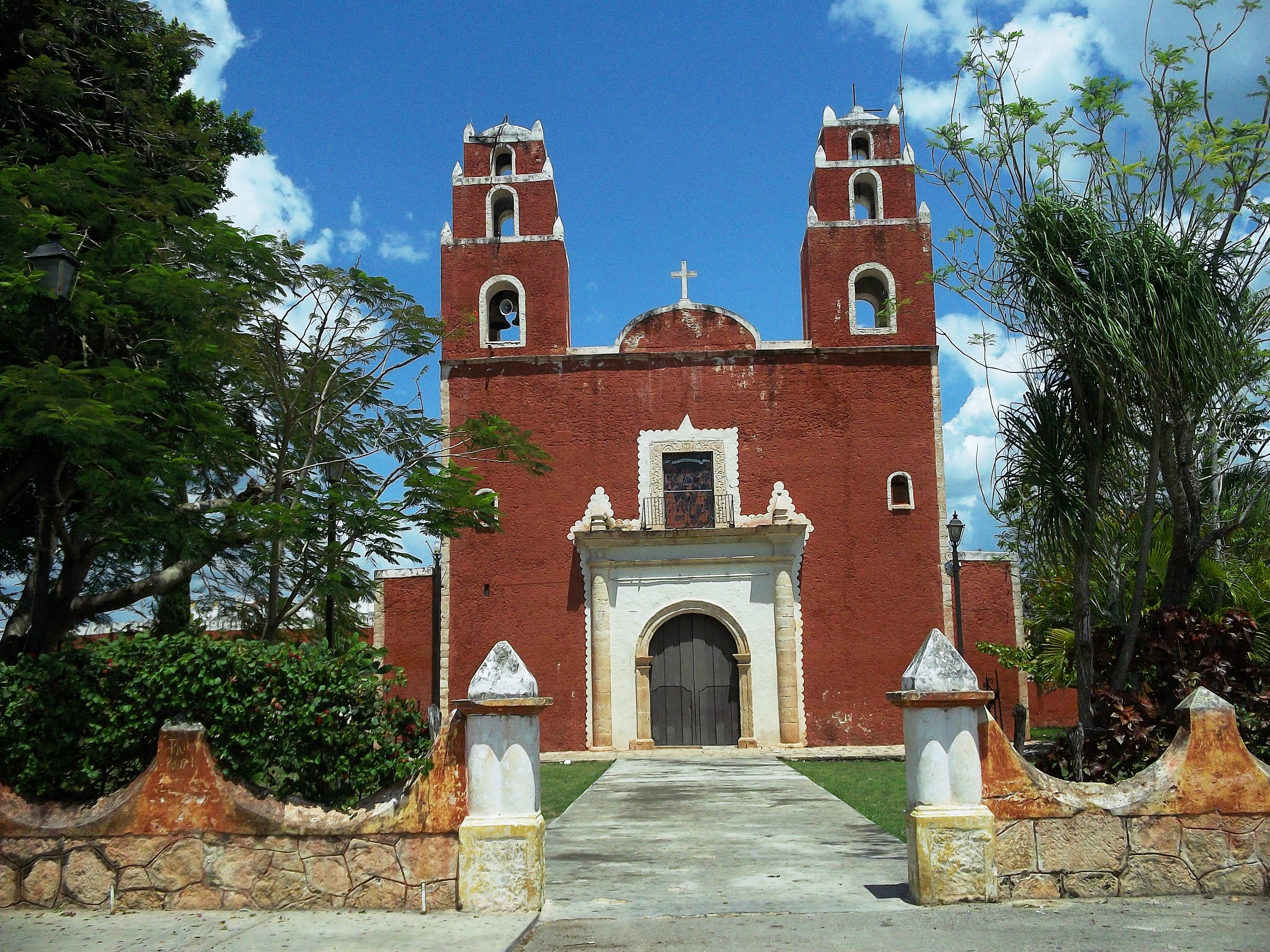
- Main church of Temax.

- Location within Yucatán (state)
- Coordinates: 21°09′04″N 88°56′25″W
- Country: Mexico
- State: Yucatán
- Municipality: Temax

Government
  - Mayor: Angel Antonio Gonzalez Escalante
- Elevation: 7 m (23 ft)

Population (2010)
  - Total: 6,239
- Time zone: UTC-6 (Central Standard Time)
- Postal code (of seat): 92479
- Area code: 991
- INEGI code: 310840001
- Demonym: Temaxeño

Temax is a town and the municipal seat of the Temax Municipality, Yucatán in Mexico. As of 2010, the town has a population of 6,239.

== Demographics ==
Historical population

Year	Pop.	±%
1900	1,800	—
1910	1,881	+4.5%
1921	2,690	+43.0%
1930	2,902	+7.9%
1940	3,312	+14.1%
1950	3,804	+14.9%
1960	4,752	+24.9%

Year	Pop.	±%
1970	4,915	+3.4%
1980	4,606	−6.3%
1990	6,000	+30.3%
1995	6,033	+0.6%
2000	5,765	−4.4%
2005	6,130	+6.3%
