= Yobaín =

Town in the Mexican state of Yucatán

- Municipal seat
- Location within Yucatán (state)
- Coordinates: 21°13′57″N 89°7′0″W
- Country: Mexico
- State: Yucatán
- Municipality: Yobaín
- Elevation: 4 m (13 ft)

Population (2010)
  - Total: 1,820

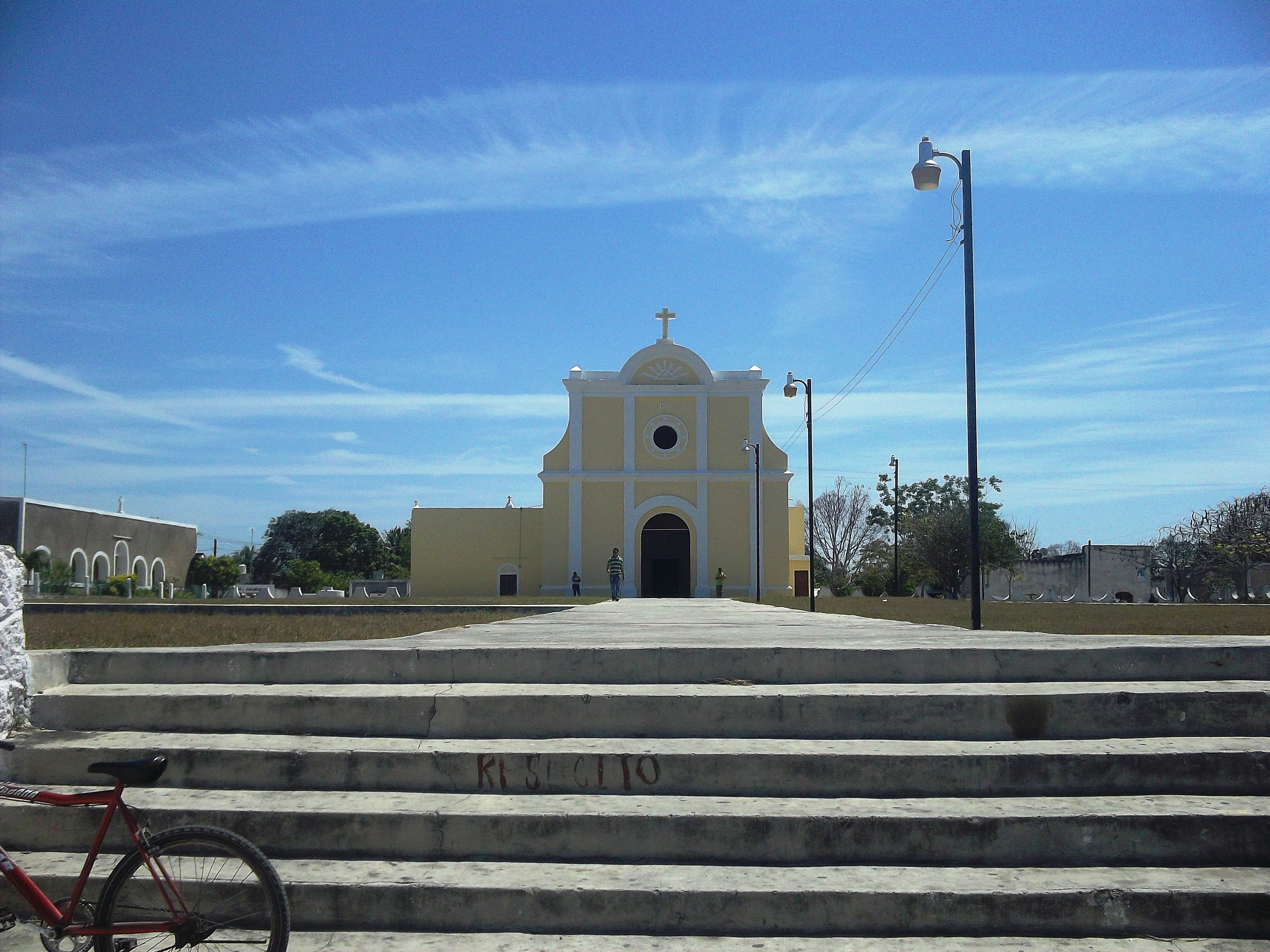
Main church of Yobaín, Yucatán.

Yobaín is a town and the municipal seat of the Yobaín Municipality, Yucatán in Mexico.
