= Temax Municipality =

Municipality in the Mexican state of Yucatán

Temax
- Municipality
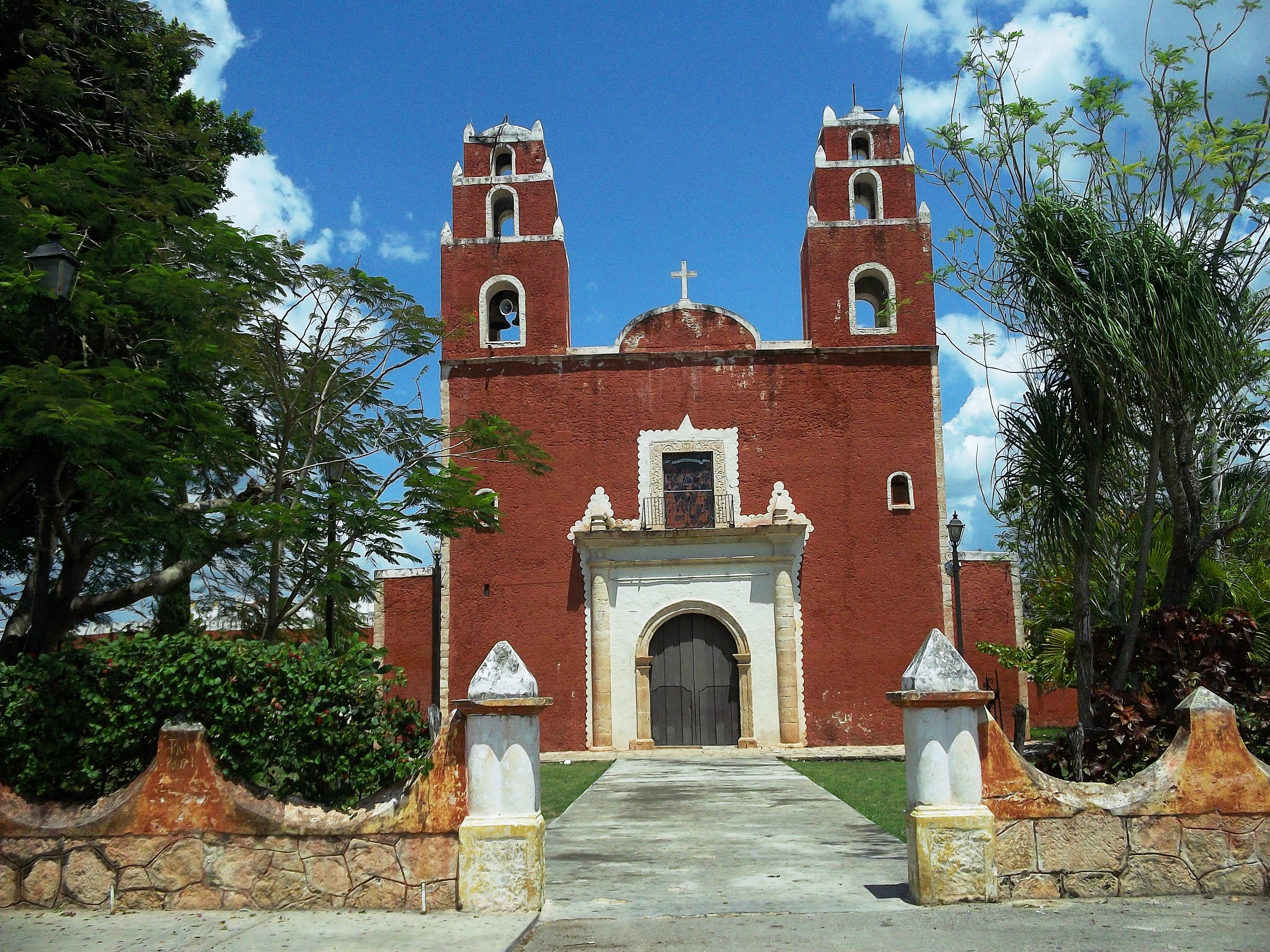
- Principal Church of Temax, Yucatán

- Municipal location in Yucatán

- Location of the Municipality in Mexico
- Coordinates: 21°02′55″N 89°02′20″W
- Country: Mexico
- State: Yucatán

Government
  - Type: 2012–2015
  - Municipal President: Miguel Alonso Pacheco Díaz

Area
  - Total: 329.52 km^{2} (127.23 sq mi)
- Elevation: 7 m (23 ft)

Population (2010)
  - Total: 6,817
- Time zone: UTC-6 (Central Standard Time)
- INEGI Code: 084
- Major Airport: Merida (Manuel Crescencio Rejón) International Airport
- IATA Code: MID
- ICAO Code: MMMD

Temax Municipality (In the Yucatec Maya Language: “place of monkeys”) is a municipality in the Mexican state of Yucatán containing 329.52 square kilometres (127.23 sq mi) of land and located roughly 80 kilometres (50 mi) northeast of the city of Mérida.

== History ==
It is unknown which chieftainship the area was under prior to the arrival of the Spanish. After the conquest the area became part of the encomienda system. The encomienda was established for the minor children of Juan de Sosa in 1549. In 1579 it passed to Juan de Sosa Velázquez and in 1607 three-quarters passed to Bernardo de Sosa Velázquez and one-quarter passed to Pedro de Sosa. In 1639 Juan de Villa Real was the encomendero and by 1688 Ana Dorantes possessed the trust.

Yucatán declared its independence from the Spanish Crown in 1821 and in 1825, the area was assigned to the coastal region with its headquarters in Izamal Municipality. It was designated as its own municipality by 1922.

Temax, though now a sleepy town, in the recent past its history had witnessed a disturbed and fascinating period on account of momentous caste wars during the middle of the nineteenth century. Situated as it is between the henequen area and the poorly inhabited inland region and the "settled plantations society" there were rebellions to stop land encroachments by the plantation community. In this context, Temax played a central role in creating an environment of insurgency led by Pedro Crespo, their powerful and aggressive political leader. The state authorities of Yucatán played a diplomatic role in recognizing the influence of Crespo and brokered peace with him by delegating autonomous power to Temax.

== Governance ==
The municipal president is elected for a three-year term. The town council has seven councilpersons, who serve as Secretary and councilors of public services, public safety, ecology, nomenclature, markets and roads.

The Municipal Council administers the business of the municipality. It is responsible for budgeting and expenditures and producing all required reports for all branches of the municipal administration. Annually it determines educational standards for schools.

The Police Commissioners ensure public order and safety. They are tasked with enforcing regulations, distributing materials and administering rulings of general compliance issued by the council.

== Communities ==
The head of the municipality is Temax, Yucatán. There are nearly 7,000 people who live in the municipality and nearly 6,000 of them live in Temax. The other populated areas of the municipality include Chenché de las Torres, Chucmichén, Chunicapó, Hacienda Limbo, Maní, San Antonio Cámara, San Felipe, San Luis, San Ramón, Torres Peón, Xipich, and Yaxché. The significant populations are shown below:

Community	Population
Entire Municipality (2010)	6,817
Chenché de las Torres	317 in 2005
Chucmichén	54 in 2005
San Antonio Cámara	226 in 2005
Temax	6130 in 2005

== Local festivals ==
Every year on the last Sunday in January the town holds a celebration for the Virgin of the Immaculate Conception.

== Tourist attractions ==
The tourist attractions of Temax include several churches. The church and former convent of San Miguel Archangel was built in the seventeenth century whereas the Chapel of San José, Chapel of Santa Bárbara, Chapel of San Román and the Chapel of la Ermita were all built in the eighteenth century. The Hacienda Chenché de las Torres also dates from the eighteenth century. It is within the Temax Municipality and it is one of the properties that thrived during the nineteenth century when there was henequen boom to supply additional ropes.

== Bibliography ==
- Joseph, Gilbert M.; Henderson, Timothy J. (1 January 2009). The Mexico Reader: History, Culture, Politics. Duke University Press. ISBN 0-8223-8409-4.
