= Graciano Ricalde Gamboa =

Mexican mathematician

Graciano Ricalde reads from his personal library

Mauro Graciano Ricalde Gamboa (November 21, 1873 – November 9, 1942) was a Mexican mathematician.

Ricalde Gamboa was born in Hoctún, state of Yucatan, Mexico. Son of Don Ambrosio Ricalde Moguel and Isidra Gamboa and studied at Hocabá until 1885, the year he received a scholarship to the Normal School for teachers of the State in the city of Mérida. He graduated as a teacher at the age of 16 years, and because of his young age, was granted special permission by the State Congress.

He studied accounting and for several years was a professor of commercial arithmetic books and accounts at the School of Commerce of Mérida. For the purpose of continuing his education, he studied civil engineering at the Institute for Literature of the state of Yucatan, under the wise leadership of Manuel Cepeda Sales. At that time, facing the danger of a collapse of one of the towers of the Cathedral of Yucatan, the authorities asked professor Sales Cepeda to assist in determining the weight of the church bell that had been ignored. The teacher passed the problem on to Ricalde Gamboa who did the calculations exactly. Since then he was appointed a professor of rational arithmetic at the Institute where he studied. For various reasons he could no longer continue his desire to study engineering, but soon after, in 1902, he was appointed professor and later director of his own engineering school, a position he continued until 1905 when he resigned to devote himself to the studies of mathematics and became a correspondent for various specialized institutions abroad.

He assembled a large library of over 5000 titles and was a collaborator of the French academic journal L'Intermédiaire des Mathématiciens, published in Paris in the early twentieth century. He was also interested in astronomy. He worked on various research projects in the city of Mérida to his death in 1942 the victim of a throat infection.

== Career ==
He achieved recognition for having calculated in 1910 the orbit dish of Halley's Comet. In 1923 he precisely calculated the solar eclipse that year and became part of the Mexican Geodetic Commission who observed and studied in Champotón in the state of Campeche.

He discovered a method for solving the quintic equation by using elliptic functions. He was invited to work as a professor in several foreign schools, which he never accepted, preferring to remain in his homeland dedicating himself to his studies and to organize accounting systems of industrial enterprises seeking professional services

== Awards ==
The municipal library of Hoctún was called Graciano Ricalde Gamboa after the "favorite son of the village". In the town of Ticopó, in the municipality of Acanceh, Yucatan, a high school is named after the mathematician. In 2006, an award for Science and Mathematics was named in his honor.

== Resolution of Algebraic Equations: Degree 5 by Elliptic Functions ==
One of the problems that have troubled most the mathematicians of all times is the resolution of algebraic equations of all grades. Such solutions were found for polynomial equations of degree 3 and 4 by Cardano and Ferrari in the 16th century. For polynomial equations of degree 5 and more, it was proven by Abel and Galois that the solution cannot be expressed in terms of radicals (meaning the roots cannot necessarily be expressed). However, there are other ways one can solve such equations. Hermite instead found a solution involving certain functions in advanced calculus that are called elliptic functions. (They generalize trig functions and are related to elliptic curves and originally to the problem of calculating the perimeter of an ellipse.) His solution was simplified and clarified by Kronecker and Klein.

Among Ricalde's greatest accomplishments is that of his contribution to the resolution of the general equation of 5th-degree grade by elliptic functions, a feat that is analyzed and evaluated in the second part of this biography in Enciclopedia Yucanense IV, 1944. Additionally, Ricalde corresponded in a French question-and-answer journal called L'Intermédiaire des mathématiciens. In one entry that was published in circa 1898 (Graciano would have been 25 years of age), he asked about solving the quintic equation. More specifically, his question was about reducing the general quintic equation to the reduced Bring-Jerrard form (to solve the Bring-Jerrard equation requires elliptic functions). However, in modern mathematical literature, Ricalde is rarely cited. A citation in the arXiv (funded by Cornell University) is a review by Lemmermeyer concerning another algebra problem called Pell's equation. (Lemmermeyer includes Ricalde in a list of people who solved special cases of Pell's equation, citing the 1901 issue of L'Intermédiaire des Mathématiciens).

Since there are no radical solutions to polynomial equations of degrees greater than 4, roots cannot necessarily be expressed. Also, for applications in science and engineering, “solving an equation” usually means “finding a close approximation of a solution”. For example, if there is a real number which solves this equation, it can be said that it lies somewhere between 1.16730398 and 1.16730399. One can provide more precision, but obtaining the full decimal expansion of the solution remains impossible. The code can still make the right decision, and a bridge will still hold if it is a sufficiently accurate approximation. Today's computers also solve polynomial equations by using iterative approximation techniques.

== 1901 ==
He amazed the Scientist of the Intermediare Mathematicians of Paris, France with his solution to the Pell equation. Ricalde then accepted Professorship of the State College of Civil Engineering. In a moment of stillness and recollection, Graciano Ricalde remembers he was encouraged and led by Lic. and Eng. Capeda Manuel Sales, an eminent scientist Yucatan to begin his serious studies of actual mathematics.

== 1902 ==
Graciano joined his wife and life partner who was then, then a professor Srita Normal, Carmen Manzañilla Camomile. They bore four children, three boys and one girl, Alfonso, Humberto, Enrique and Ofelia who studied under the direction of the father, and mathematics. Enrique moved to New York City.

== 1910 ==
Graciano would be the first to correctly prove by precise calculation that neither the arrival of Halley's Comet or its tail would hit the earth extinguishing life. This was a tremendous concern of its day. His rigorous studies were so serious that he compiled his formulas in a booklet that had great resonance in the National Observatory of Paris.

== 1923 ==
Don Graciano accurately calculated the total eclipse of the sun of that year and joined the Mexican Commission Geodescica happened to observe at Champoton in the state of Campeche, for being there this total eclipse, in which the capital of the republic was seen as partial. But his greatest accomplishment is undoubtedly the resolution of the general equation of 5th-degree grade by elliptic functions, a feat that is analyzed and evaluated in the second part of this biography.

== November 9, 1942 ==
Graciano died in Mérida in the grand family home.

== January 18, 1943 ==
The National Academy of Sciences, Antonio Alzaate organized a mathematical exposition of the merits of Graciano Ricalde during the evening in the Palacio de Bellas Artes of Mexico City. The band played and speakers including Dr. Ruben Moreno Ricalde spoke that evening as chronicled and published in the Daily News.

== 1959 ==
A plaque was placed on the house where he was born in the little town of Hoctun. The Hoctun municipal library is called Ricalde Graciano Gamboa “in honor of the beloved son of the village”. In the town of Ticopo, Yucatan, the high school is named after the mathematician. There is a second school, I believe it is in Hocabá.

== 2016 ==
A plaque was presented and placed on Graciano Ricalde's professional residence by his nephew Arcadio Poveda. The home is now a boutique hotel in Mérida, Yucatán called Hotel Casa San Ángel.

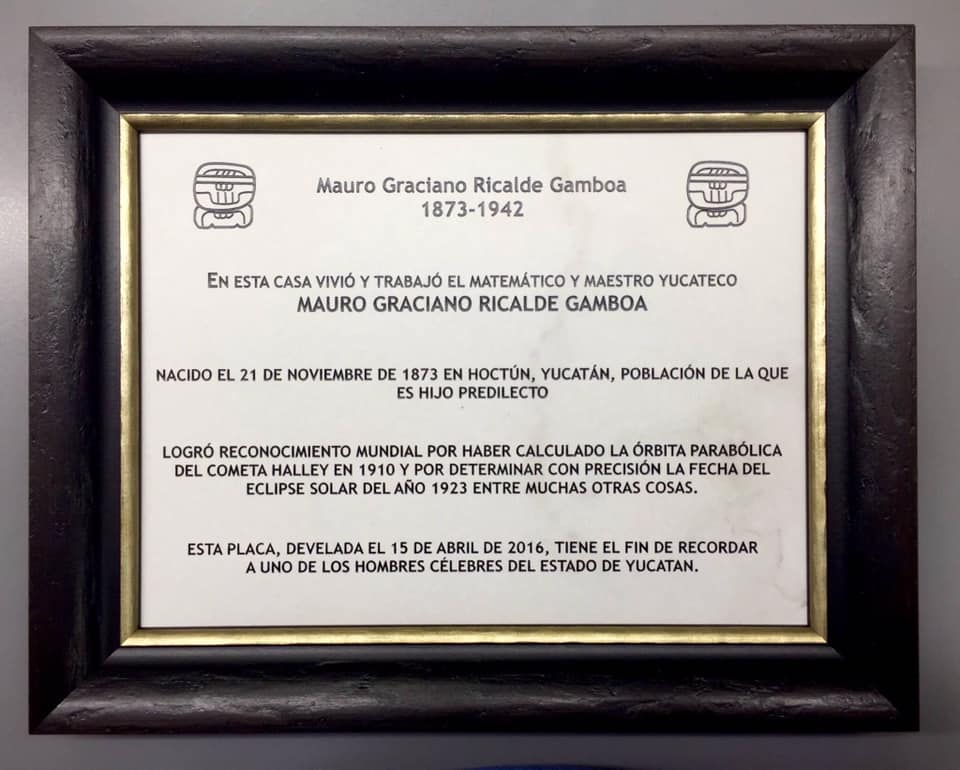
Exacting replica of the plaque mounted outside the Casa San Angel Boutique hotel.
