= Dziuché =

- Town
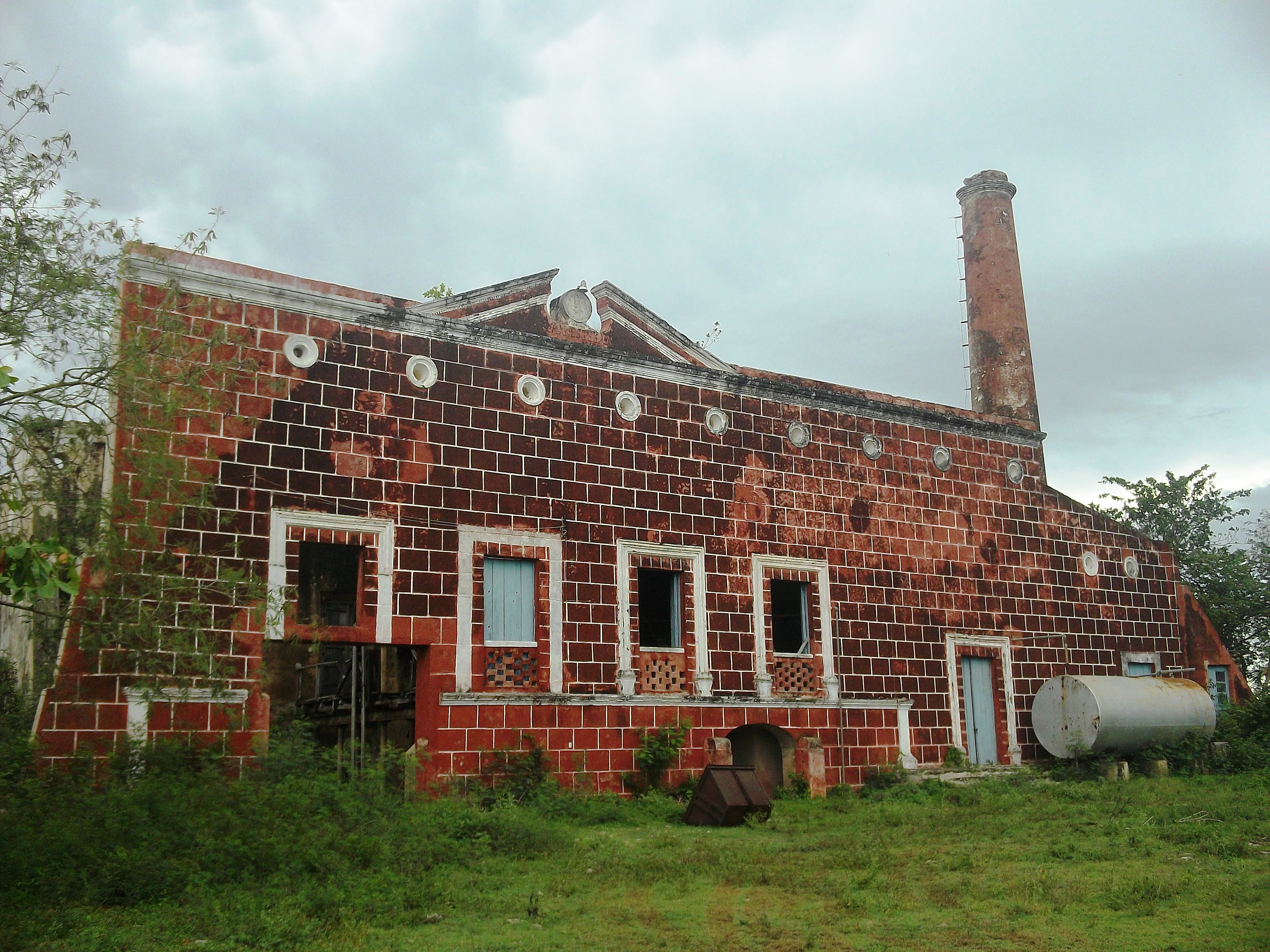

- Location of the Municipality in Mexico
- Coordinates: 20°54′44″N 89°11′47″W
- Country: Mexico
- State: Yucatán
- Municipality: Hoctún
- Elevation: 14 m (46 ft)

Population (2010)
  - Total: 10
- Time zone: UTC-5 (EST)
- INEGI Code: 310350004

Dziuché is a town located in the Hoctún Municipality in the State of Yucatán in the southeast of Mexico.

The town developed around an old hacienda. It had its splendor during the time of the henequen boom, between 1870 and 1920, and issued tokens which, due to their design, are of interest to numismatists. These tokens accredit the hacienda as the property of Juan Gamboa.

Later, the hacienda was acquired by Raymundo Cámara Luján, a wealthy landowner who reactivated the sugarcane industry in the Yucatán peninsula; in the period 1909-1910, for example, the Dziuché Hacienda produced some 12,000 kilograms of sugarcane and some 10,000 kilograms of honey.

In 1937, a socialist government headed by President Lázaro Cárdenas del Río expropriated the Haciendas from the traditional landowning families and transformed them into ejidos, an autonomous communal unit, with collective right to land ownership.

After the government expropriated the land around the hacienda from the Cámara family in 1937, the sugarcane mill was abandoned and Dzuinché stopped being the economic powerhouse it had once been. As a result, the town which once housed tens of thousands of laborers now has a population of only ten people.

== Image Gallery ==
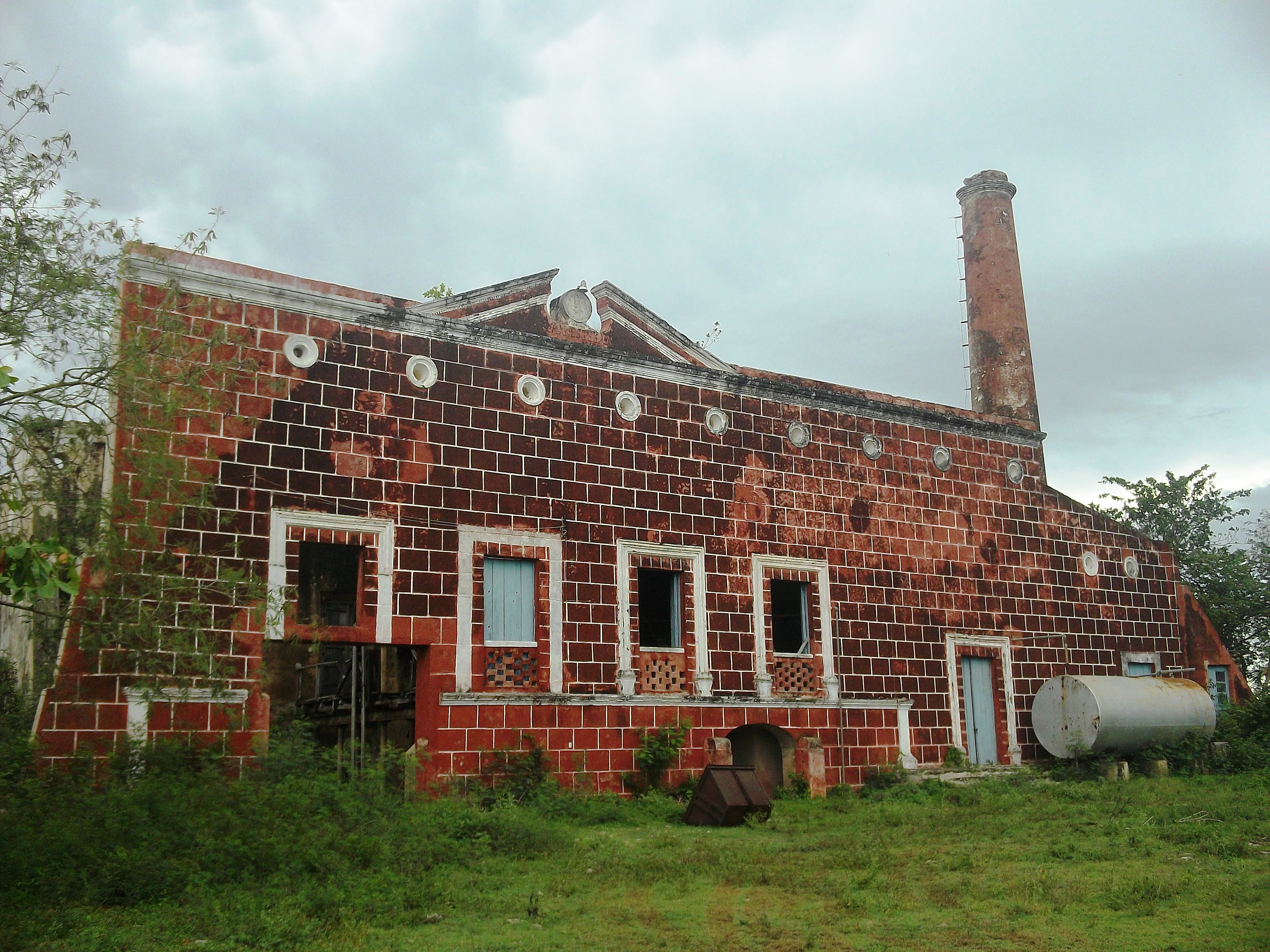

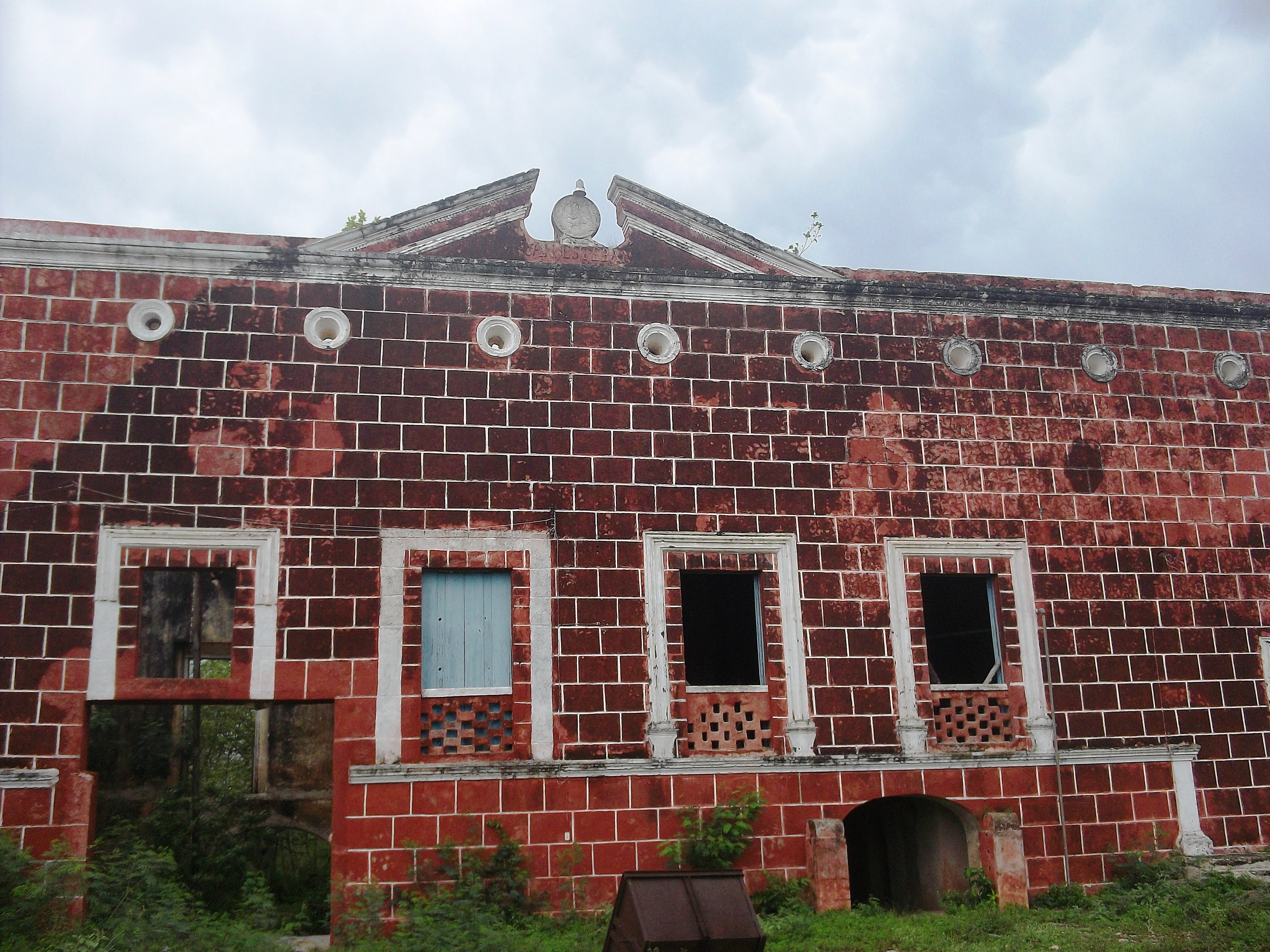

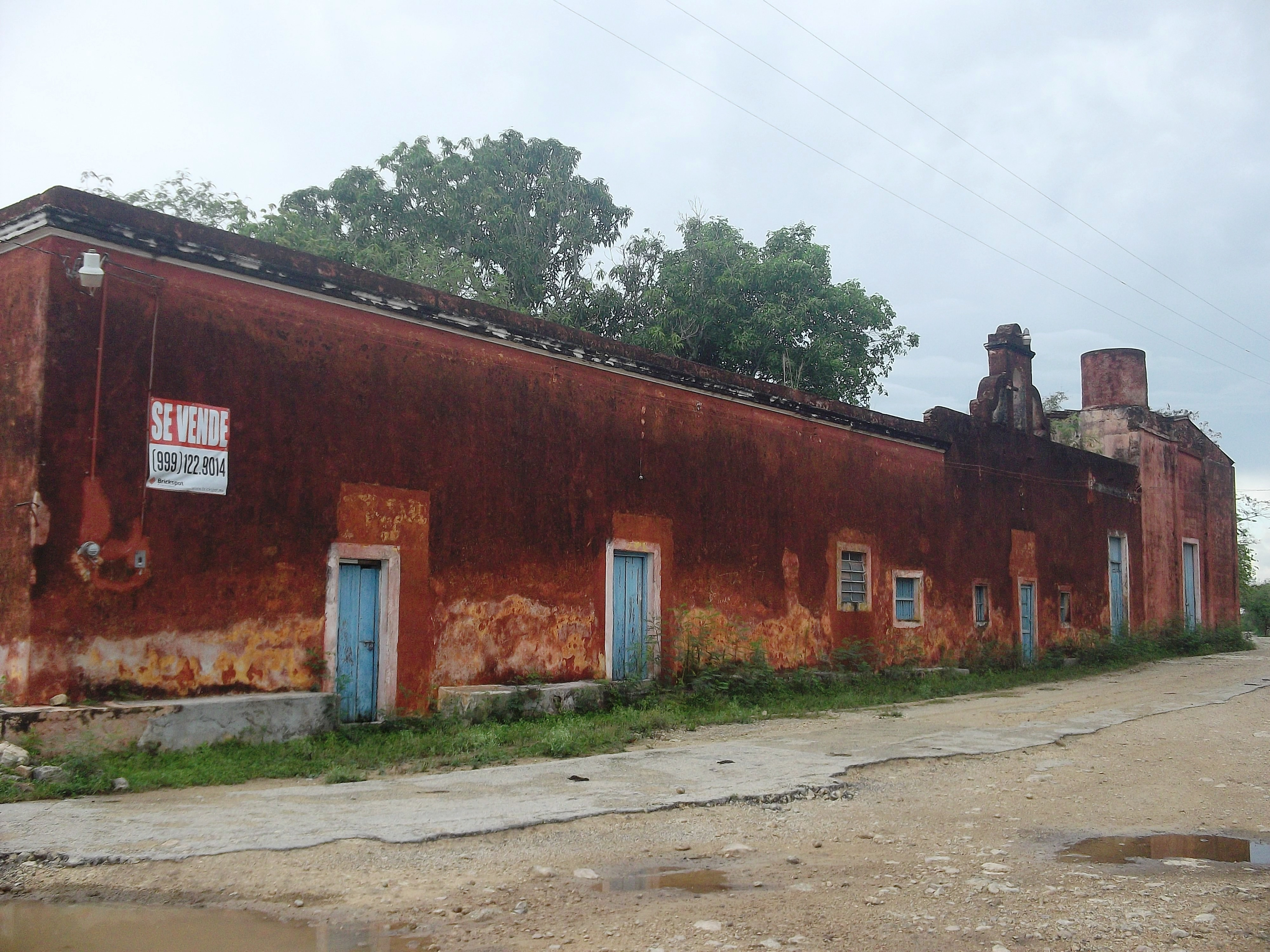

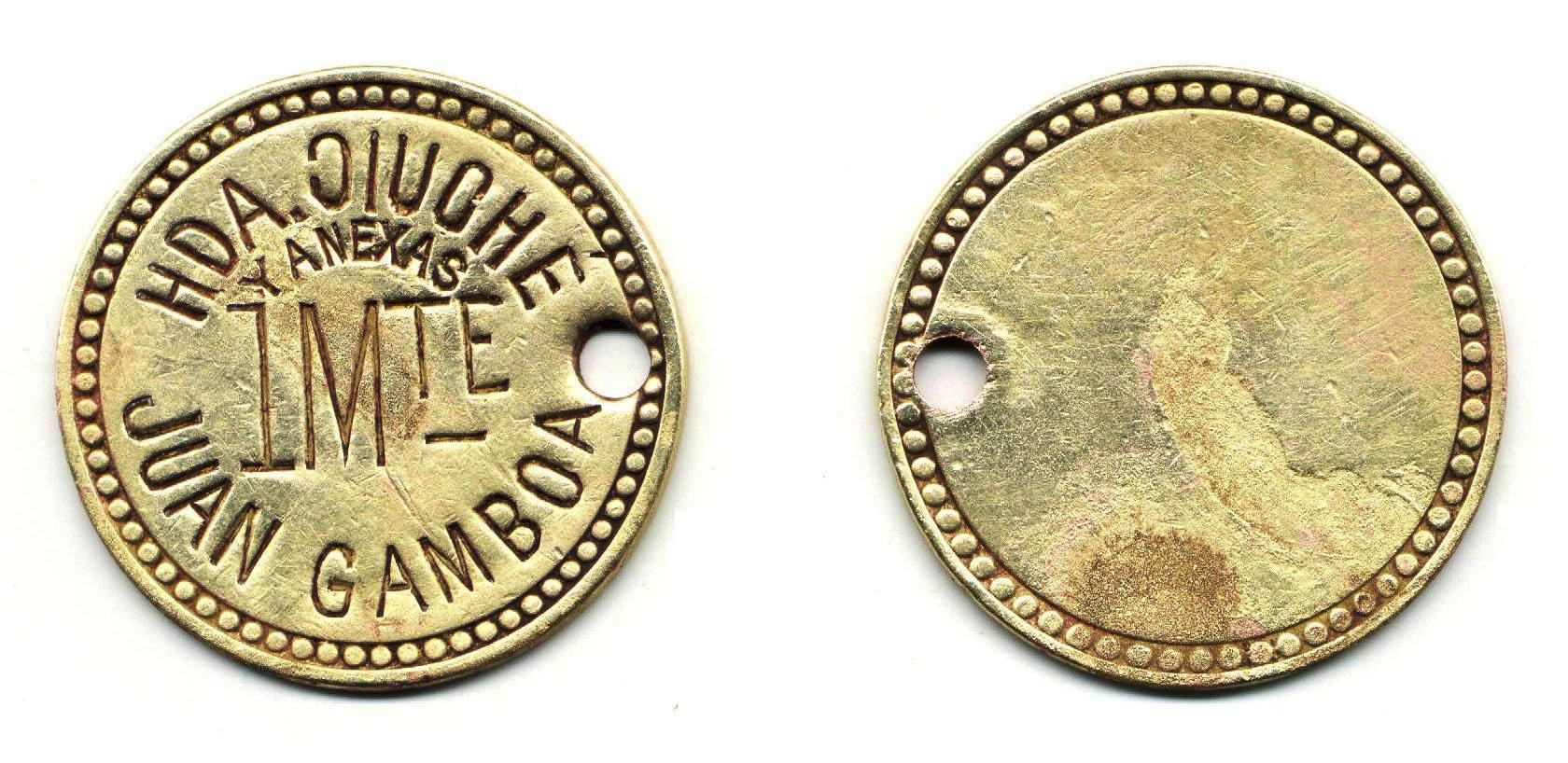

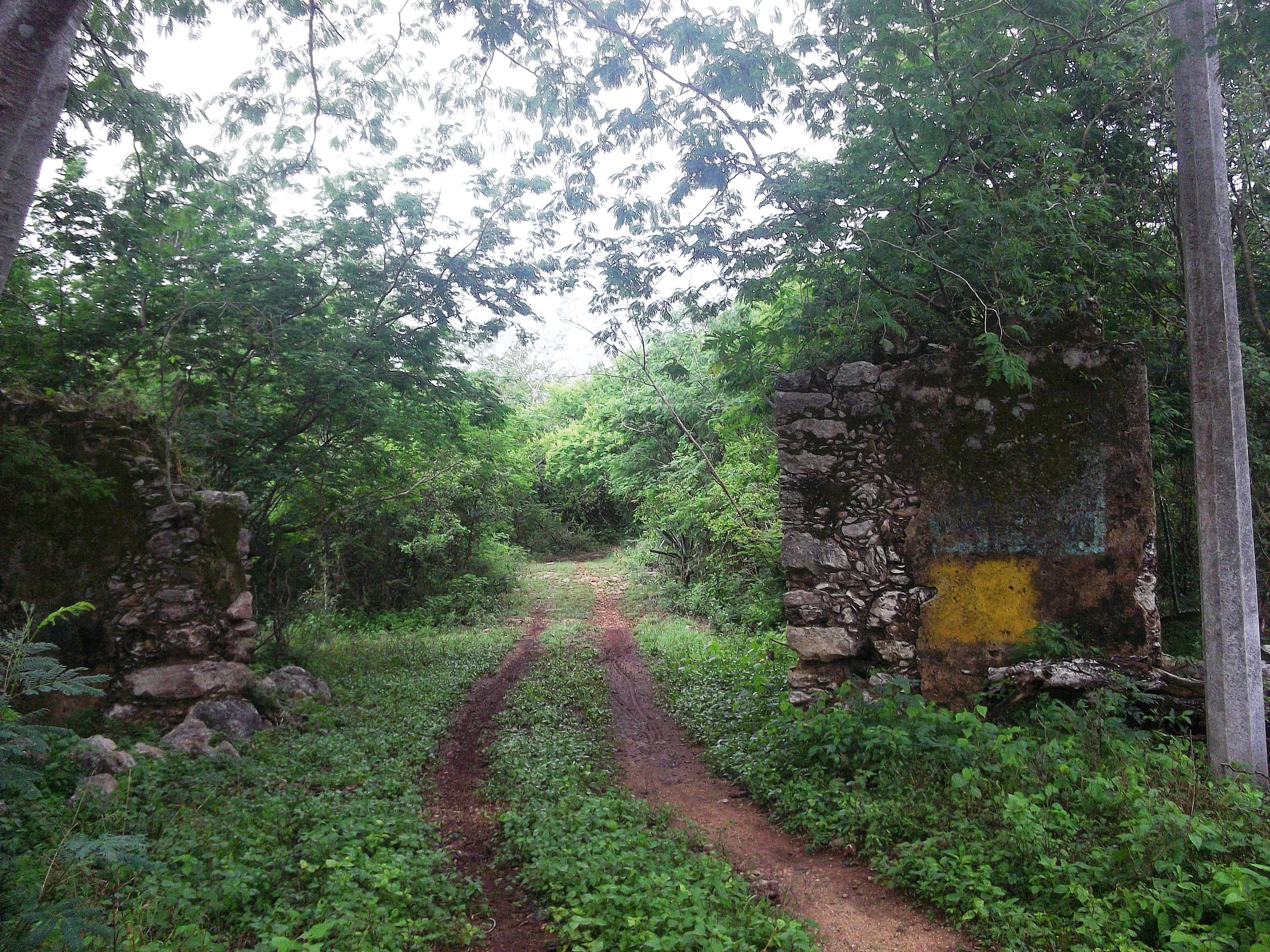
