= Hoctún Municipality =

Municipality in the Mexican state of Yucatán

Hoctún
- Municipality
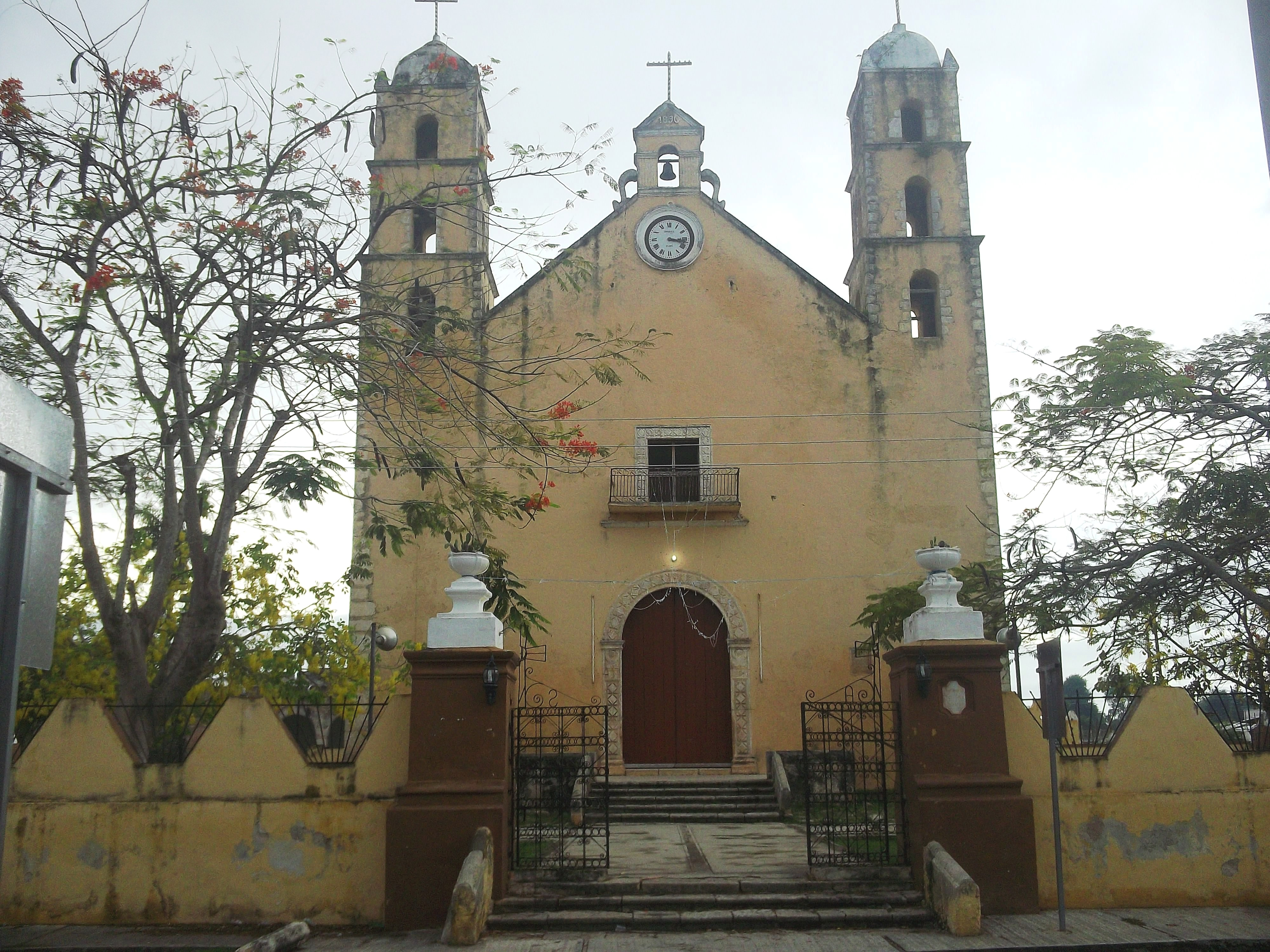
- Principal Church of Hoctún, Yucatán

- Coat of arms

- Region 3 Centro #035

- Location of the Municipality in Mexico
- Coordinates: 20°51′52″N 89°12′07″W
- Country: Mexico
- State: Yucatán

Government
  - Type: 2012–2015
  - Municipal President: Flor Mireya Acosta Novelo

Area
  - Total: 123.91 km^{2} (47.84 sq mi)
- Elevation: 14 m (46 ft)

Population (2010)
  - Total: 5,697
- Time zone: UTC-6 (Central Standard Time)
- INEGI Code: 009
- Major Airport: Merida (Manuel Crescencio Rejón) International Airport
- IATA Code: MID
- ICAO Code: MMMD

Hoctún Municipality (Spanish pronunciation: [xoɣˈtun], in the Yucatec Maya Language: “where the stone is quarried or ripped”) is a municipality in the Mexican state of Yucatán containing 123.91 km^{2} of land and located roughly 45 km east of the city of Mérida.

== History ==
There are no records indicating the history of pre-Hispanic times for this area. After the conquest the area became part of the encomienda system. Doña Angela de la Fleguera Castillo was the encomendera in 1722 and was in charge of 269 native inhabitants.

Yucatán declared its independence from the Spanish Crown in 1821 and in 1825, the area was assigned to the Beneficios Bajos region with its headquarters in Sotuta. In 1889, Hoctún acquired the category of Villa.

== Governance ==
The municipal president is elected for a three-year term. The town council has seven aldermen, who serve as Secretary of the Town Hall; and councilors of markets, public lighting, potable water, parks and gardens, ecology and cemeteries.

The Municipal Council administers the business of the municipality. It is responsible for budgeting and expenditures and producing all required reports for all branches of the municipal administration. Annually it determines educational standards for schools.

The Police Commissioners ensure public order and safety. They are tasked with enforcing regulations, distributing materials and administering rulings of general compliance issued by the council.

== Communities ==
The head of the municipality is Hoctún, Yucatán. The other populated areas in the municipality are Dziuché, Hacienda Petenchi Pich, San Antonio Cholul, San Isidro Ochil, San José Oriente, San José Poniente, San Isidro Ochil, San Miguel, and San Nicolás. The significant populations are shown below:

Community	Population
Entire Municipality (2010)	5,697
Dziuché	10 in 2005
Hoctún	4739 in 2005
San José Oriente	827 in 2005

== Local festivals ==
Every year from 15 to 31 May 31 a festival in honor of the Virgin of the Immaculate Conception is held; from 15 July to 6 August a celebration for the Holy Christ of the Transfiguration is held; and from the 25 to 29 September a festival honors St. Michael the Archangel.

== Notable people ==
- Domingo María Moguel, (1848–1932) music teacher who taught at the Liceo de Merida and directed the orchestra.
- Graciano Ricalde Gamboa, (1873–1942) mathematician

== Tourist attractions ==
- Church of St. Michael the Archangel, built in the colonial era
- Church of San Lorenzo, built in the eighteenth century
- archaeological site at Holactún
- Hacienda Dziuché
- Hacienda San José Poniente is a Bed and Breakfast that is located in Hoctun.
