= L'Intermédiaire des mathématiciens =

- Discipline: Mathematics
- Language: French
- Edited by: Émile Lemoine

Publication details
- History: 1894–1925
- Publisher: Gauthier-Villars et fils (France)

Standard abbreviations
- ISO 4: Interméd. Math.

Indexing
- OCLC no.: 504209870

L'Intermédiaire des mathématiciens was a peer-reviewed scientific journal covering mathematics published by Gauthier-Villars et fils. It was established in 1894 by Émile Lemoine and Charles-Ange Laisant and was published until 1920. A second series started in 1922 and was published until 1925.
