= Hocabá Municipality =

Municipality in the Mexican state of Yucatán

Hocabá
- Municipality
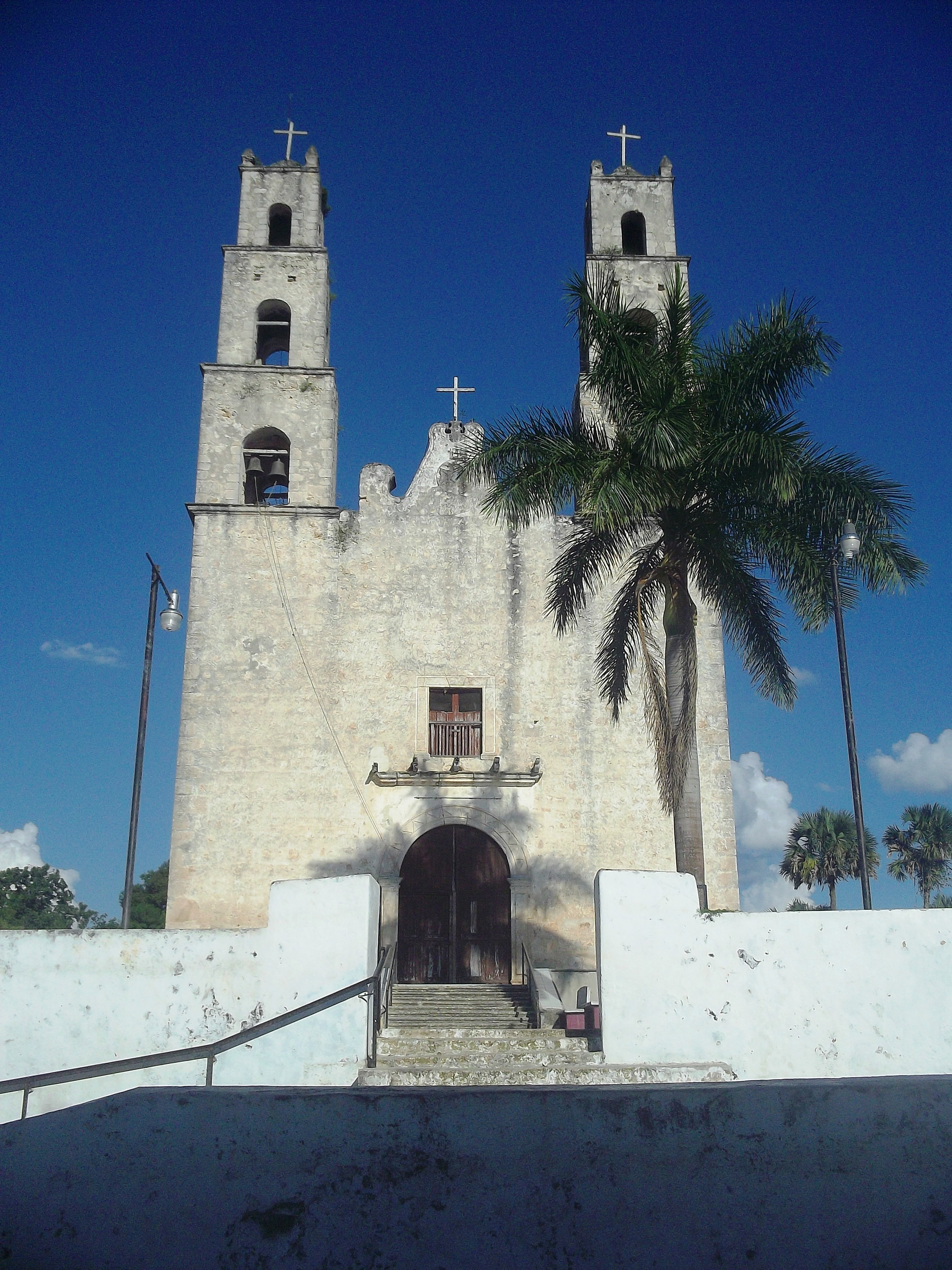
- Principal Church of Hocabá, Yucatán

- Municipal location in Yucatán

- Location of the Municipality in Mexico
- Coordinates: 20°48′56″N 89°14′42″W
- Country: Mexico
- State: Yucatán

Government
  - Type: 2012–2015
  - Municipal President: Eulogio Dzib Tun

Area
  - Total: 81.75 km^{2} (31.56 sq mi)
- Elevation: 14 m (46 ft)

Population (2010)
  - Total: 6,061
- Time zone: UTC-6 (Central Standard Time)
- INEGI Code: 034
- Major Airport: Merida (Manuel Crescencio Rejón) International Airport
- IATA Code: MID
- ICAO Code: MMMD

Hocabá Municipality (In the Yucatec Maya Language: “picking plums”) is a municipality in the Mexican state of Yucatán containing 81.75 square kilometres (31.56 sq mi) of land and located roughly 45 kilometres (28 mi) southeast of the city of Mérida.

== History ==
During pre-Hispanic times, the area was part of the chieftainship of Hocabail-Humúny. After the conquest the area became part of the encomienda system. In 1549, the encomendero for Hocabá was Gaspar Pacheco and it was later assigned to Pedro Alvarez.

Yucatán declared its independence from the Spanish Crown in 1821 and in 1825, the area was assigned to the Beneficios Bajos region with its headquarters in Sotuta. In 1900 Hocabá was elevated to village, which included administration of Sahcabá and Sanahcat. In 1922, the estate San Juan was withdrawn from the municipality and in 1924, the relationship with Sanahcat was severed. In 1937, the Hacienda Tixcacal Ancona and Hacienda Xtohil were added to the municipality.

== Governance ==
The municipal president is elected for a three-year term. The town council has nine councilpersons, who serve as Secretary and councilors of educational programs, culture and sports; public lighting; health and social assistance; public image; markets and roads; public works; public monuments; and nomenclature.

The Municipal Council administers the business of the municipality. It is responsible for budgeting and expenditures and producing all required reports for all branches of the municipal administration. Annually it determines educational standards for schools.

The Police Commissioners ensure public order and safety. They are tasked with enforcing regulations, distributing materials and administering rulings of general compliance issued by the council.

== Geography ==
=== Climate ===
The Yucatan Peninsula, which is to the south of the Tropic of Cancer, exhibits a tropical climate with mean annual temperature of 25 °C (77 °F), which is also the annual mean temperature recorded at Hocabá within this peninsula. As against an annual precipitation range of 500–1,500 millimetres (20–59 in) in the peninsula, the rainfall recorded in Hocabá is 980 millimetres (39 in), which is unpredictable and occurs during the rainy period that lasts from October to May.

=== Soil ===
Hocabá has calcareous soil which is in red and black colour. Kankab soil that has a reddish-brown colour is also found. These soil types are high in calcium carbonate. The area also has formations that are relatively rocky and are considered poor for farming. Under these soil conditions the land-use in the area consists of forests, home gardening, and short term farming (two to four years). The crops grown are maize, beans, and pumpkins.

== Communities ==
The head of the municipality is Hocabá, Yucatán. The other populated areas are Hacienda Buenavista, Jesús, Sahcabá, Salaactún, San Antonio, San Juan Evia, and Temozón. The significant populations are shown below:

Community	Population
Entire Municipality (2010)	6,061
Hocabá	3990 in 2005
Sahcabá	1829 in 2005

== Local festivals ==
Every year from 23 to 30 September a celebration in honor of St. Francis of Assisi is held.

== Tourist attractions ==
- Church of St. Francis of Assisi
- Church of San Cristóbal built in the 17th century
- Hacienda Buenavista
- Hacienda Xucú

The two towers in the facade of the Church of St. Francis of Assisi, dated to 1764, has stucco escutcheon and a theme of a pastern of stars. There are paintings along the long nave many of which are of saints including that of Saint Francis, the patron saint of Hocabá and also of the Saint Anthony of Padua. The altar is in a very good condition, its pilasters are gilded and carved with flower designs and is set with an ivory background. The pediment in the façade has a scrolled crest. There is spiral staircase to approach the roof of the church.

There is another church Hocabá called the "ermita of Sana Cruz" which has a chapel and a belfry. The nave has no roof.

== Bibliography ==
- Alcantara, Edith Aguila (2007). Soil Fertility in Calcareous Tropical Soils from Yucatan, Mexico, and Villa Clara, Cuba, Affected by Land Use and Soil Moisture Effects. Cuvillier Verlag. ISBN 978-3-86727-143-1.
- Perry, Richard D.; Perry, Rosalind (2002). Maya Missions: Exploring Colonial Yucatan. Espada├▒a Press. ISBN 978-0-9620811-9-4.
