= Abalá Municipality =

Municipality in the Mexican state of Yucatán

Abalá
- Municipality
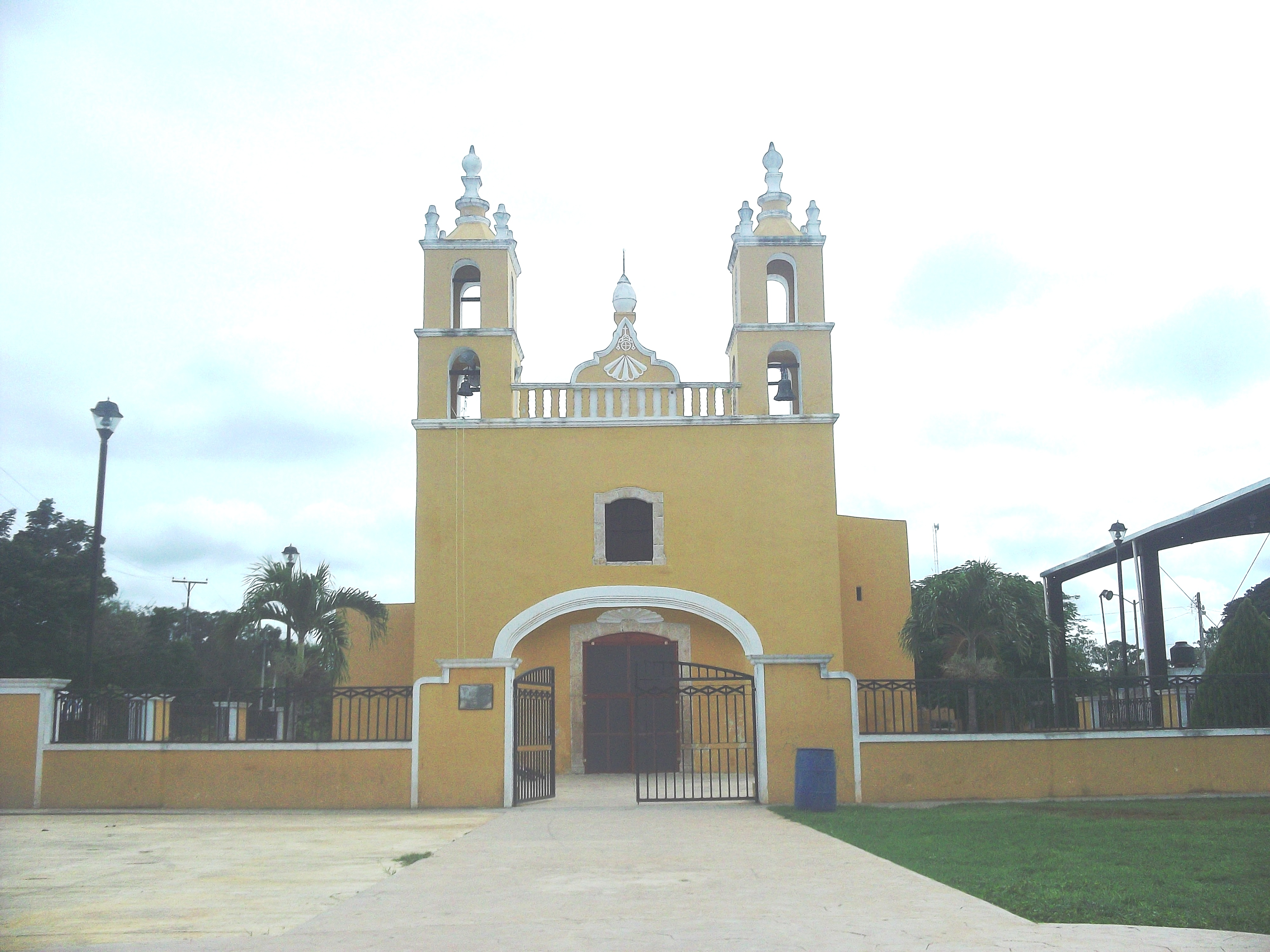
- Church of Abalá, Yucatán

- Region 2 Noroeste #001

- Location of the Municipality in Mexico
- Coordinates: 20°38′48″N 89°40′47″W
- Country: Mexico
- State: Yucatán

Government
  - Type: 2012–2015
  - Municipal President: Jose Candelario Ac Canche

Area
  - Total: 301.45 km^{2} (116.39 sq mi)
- Elevation: 6 m (20 ft)

Population (2005)
  - Total: 5,976
- Time zone: UTC-6 (Central Standard Time)
- INEGI Code: 001
- Major Airport: Merida (Manuel Crescencio Rejón) International Airport
- IATA Code: MID
- ICAO Code: MMMD

Abalá Municipality (In the Yucatec Maya Language: “Place of the plum juice”) is a municipality in the Mexican state of Yucatán containing 301.45 km^{2} of land and located roughly 50 km south of the city of Mérida.

== History ==
After the conquest, during the colonial period, the Municipality of Abalá was founded as an encomienda first for Francisco de Montejo the Younger in 1549 and then in 1607 for Juan de Montejo Maldonado. The right to press the natives into labor then passed in 1632 to Conde-Duque of San Lucas, in 1633 to the Countess of Olivares, in 1699 to Mariana de Guzmán Duchess of Medina Cidoña, and in 1727 to Doña Josefa Díaz Bolio who had control of 211 Indians.

In the modern era, the haciendas Maxal y Kambriche became part of the Muna Municipality on 18 April 1902.

On 20 January 1926, the cocoa farm and ranch Yaxcopoil are incorporated into the town of Umán but a decade later on 17 January 1936, the cocoa farm was restored to Abalá municipality.

== Governance ==
The municipal president is elected for a three-year term. Four aldermen—Secretary, public works, nomenclature, and ecology—also serve on the town council.

== Communities ==
The municipality is made up of 7 communities:

Community	Population
Entire Municipality (2010)	6,356
Abalá	1797 in 2005
Cacao	261 in 2005
Mucuyché	454 in 2005
Peba	275 in 2005
Sihunchén	336 in 2005
Temozón	716 in 2005
Uayalceh	2122 in 2005

== Local festivals ==
Every year from 10 to 17 May, Abalá holds a fiesta celebrating the Virgin Mary.

== Tourist attractions ==
- Cave/Cenote Kankirixché
- Hacienda Nuestra Señora de la Soledad Pebá
- Hacienda San Pedro Ochil
- Hacienda Temozón Sur
- Hacienda Uayalceh
- Hacienda Cacao

== Notable people ==
- Daniel Ayala Pérez
