= Hacienda Cacao =

- Village
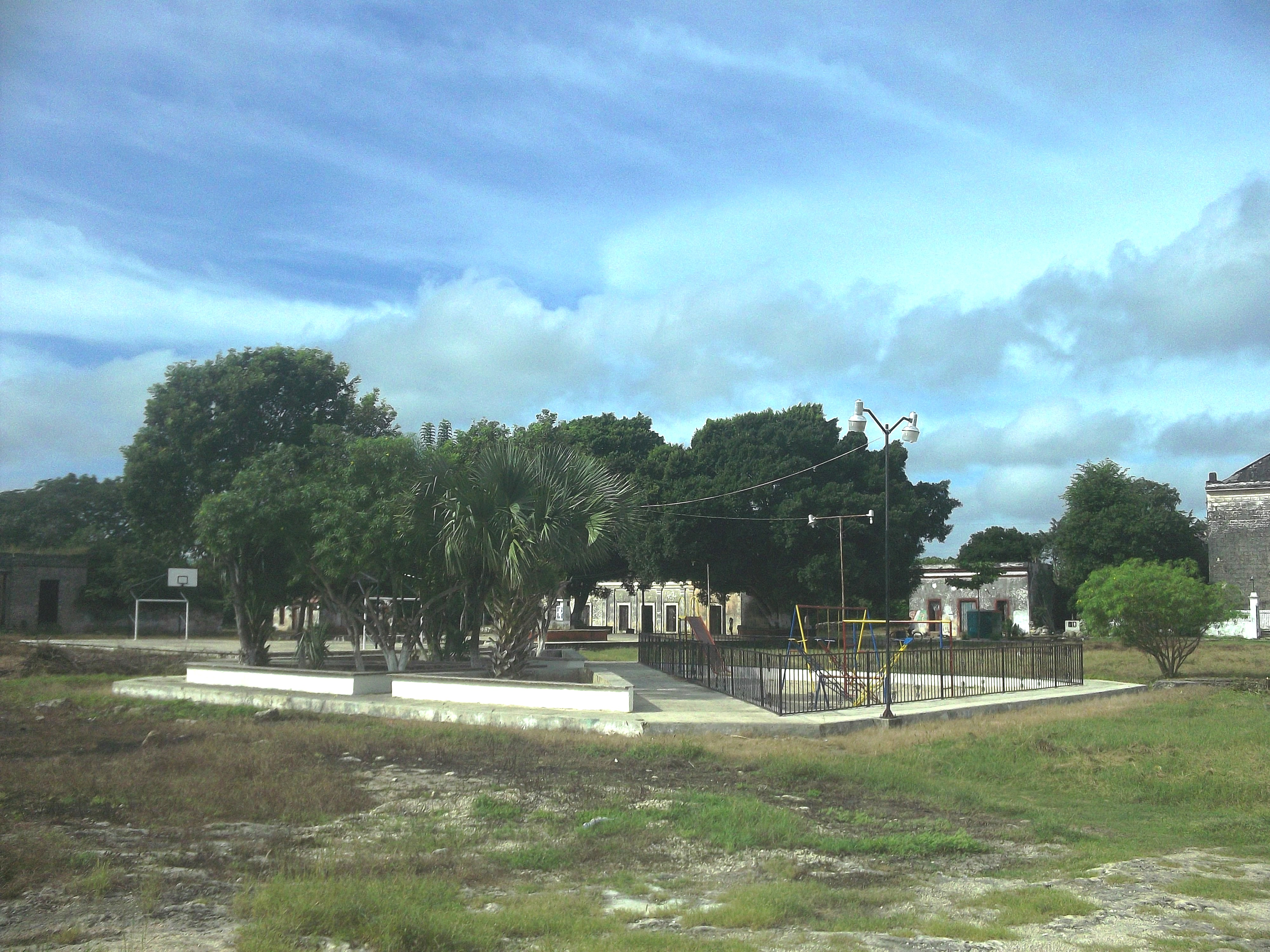
- Principal park at Cacao

- Location in Mexico
- Coordinates: 20°41′34″N 89°44′47″W
- Country: Mexico
- Mexican States: Yucatán
- Municipalities: Abalá
- Time zone: UTC−6 (CST)
  - Summer (DST): UTC−5 (CDT)
- Postal code: 97826
- Area code: 988

Hacienda Cacao is located off the Carretera Uman-Hopelceh (Uman-Hopelceh highway) within Abalá Municipality, Mexico, and is in the South West Region 8 area of the State of Yucatán. It is one of the properties that arose during the nineteenth century henequen boom, and was owned by José María Ponce.

== Toponymy ==
Cacao comes from ka'kaw, which in the Mayan language means "cocoa" (Theobroma cacao).

== History ==
The hacienda was built by José María Ponce who issued his own hacienda tokens of special design in 1889 which are highly prized by coin collectors. Ponce grew henequén on the plantation, was considered a master at marketing sisal fiber, and used his profits for operating an ice factory, a chocolate factory and a brewery.

In 1918, at a fiesta held at the hacienda for the community, troubadour Enrique Galaz Chacón composed his first song, a bolero called Madrigal, which is the first known Yucatecan bolero.

In 1923 or 1924 the caretaker, his wife and 20 workers on the hacienda were killed by a group of outlaws led by the notorious bandit Braulio Euán, a personal friend of the Governor, José María Iturralde Traconis(es).

X'batún Cave is located south of the city of Mérida in a tiny village called San Antonio Mulix, bordering on the grounds of -and just down the road from - the former hacienda Cacao. The cave is 100 meters with an input 3.60 meters wide and 2.50 meters high. Access to the cave was sealed by a wall of dry stones placed together, which is now collapsed. The presence of complete human bones and fragments was noted by archeologists, as well as several fragments of vessels. The final chamber has a body of water 15 meters long. In this section were found 24 skulls and various bones.

- In 1921 its name was changed to Cacán Cacau.
- In 1930 its name was changed to Cacao and jurisdiction passed from the municipality of Abalá to Uman.
- In 1936 jurisdiction returned to the town Abalá.

== Demographics ==
All of the henequen plantations ceased to exist as autonomous communities with the agrarian land reform implemented by President Lazaro Cardenas in 1937. His decree turned the haciendas into collective ejidos, leaving only 150 hectares to the former landowners for use as private property. Figures before 1937 indicate populations living on the farm. After 1937, figures indicate those living in the community, as the remaining Hacienda Cacao houses only the owner's immediate family.

According to the 2005 census conducted by the INEGI, the population of the city was 261 inhabitants, of whom 142 were men and 119 were women.

Population of Cacao by year
Year	1900	1910	1921	1930	1940	1950	1960	1970	1980	1990	1995	2000	2005
Population	312	345	351	199	233	359	400	435	442	234	206	235	261

== Gallery ==
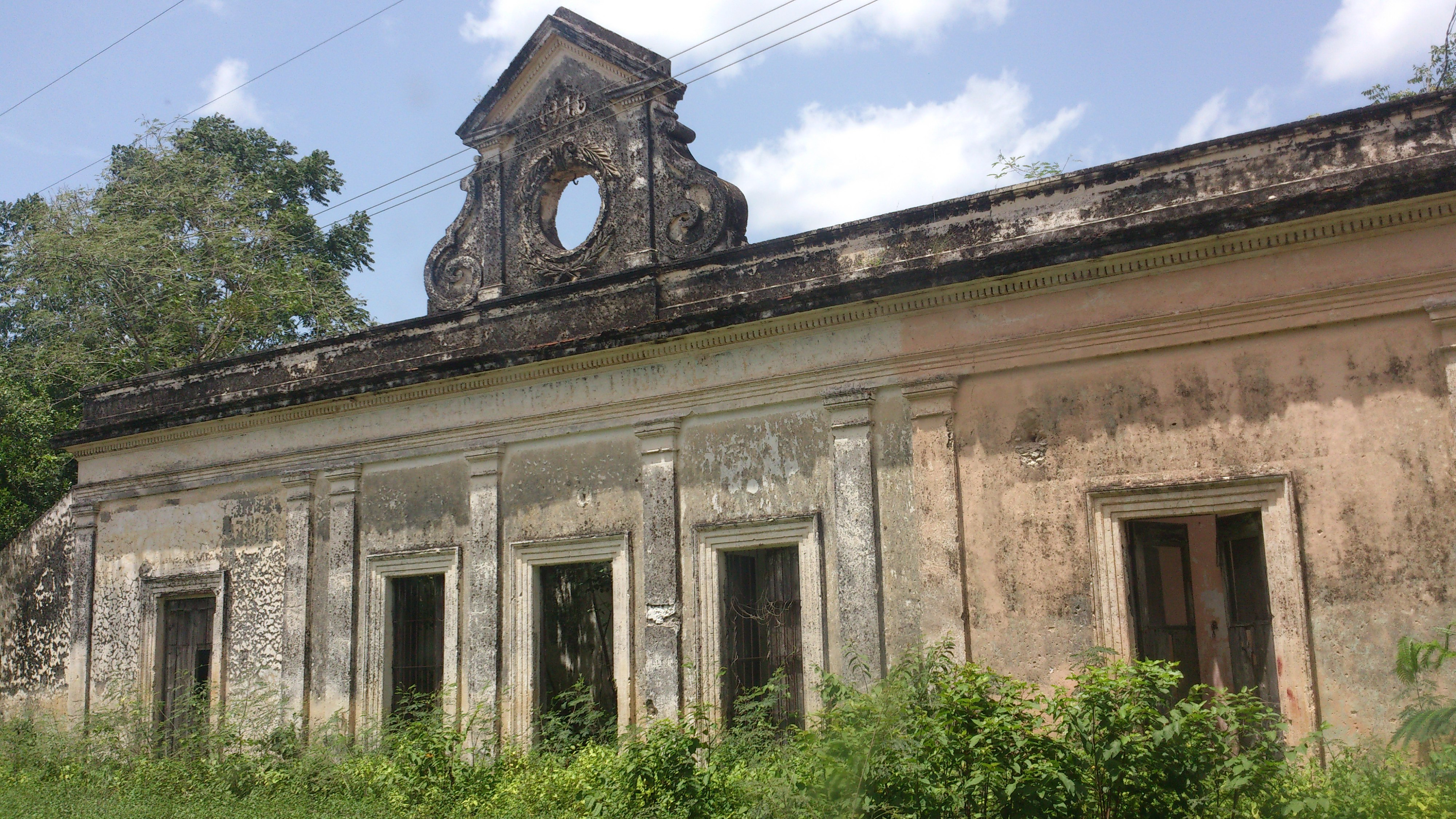
Ruins of the Hacienda

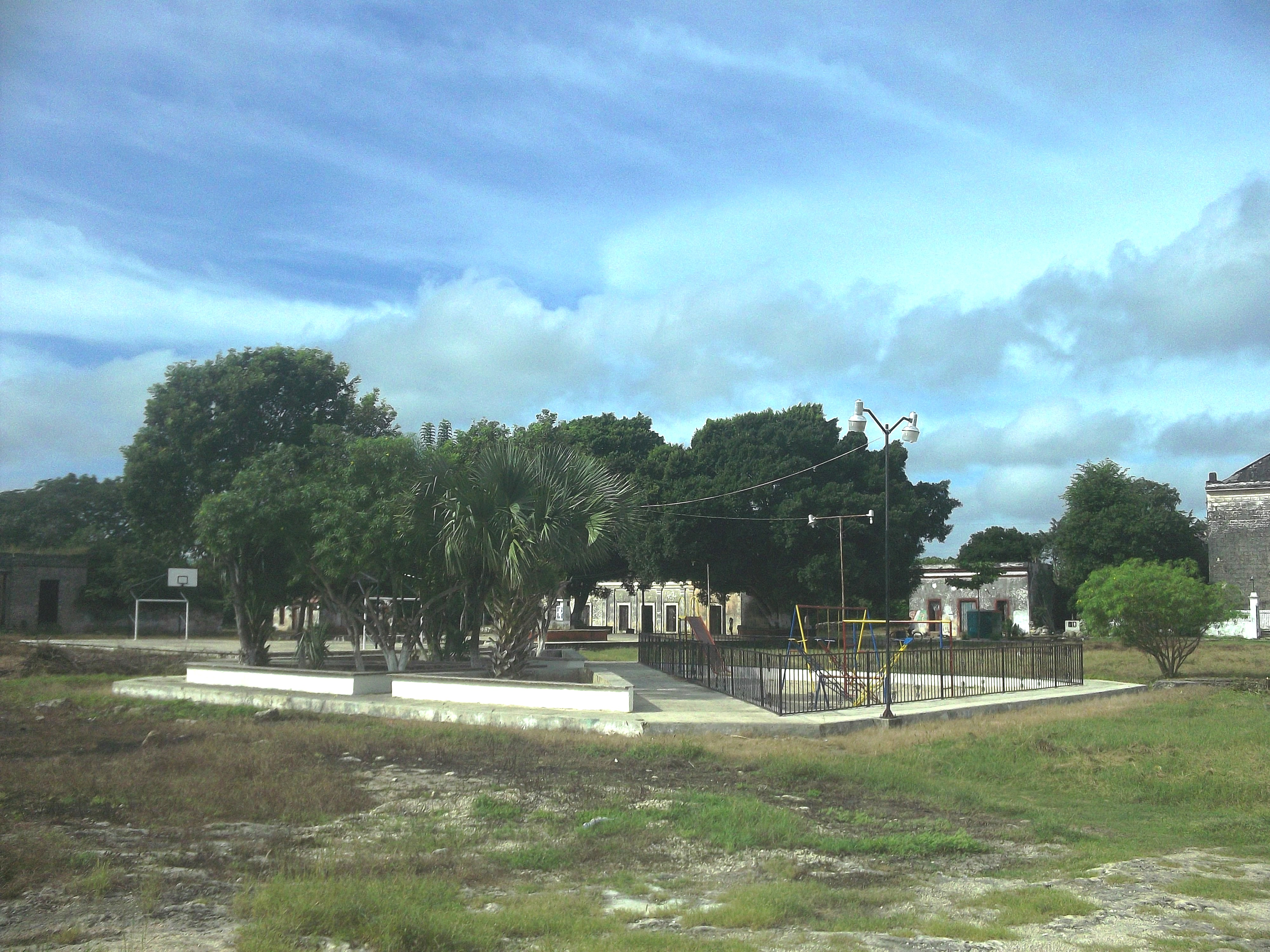
Principal park at Cacao

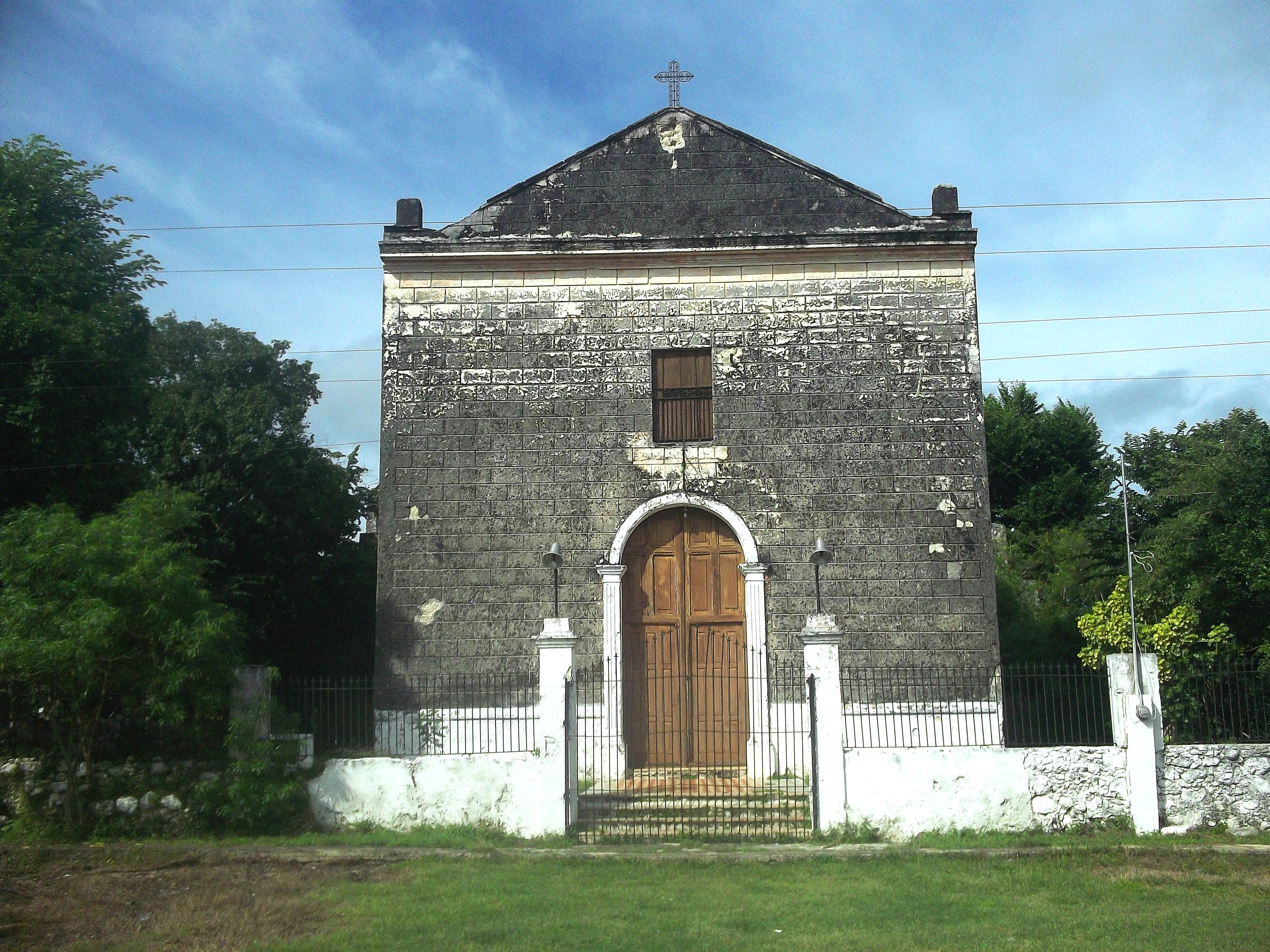
Cacao Church

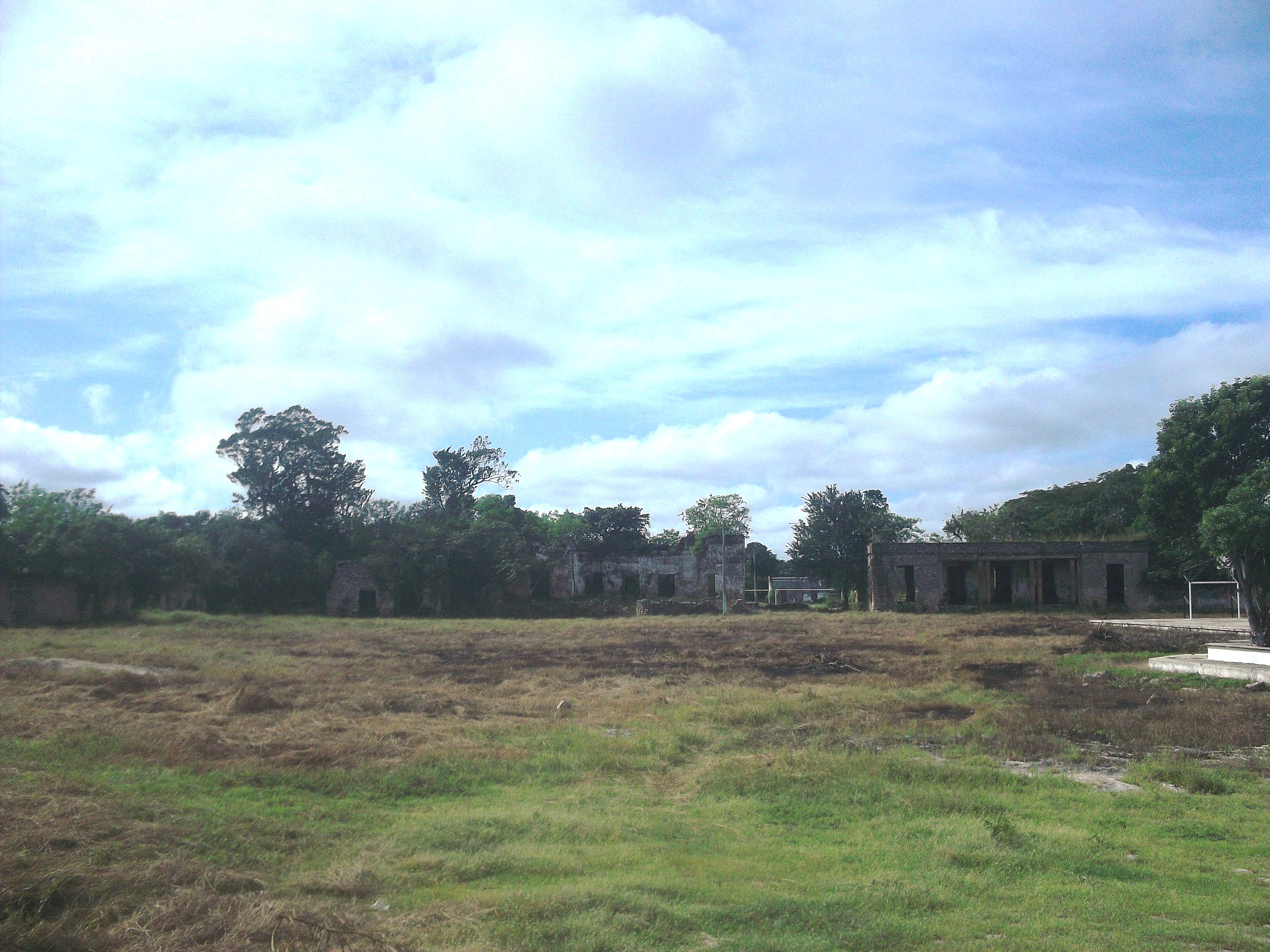
Hacienda

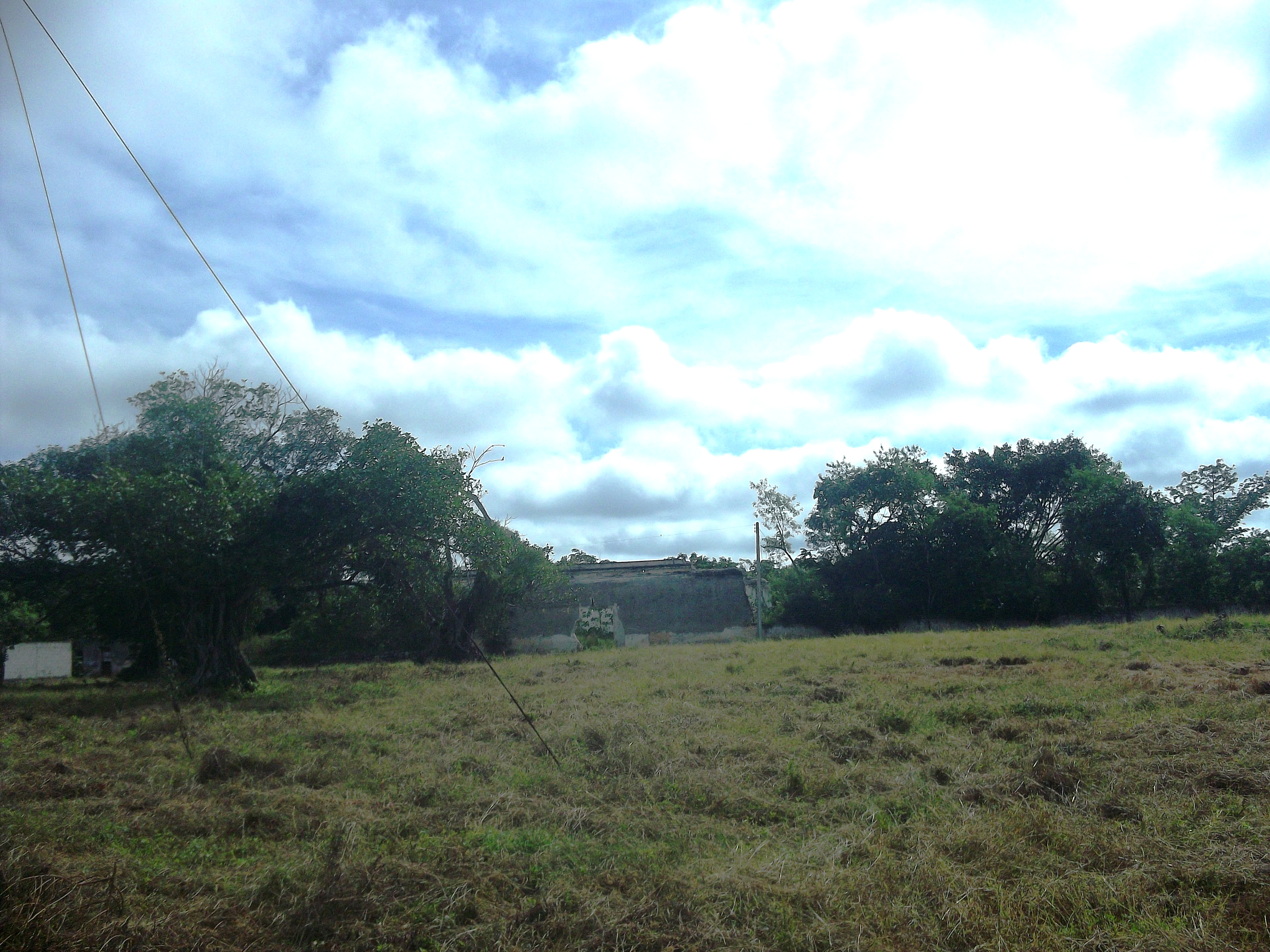
Hacienda

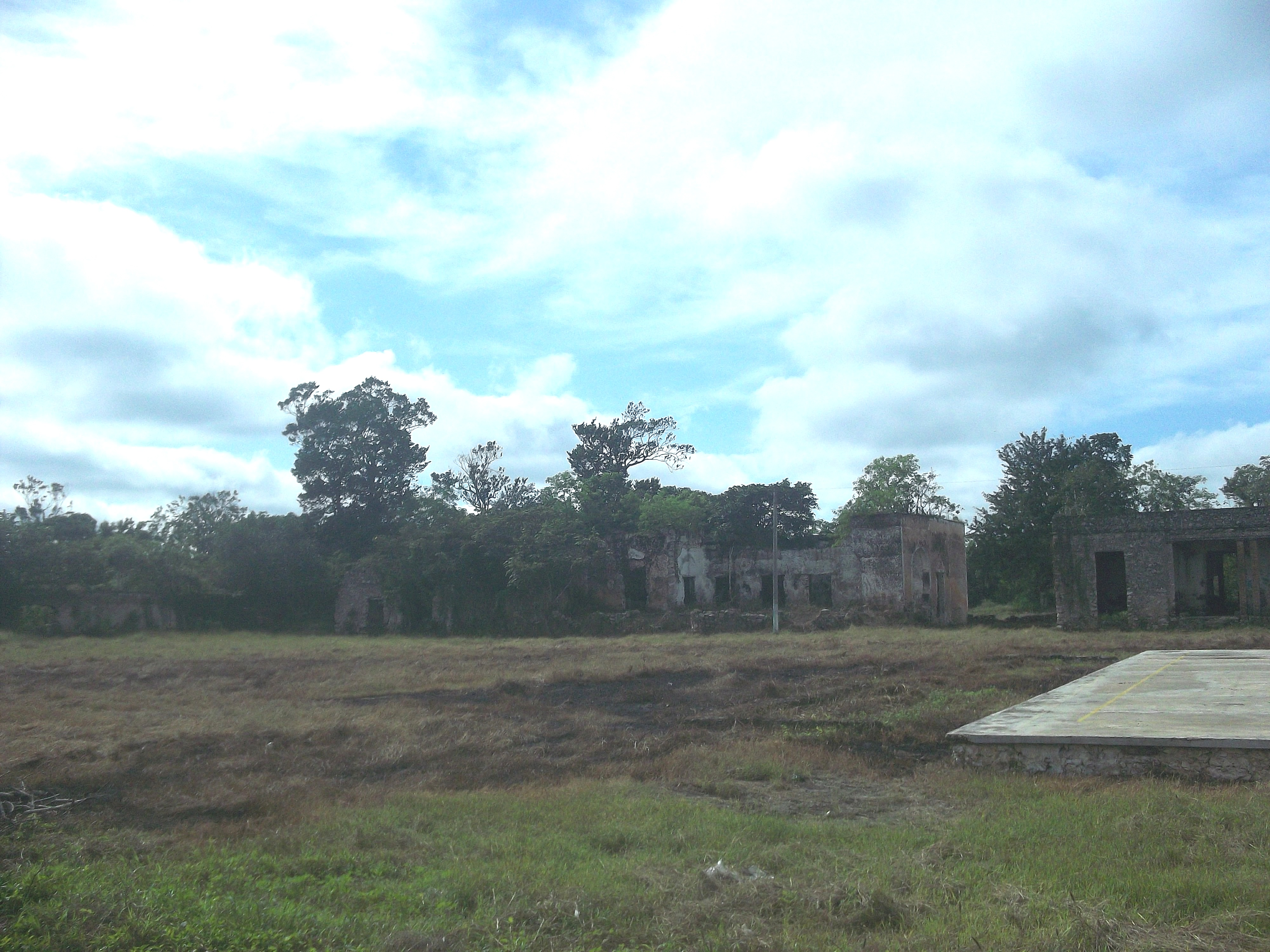
Hacienda

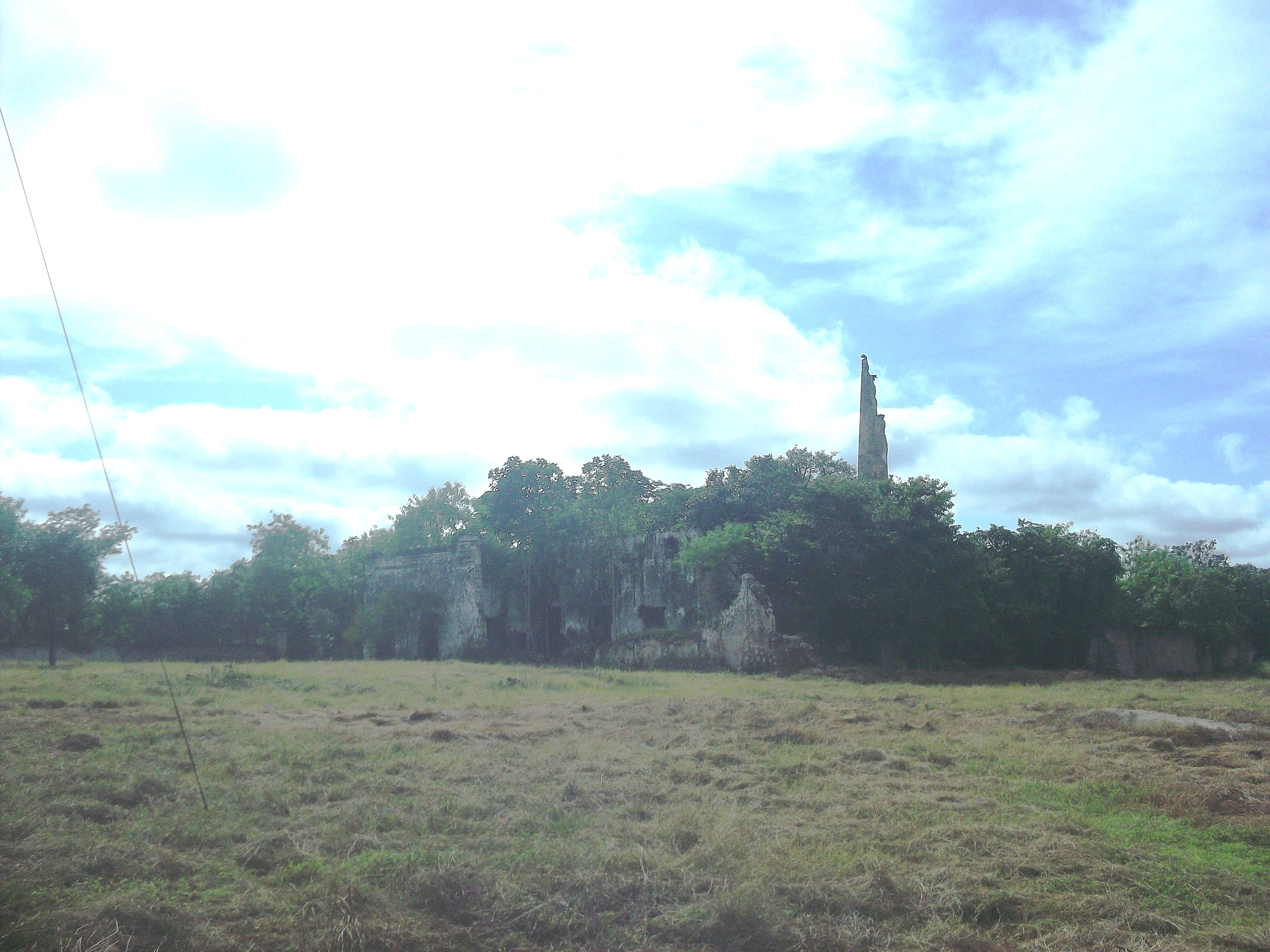
Hacienda

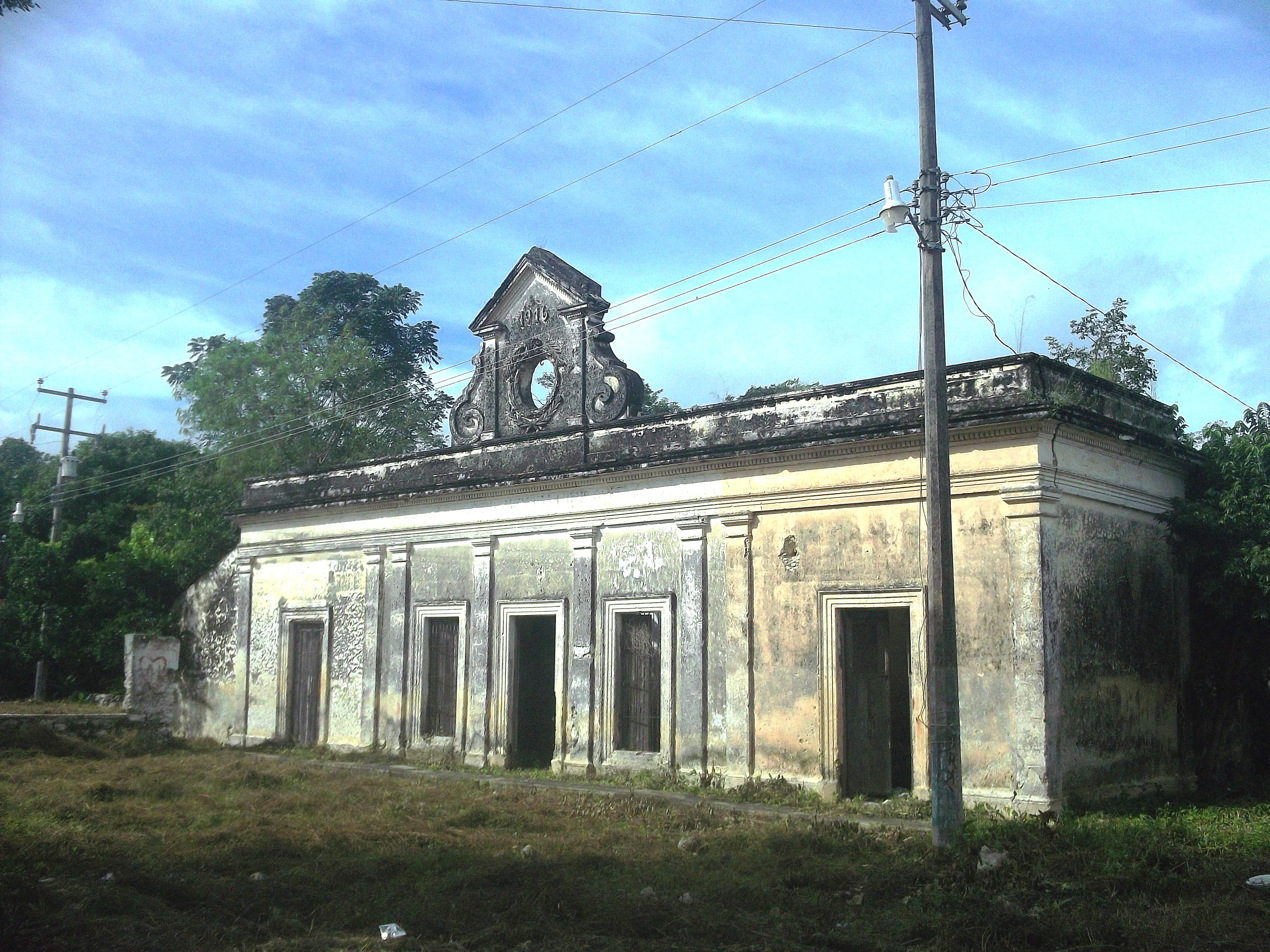
Hacienda

== Bibliography ==
- Bracamonte, P and Solís, R., Los espacios de autonomía maya, Ed. UADY, Mérida, 1997.
- Gobierno del Estado de Yucatán, "Los municipios de Yucatán", 1988.
- Kurjack, Edward y Silvia Garza, Atlas arqueológico del Estado de Yucatán, Ed. INAH, 1980.
- Patch, Robert, La formación de las estancias y haciendas en Yucatán durante la colonia, Ed. UADY, 1976.
- Peón Ancona, J. F., "Las antiguas haciendas de Yucatán", en Diario de Yucatán, Mérida, 1971.
