= Muna Municipality =

Municipality in the Mexican state of Yucatán

Muna
- Municipality
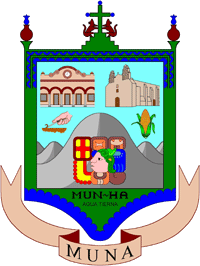
- Coat of arms

- Region 7 Sur #053

- Location of the Municipality in Mexico
- Coordinates: 20°29′05″N 89°42′47″W
- Country: Mexico
- State: Yucatán
- Mexico Ind.: 1821
- Yucatán Est.: 1824

Government
  - Type: 2012–2015
  - Municipal President: Pedro Ricardo Calam Farfan

Area
  - Total: 270.81 km^{2} (104.56 sq mi)
- Elevation: 19 m (62 ft)

Population (2010)
  - Total: 12,336
  - Density: 45.552/km^{2} (117.98/sq mi)
  - Demonym: Umanense
- Time zone: UTC-6 (Central Standard Time)
- INEGI Code: 053
- Major Airport: Merida (Manuel Crescencio Rejón) International Airport
- IATA Code: MID
- ICAO Code: MMMD

Muna Municipality (In the Yucatec Maya Language: "soft water") is a municipality in the Mexican state of Yucatán containing 270.81 km^{2} of land and is located roughly 50 km south of the city of Mérida.

== History ==
There is no accurate data on when the town was founded, though it existed before the conquest, as part of the chieftainship of Tutul Xiu. At colonization, Muna became part of the encomienda system. The areas encompassing Muna and Dzán Municipality were joined for a time during the encomienda system. The first encomendero was Castilla in 1549 and it then passed to Alonso Rosado and Diego Rosado. By 1607 the encomendero was Pedro Rosado. In 1625, the trusteeship passed to Diego de Jáuregui and Francisca Rosado and in 1629 to Sebastián de Mendoza and Diego de Mendoza.

Yucatán declared its independence from the Spanish Crown in 1821, and in 1825 the area was assigned to the low sierra partition of Mama Municipality. In 1867 it was transferred to the Ticul Municipality and confirmed as its own municipality in 1988.

== Governance ==
The municipal president is elected for a three-year term. The town council has nine councilpersons, who serve as Secretary and councilors of education, agricultural development, public lighting, events, roads, cemeteries, maintenance, ecology and parks.

The Municipal Council administers the business of the municipality. It is responsible for budgeting and expenditures and producing all required reports for all branches of the municipal administration. Annually it determines educational standards for schools.

The Police Commissioners ensure public order and safety. They are tasked with enforcing regulations, distributing materials and administering rulings of general compliance issued by the council.

== Communities ==
The head of the municipality is Muna, Yucatán. There are 18 populated areas of the municipality including Choyob, Lazaro Cárdenas, Muna, San José Tipceh and Yaxha. The significant populations are shown below:

Community	Population
Entire Municipality (2010)	12,336
Muna	10957 in 2005
San José Tipceh	488 in 2005
Yaxhá	210 in 2005

== Local festivals ==
Every year from 12 to 15 August the town celebrates a festival in honor of its patroness, the Virgin of the Assumption.

== Tourist attractions ==
- Church of the Virgin of the Assumption, built during the colonial period
- Chapel of St. Bernard, built during the colonial period
- Chapel of San Andres, built during the colonial period
- Chapel of San Mateo, built during the colonial period
- Chapel of San Sebastián, built during the colonial period
- Chapel of Santa María, built during the colonial period
- Chapel of La Soledad, built during the colonial period
- archaeological site at Uxmal (a UNESCO World Heritage Site)
- archaeological site at Xmatuy
- Hacienda San José Tibceh
