= Hacienda Citincabchén =

- Private Property / Tourist destination
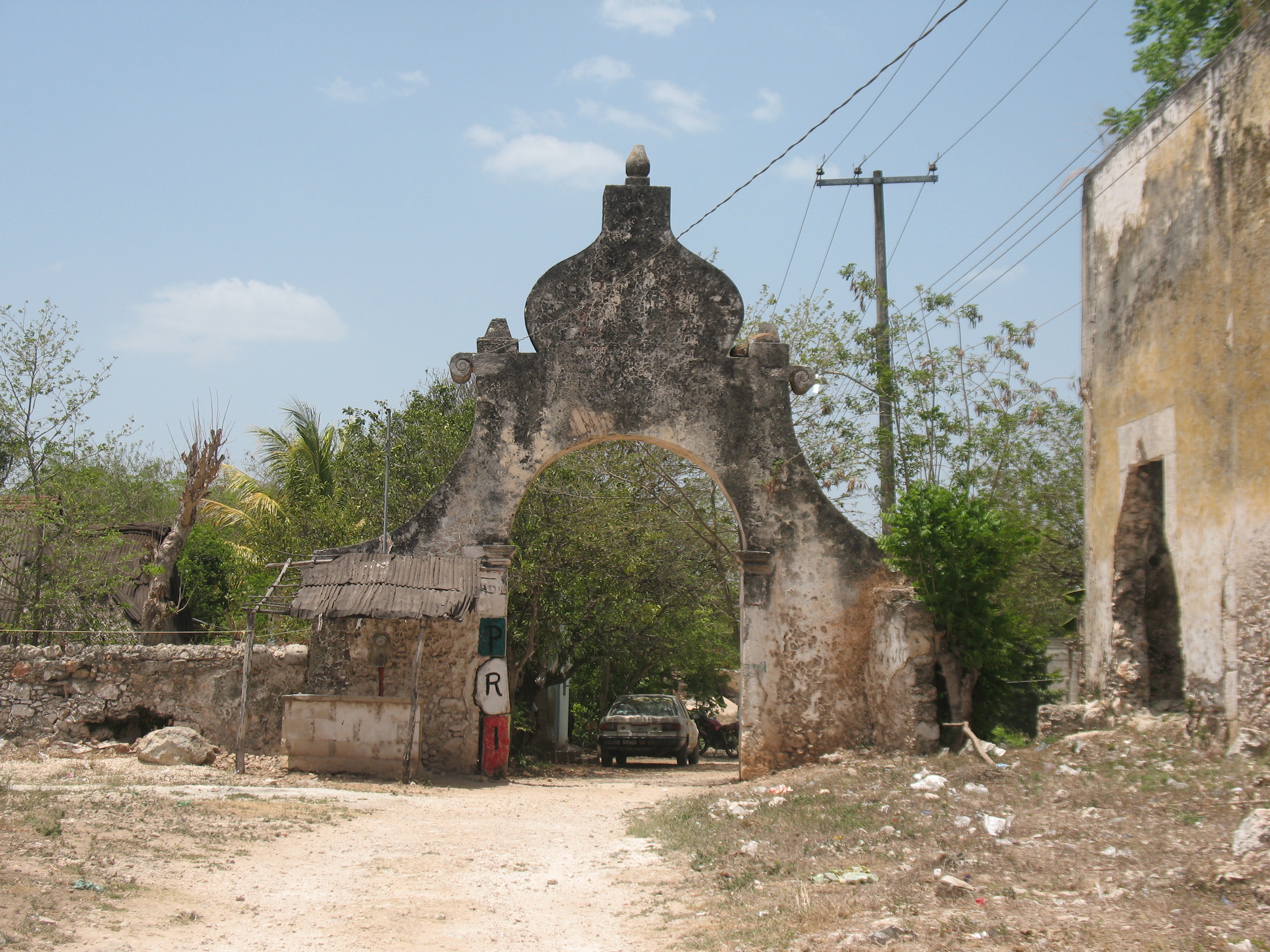
- Entrance Hacienda Citincabchén, Yucatán.

- Location in Mexico
- Coordinates: 20°31′04″N 89°32′06″W
- Country: Mexico
- Mexican States: Yucatán
- Municipalities: Municipality of Chapab
- Time zone: UTC−6 (CST)
  - Summer (DST): UTC−5 (CDT)
- Postal code: 97857
- Area code: 997

Hacienda Citincabchén is located in the Chapab Municipality in the state of Yucatán in southeastern Mexico. It is one of the properties that arose during the nineteenth century henequen boom.

== Toponymy ==
The name (Citincabchén) is a word from the Mayan language meaning "I only like honey". In 1910 the name changed from Citincabchén to Cituncabchén and then in 1921 to Citilcalchén, before changing to Citincabchén in 1930.

== How to get there ==
The puebla, and hacienda are located halfway between Muna and Tekit approximately 68 km south of Mérida, Yucatán.

== History ==
There was a henequen hacienda at the site which was part of a labor dispute heard in the 1916 Tribunals of the Revolution hearings under Governor Salvador Alvarado.

== Demographics ==
According to the 2005 census conducted by the INEGI, the population of the city was 817 inhabitants of whom were 423 men and 394 were women.

Population of Citincabchén by year
Year	1900	1910	1921	1930	1940	1950	1960	1970	1980	1990	1995	2000	2005
Population	383	387	343	386	344	390	459	535	566	732	744	743	817

== Bibliography ==
- Bracamonte, P and Solís, R., Los espacios de autonomía maya, Ed. UADY, Mérida, 1997.
- Gobierno del Estado de Yucatán, "Los municipios de Yucatán", 1988.
- Kurjack, Edward y Silvia Garza, Atlas arqueológico del Estado de Yucatán, Ed. INAH, 1980.
- Patch, Robert, La formación de las estancias y haciendas en Yucatán durante la colonia, Ed. UADY, 1976.
- Peón Ancona, J. F., "Las antiguas haciendas de Yucatán", en Diario de Yucatán, Mérida, 1971.

== Photo gallery ==
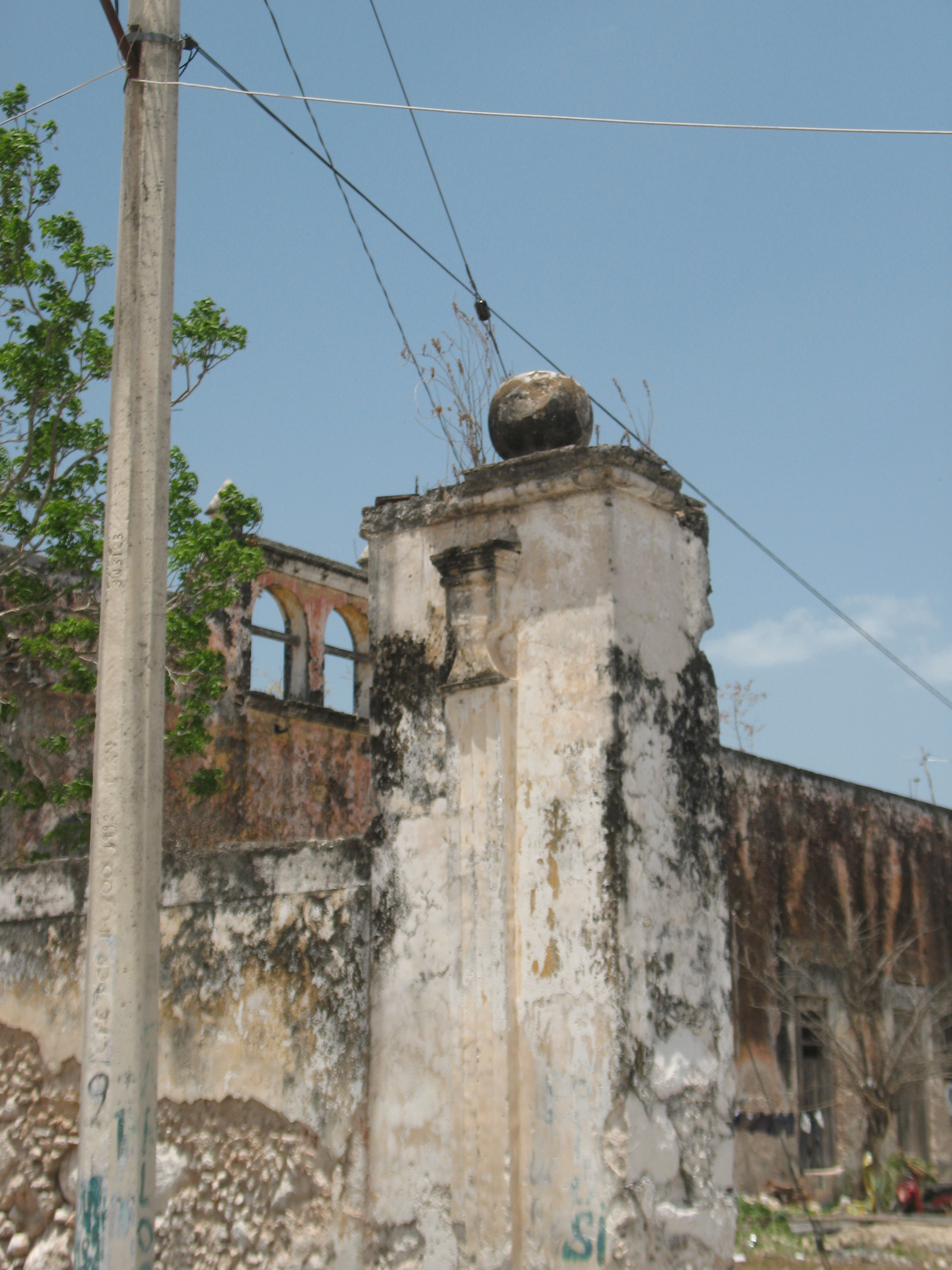
Entry to main house Hacienda Citincabchén, Yucatán

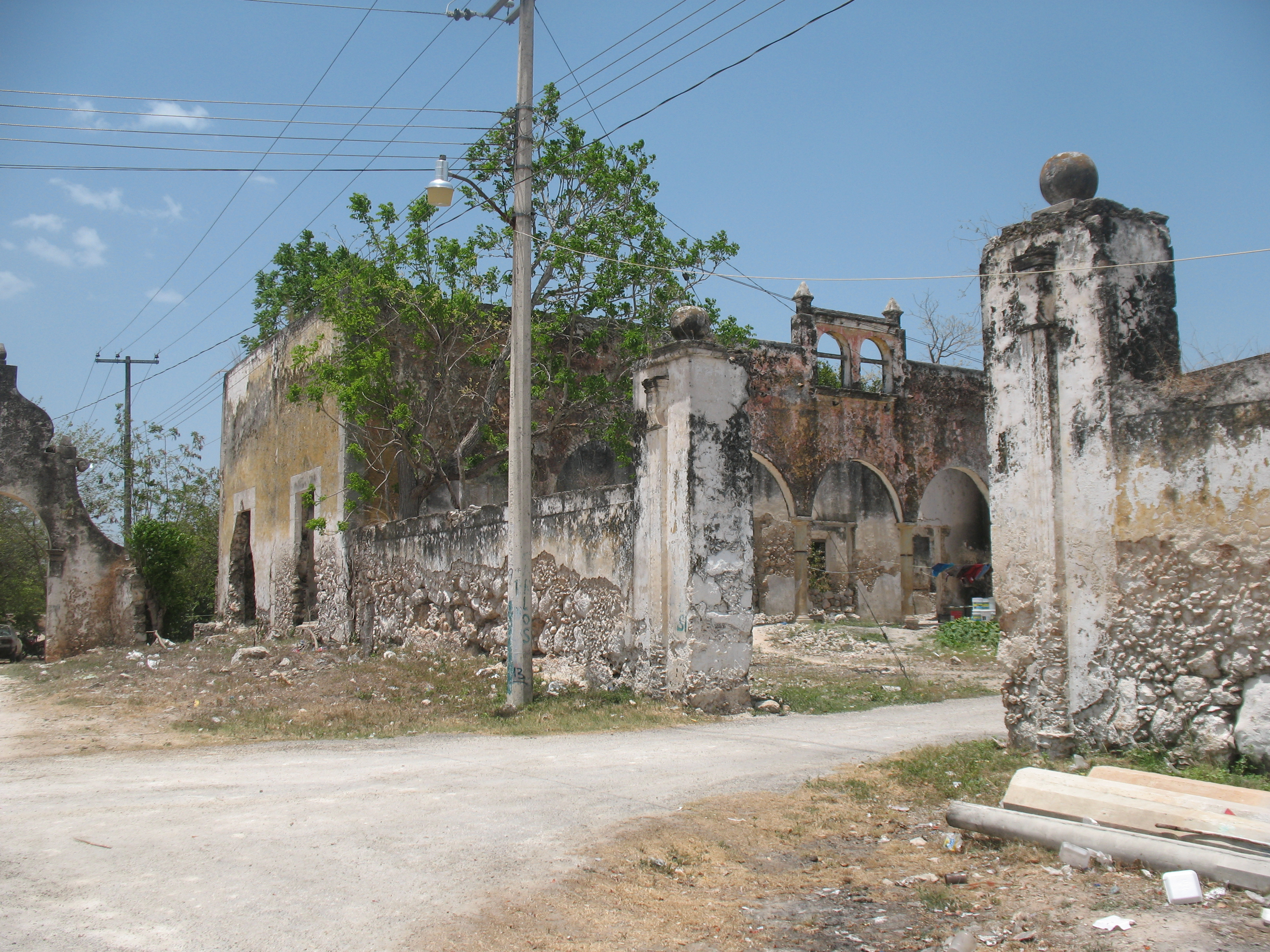
Main House, Hacienda Citincabchén, Yucatán

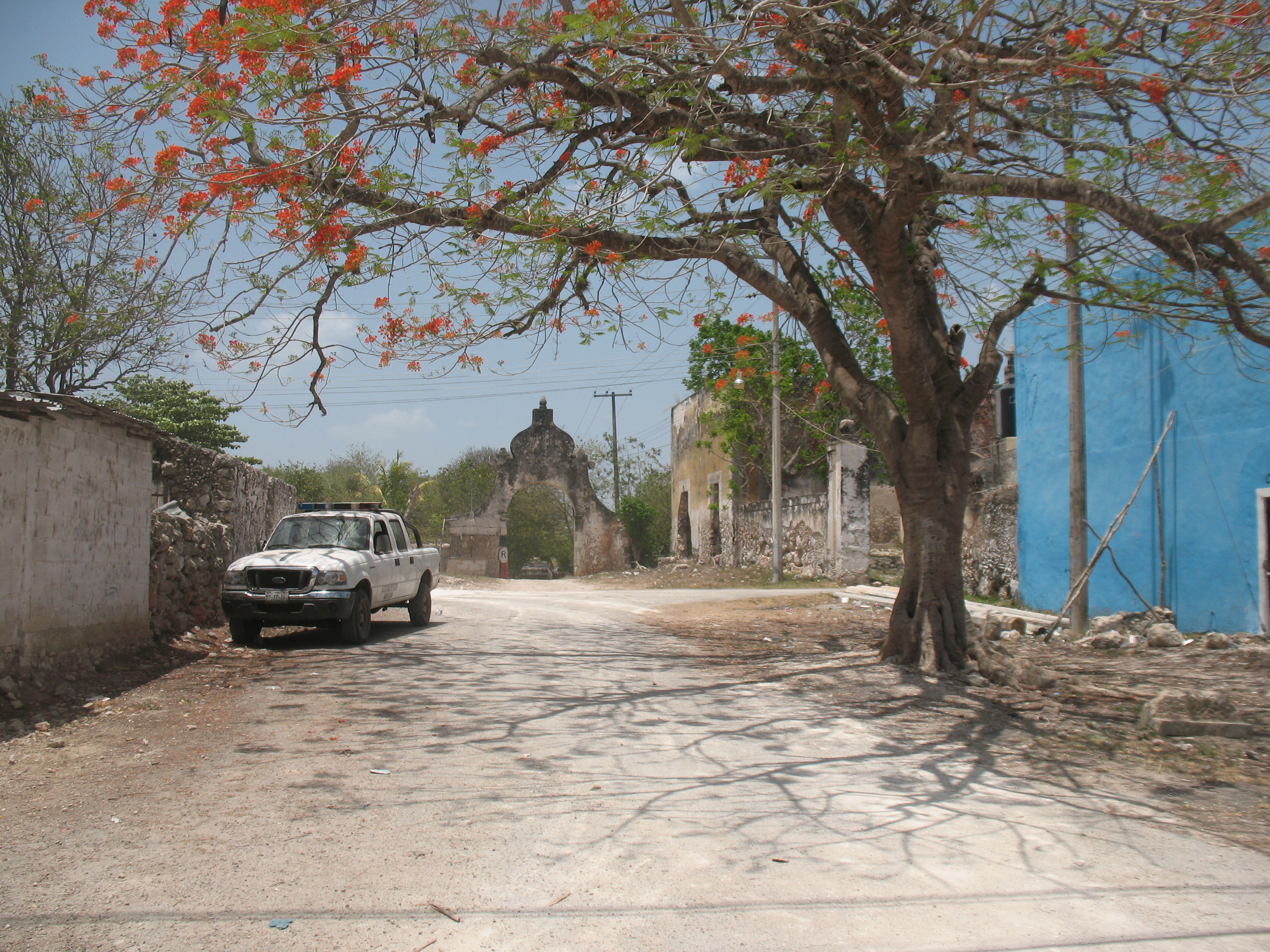
View of Hacienda Citincabchén, Yucatán

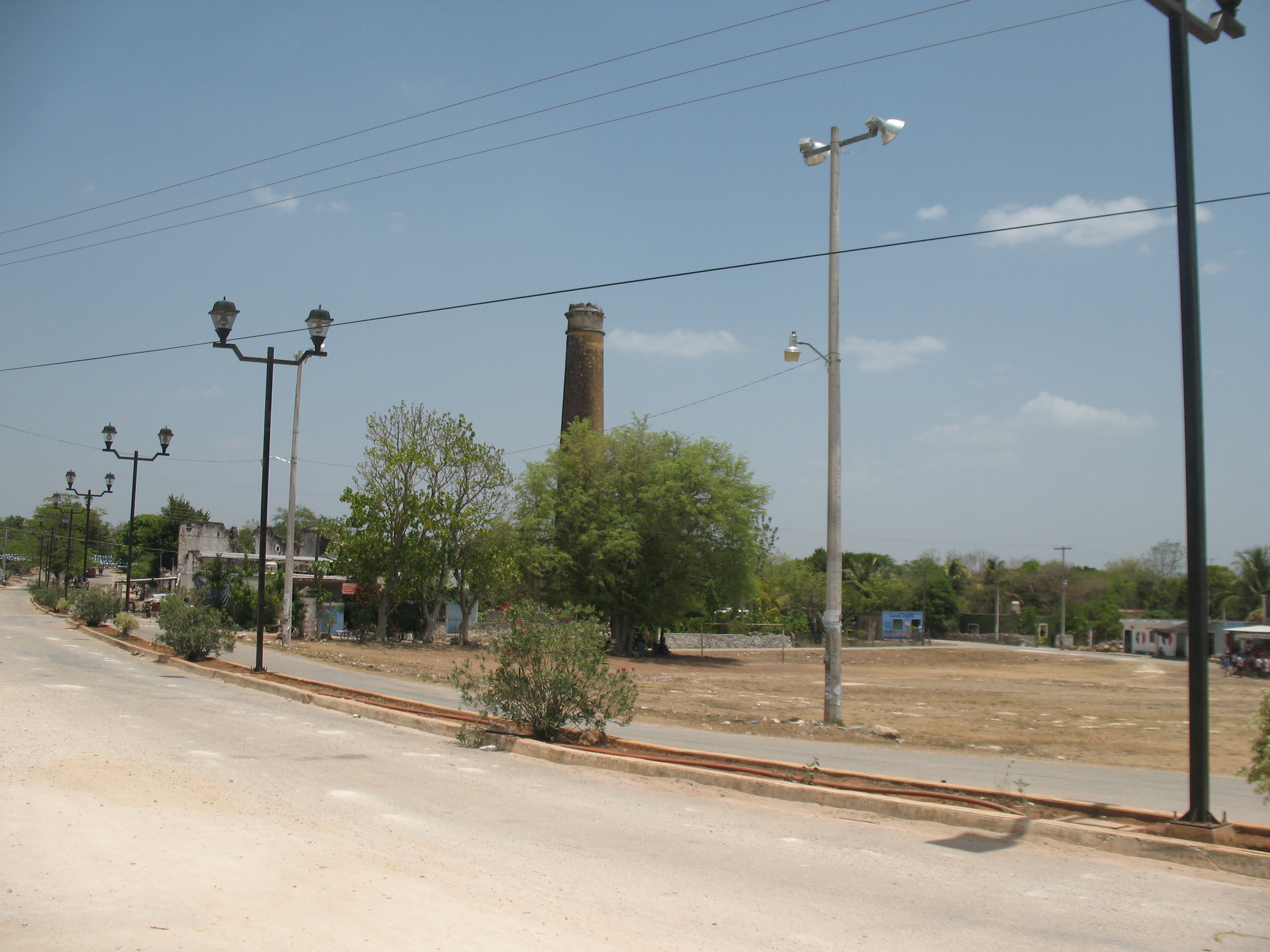
Chimney and henequen factory ruin Hacienda Citincabchén, Yucatán

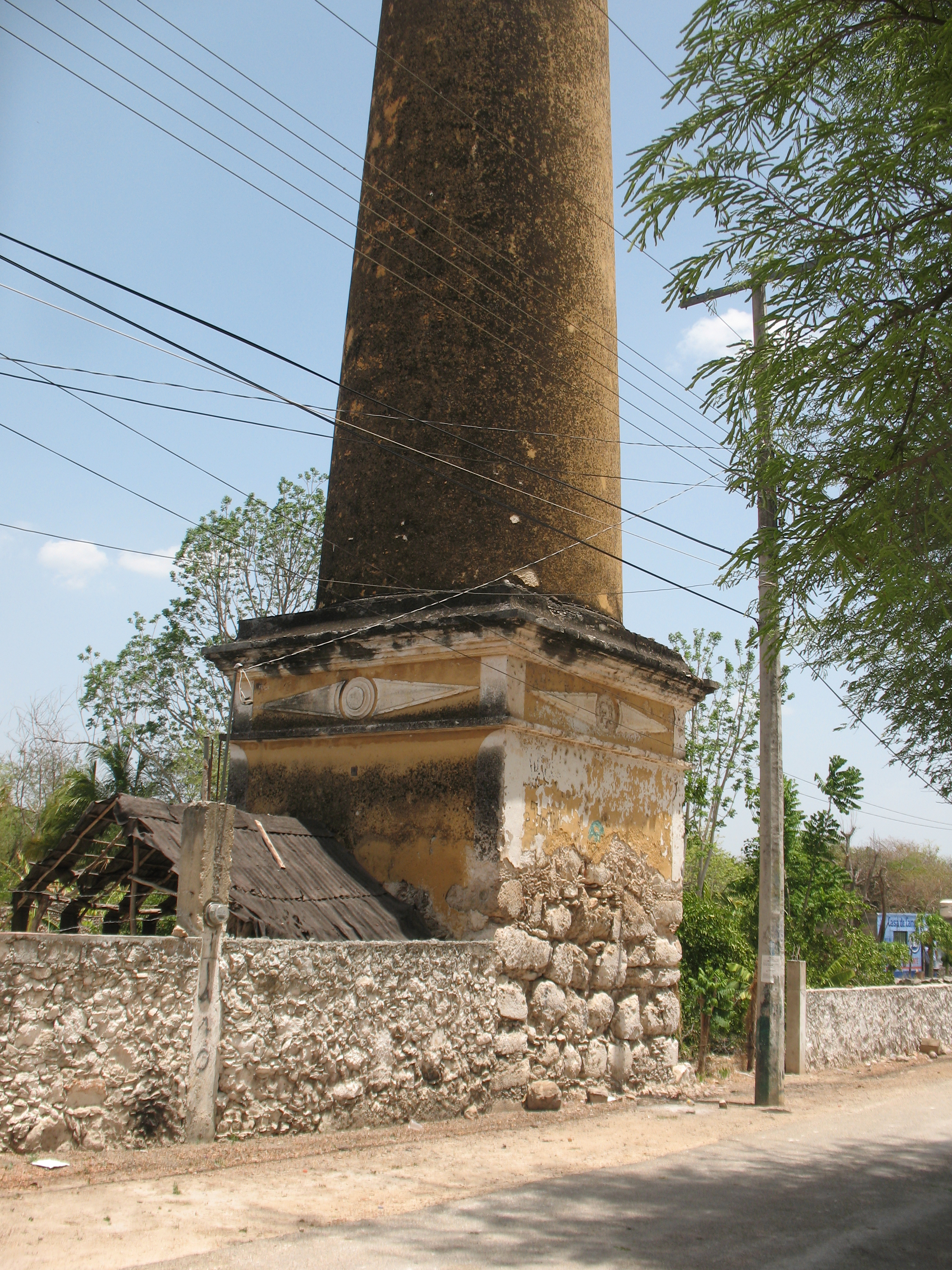
Chimney detail, Hacienda Citincabchén, Yucatán

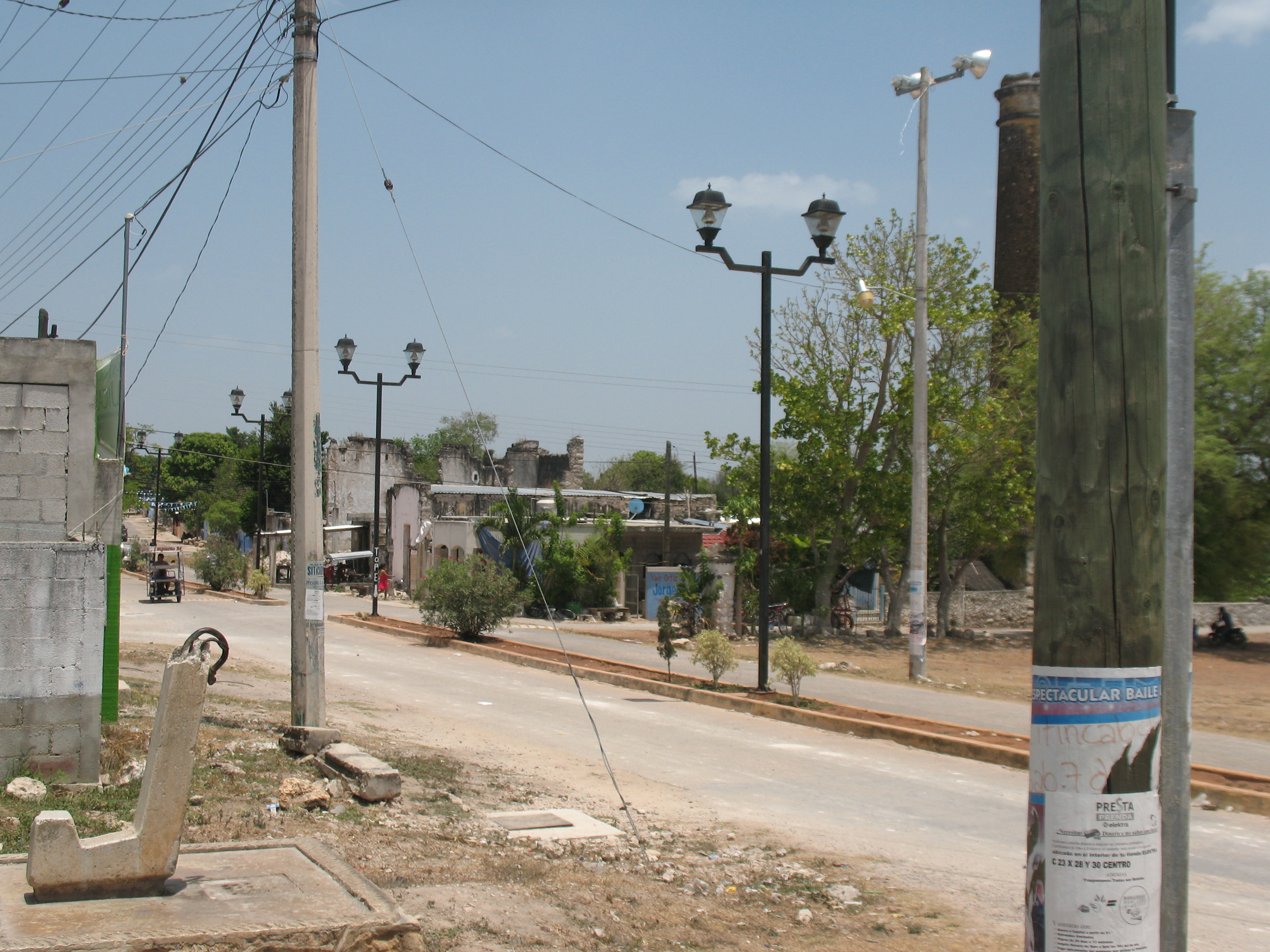
Henequen factory ruin, Hacienda Citincabchén, Yucatán

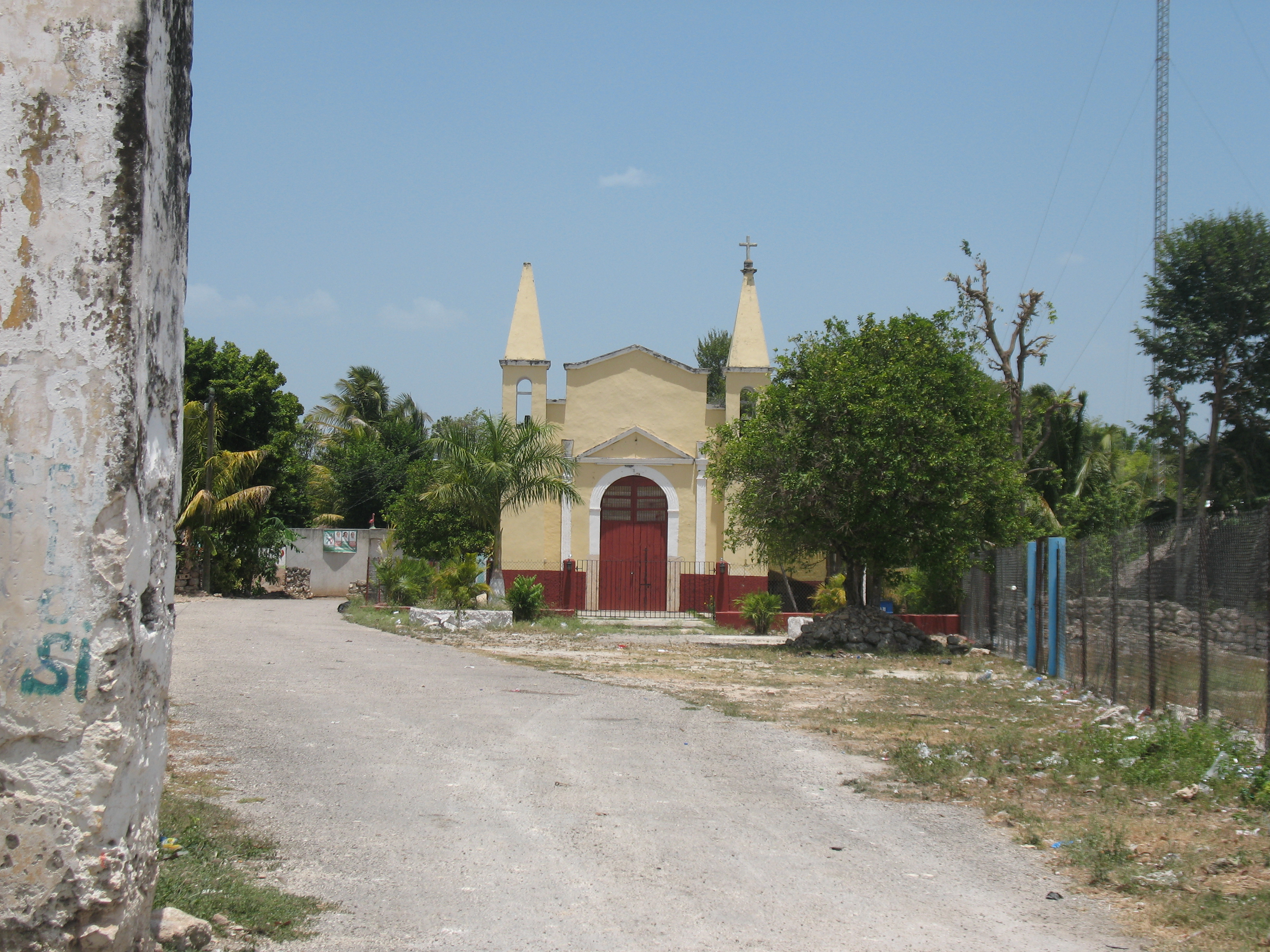
Chapel at Hacienda Citincabchén, Yucatán

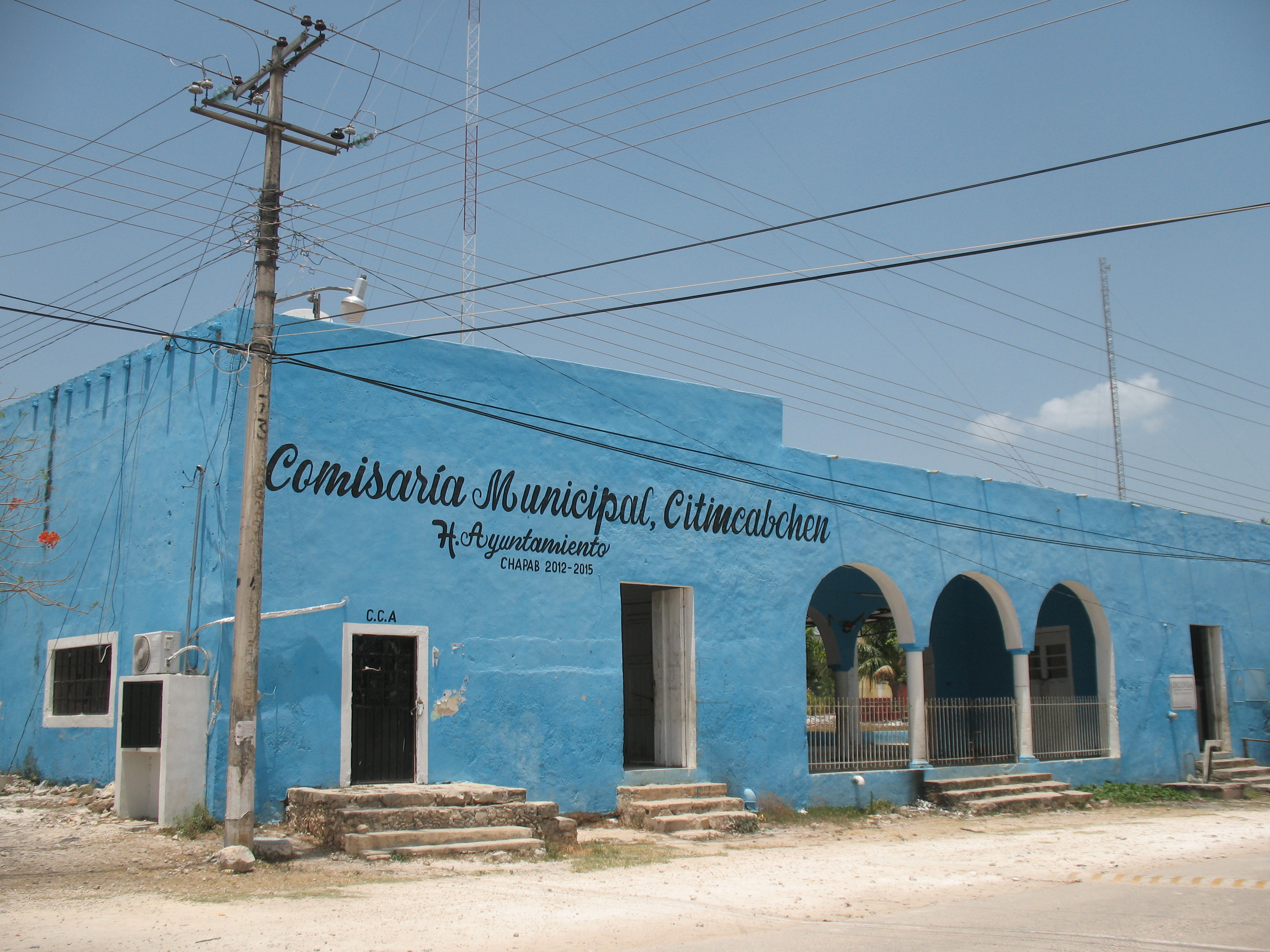
City Hall Citincabchén, Yucatán
