= Chapab Municipality =

Municipality in the Mexican state of Yucatán

- Municipality
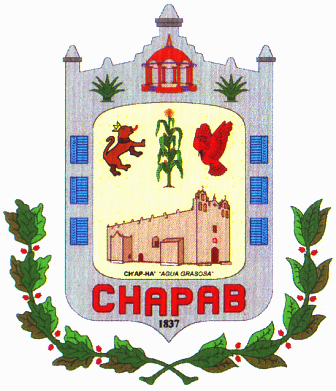
- Coat of arms

- Region 7 Sur #018

- Location of the Municipality in Mexico
- Coordinates: 20°27′30″N 89°27′30″W
- Country: Mexico
- State: Yucatán

Government
  - Type: 2012–2015
  - Municipal President: Pedro Pablo Zapata Pacheco

Area
  - Total: 168.62 km^{2} (65.10 sq mi)
- Elevation: 6 m (20 ft)

Population (2010)
  - Total: 3,035
- Time zone: UTC-6 (Central Standard Time)
- INEGI Code: 009
- Major Airport: Merida (Manuel Crescencio Rejón) International Airport
- IATA Code: MID
- ICAO Code: MMMD

Chapab Municipality (In the Yucatec Maya Language: “Place of oily water”) is a municipality in the Mexican state of Yucatán containing 168.62 km^{2} of land and located roughly 85 km south of the city of Mérida.

== History ==
Its colonial history is unknown prior to the conquest. After colonization, it was part of the encomienda system during the 18th century. In 1837, it was designated as a puebla under Ticul.

== Governance ==
The municipal president is elected for a three-year term. The president appoints Councilpersons to serve on the board for three year terms, as Secretary, and councilors of Public Works; Ecology; and street lighting.

The Municipal Council administers the business of the municipality. It is responsible for budgeting and expenditures and producing all required reports for all branches of the municipal administration. Annually it determines educational standards for schools.

The Police Commissioners ensure public order and safety. They are tasked with enforcing regulations, distributing materials and administering rulings of general compliance issued by the council.

In addition, the municipal agencies ensure the preservation of public order, and apprehend and prosecute criminals as required by authority. They also regulate gaming and the sale of alcohol, and enforce civil registrations and education requirements.

== Communities ==
The municipality is made up of 5 communities:

Community	Population
Entire Municipality (2010)	3,035
Chapab	2057 in 2005
Citincabchén	817 in 2005
Hunabchén	34 in 2005
Rosa Alvarado	9 in 2005
Xaybé	3 in 2005

== Local festivals ==
Every year from the 28 November to 8 December a fiesta is celebrated in honor of the Virgin of the Immaculate Conception.

== Tourist attractions ==
- Cathedral of St. Peter the Apostle
- Hacienda Citincabchén
- Hacienda Ycman
