= Cuxtal Ecological Reserve =

- Ecological Preservation Area
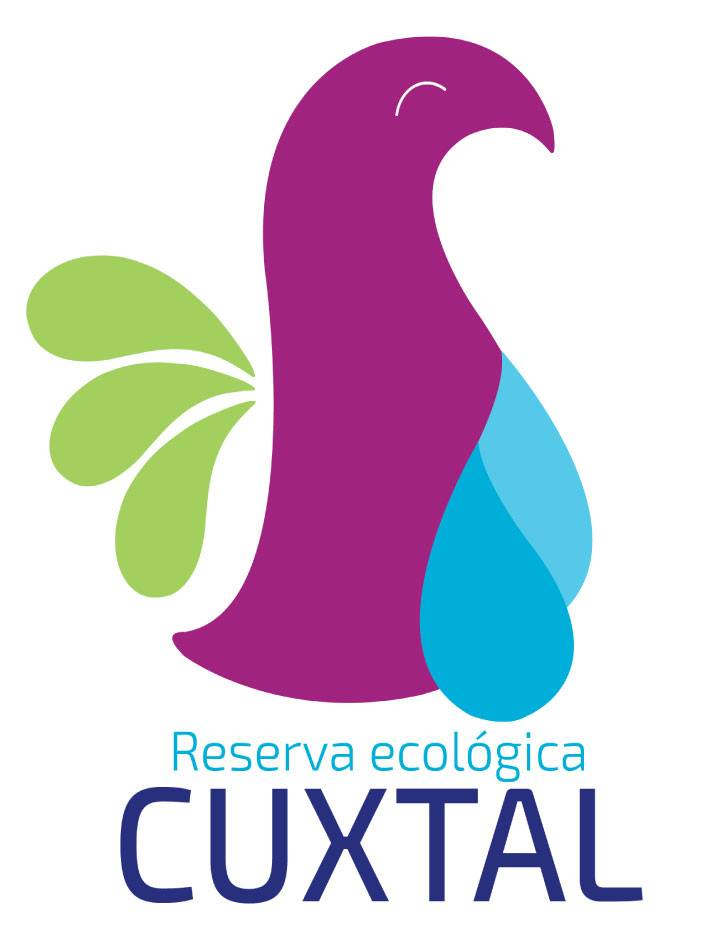
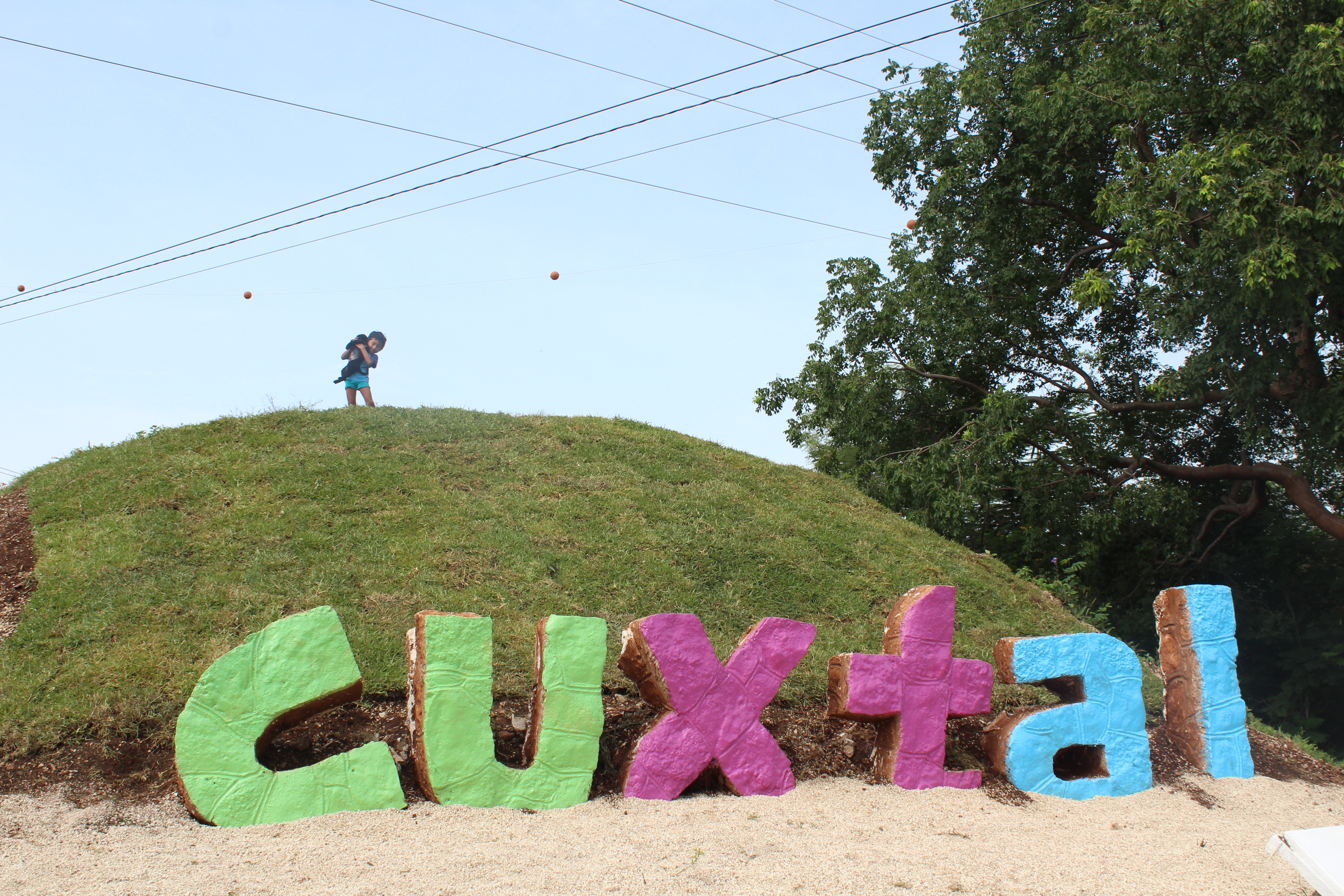
- Entrance Cuxtal Ecological Reserve, Yucatán.

- Location in Mexico
- Coordinates: 20°51′38″N 89°37′27″W
- Country: Mexico
- Mexican States: Yucatán
- Municipalities: Mérida Municipality
- Time zone: UTC−6 (CST)
  - Summer (DST): UTC−5 (CDT)
- Postal code: 97316
- Area code: 999

The Cuxtal Ecological Reserve (Yucatec Maya pronunciation: [kuʃˈtal], from the Mayan language meaning "life") is located in the southern zone of Mérida Municipality, between 20° 47' and 20° 55' of north latitude and 89° 33 and 89° 40' of west longitude. The Reserve limits to the north with the city of Mérida, south with the commissariats of Yaxnic and Texán Cámara, east with the municipality of Kanasín and west with the commissariats of San José Tzal and Ticimul. It provides 50% of the water in the City of Mérida and is home to 168 bird species, most of them migratory, as well as plants, mammals, reptiles, invertebrates and amphibians. It contains 7 historic haciendas, archaeological sites, cenotes as well as a nature preservation and the Biological Sciences campus of the Autonomous University of Yucatán.

== History ==
The Zone Subject to Ecological Conservation Cuxtal Reserve is recognized as the first Protected Natural Area (ANP by its initials in Spanish) promoted and decreed directly by a municipality in the state of Yucatán during the Mérida City Council 1991–1993. Its establishment as ANP was approved by the council on June 28, 1993, and its decree was published in the Official Gazette of the Government of the State of Yucatán on July 14, 1993. In this way the Reserve was constituted as the first ANP of competition municipal government in Yucatán, a situation that prevails today.

In December 2016 the initiative called "Alliance for Cuxtal" was formally set up constituted by government agencies, educational institutions, civil associations and the private sector, to promote actions aimed at the rescue and preservation of the Reserve.

In February 2017, the agreement is published authorizing the creation of the Decentralized Municipal Public Organization for Operation and Administration of the Cuxtal Reserve Ecological Preservation Area. In subsequent months, its Governing Board, the advisory board and the Operational Directorate are set up, which will favor the operation, management and administration of the Reserve.

== Localization and limits ==
It has an area of 10,757 hectares. The Reserve limits to the north with the city of Mérida, to the south with the commissariats of Yaxnic and Texán Cámara, to the east with the municipality of Kanasín and to the west with the commissariats of San José Tzal and Ticimul. Within its territory are two commissariats: Dzununcán and Molas, seven sub-commisariats: Santa Cruz Palomeque, Tahdzibichén, Xmatkuil, San Pedro Chimay, San Ignacio Tesip, Hunxectamán, Dzoyaxché and a conurban area with 10 colonies of the city of Mérida belonging to the Dzununcán commisariat, Xmatkuil sub-commissariat and parts of San Antonio Xluch and Kanasín.

== Zoning ==
Zoning is the tool that defines the zones or subzones of the Reserve according to criteria that allow the identification of territorial geographical units where specific use rules are applied according to protection requirements, which makes the conservation process more effective, without diminishing the potential management and sustainable use of their natural resources.

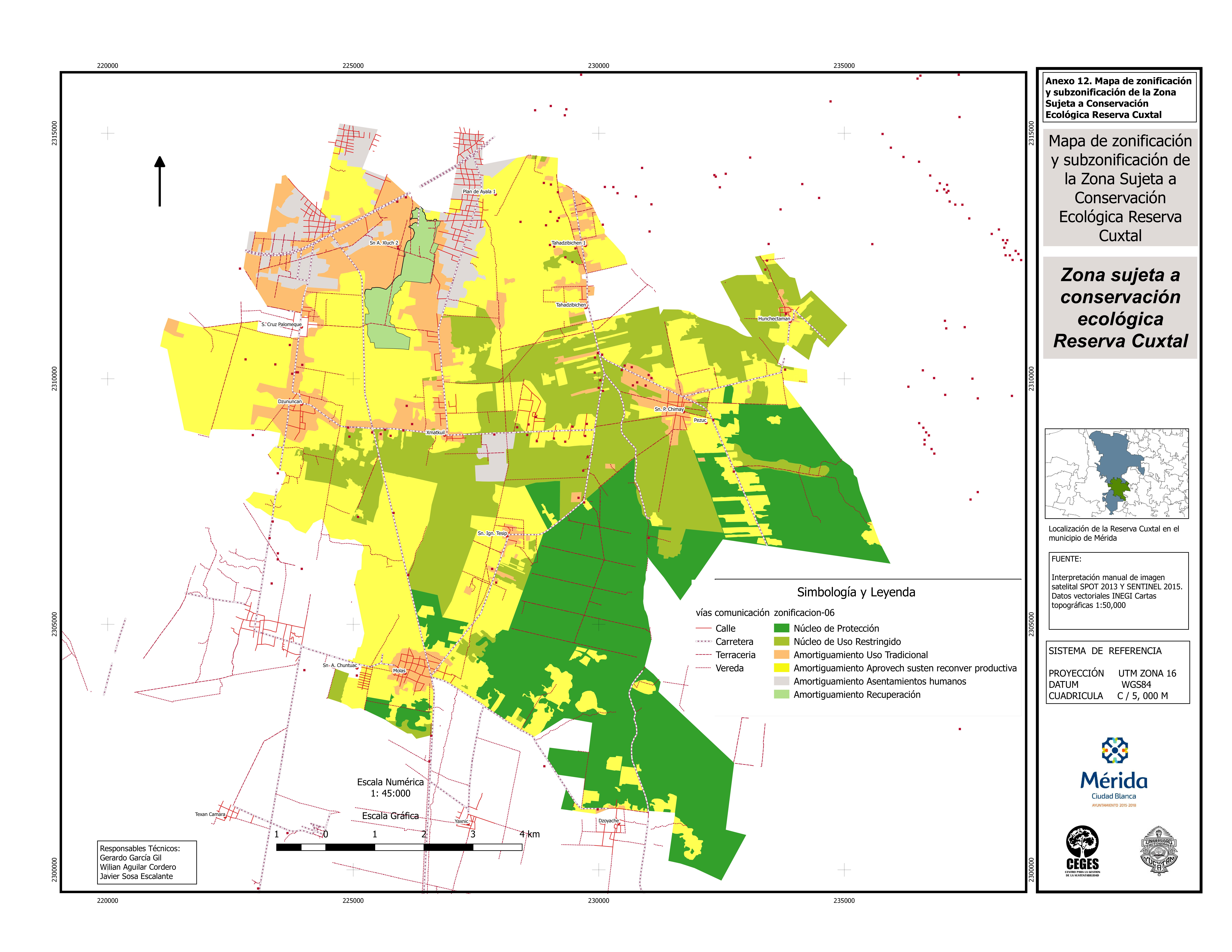

Zone Classification
| Restricted use area |
| Human settlements area |
| Recovery zone |
| Area of sustainable use with productive reconversion |
| Core zone of protection |
| Traditional use area |

=== Core zone ===
It is formed by the best-preserved surfaces and which have arboreal vegetation whose geographical location favors long-term conservation. It has an area of 4,928.52 hectares and its main objective is the preservation of ecosystems and their functionality in the medium and long term, so only current conditions. It is the main area to conserve the water that supplies the entire municipality of Mérida and its inhabitants.

The Mérida I water treatment plant is located in the core area of the Reserve, where the best-preserved area of forest vegetation is located, which in turn represents the main area for extracting groundwater for the purpose of supplying the entire municipality of Mérida, with a volume of 42.3 mm3 per year that is equal to 48% of the total extraction.

=== Sub-zone of protection ===
It is formed by surfaces that have undergone little alteration and represent critical habitats for biodiversity, so they require special care to ensure their long-term conservation. It has an area of 2,716.38 hectares and its objective is the conservation of less disturbed and more representative areas of the low deciduous forest ecosystem. This sub-zone is represented by the forest vegetation of the Mérida I water treatment plant and partially by the ejidos of Molas and San Pedro Chimay.

Only non-invasive technical and scientific research studies are allowed, which do not involve the extraction or transfer of wildlife specimens, or habitat modification.

=== Sub-zone of restricted use ===
It is formed by the surfaces in good state of conservation where it is sought to maintain the current conditions of the ecosystems and even improve them in the places that are required, through agroecological options. It has an area of 2,212.14 hectares and its objective is to promote connectivity and the preservation of germplasm.

Only non-invasive technical studies and scientific research, environmental education activities and tourism of low environmental impact and ecological enrichment, that do not imply modifications of the original characteristics or natural conditions, and the construction of support facilities, are exclusively allowed. for scientific research or environmental monitoring. The exploitation activities carried out here must be subject to strict control measures.

=== Buffer zone ===
It is formed by the surfaces where there is a greater use of the territory. It has an area of 5,828.48 hectares and its objective is to guide the exploitation activities that are carried out (milpa, henequen, crops, stone extraction, human settlements, urbanization, agricultural production systems, livestock and forestry), to lead towards the development sustainable, apply the current federal, state and municipal regulations, so that the necessary conditions are created for the reconversion and ecological restoration that allows the conservation of the area in the long term. Vegetation and Flora

The vegetation in the Reserve is low deciduous forest (SBC). SBCs are plant communities that are distributed in hot climates, the driest of the subhumid. These are ecosystems that mark a thermal and hydric limit between the types of vegetation that are distributed in the hot humid climate zones. The arboreal components in this forest reach a maximum height of up to 15 meters and a percentage higher than 75 of the species throw their leaves in the dry season of the year. In the Reserve, SBC occurs on secondary vegetation surfaces in different conservation or succession states.

It includes 474 species included in 96 families. The families with the greatest number of species are Fabaceae (58), Euphorbiaceae (30) and Asteraceae (24), which represent 23.5% of the total number of plants registered in the Reserve. In contrast, 33.33% of the families (Adoxaceae, Apiaceae, Araucariaceae, Asphodelaceae, Begoniaceae, Burseraceae, Cannabaceae, Cannaceae, Casuarinaceae, Combretaceae, Cycadaceae, Cyclanthaceae, Dryopteridaceae, Iridaceae, Lauraceae, Loasaceae, Loranthaceae, Menispermaceae, Moringaceae, Muntingiaceae, Oxalidaceae, Papaveraceae, Piperaceae, Plantaginaceae, Ranunculaceae, Scrophulariaceae, Ulmaceae, Violaceae, Vitaceae, Zamiaceae and Zygophyllaceae) are monospecific. Nine species (1.9%) are classified as at risk in the Official Mexican Standard NOM-059-SEMARNAT-2010, Environmental protection-Species native to Mexico of wild flora and fauna-Risk categories and specifications for inclusion, exclusion or change-List of species at risk. Two are subject to special protection (Roystonea regia and Cedrela odorata), six threatened (Astronium graveolens, Coccothrinax readii, Pseudophoenix sargentii, Thrinax radiata, Zinnia violacea and Beaucarnea pliabilis) and one endangered (Pterocereus gaumeri). Three species are considered endemic to Mexico (C. readii, P. gaumeri and B. pliabilis). Invertebrates The systematic list of invertebrates of the Reserve includes 472 species comprised in 192 genera, 30 families and 15 orders. Of the 472 taxa, 330 have been determined up to gender. The order with the greatest number of species is represented by the Hymenoptera with (356), followed by the order Araneae (74) which together represent 91% of the total of invertebrates registered in the Reserve, with the Braconids and Araneidae being the most representative with 284 and 37 species, respectively. In contrast, the orders Scorpiones, Amblypygi, Prostigmata, Ixodida and Psocodea are only represented by Diplocentrus sp, Paraphrynus sp, Tetranychus urticae, Rhipicephalus sanguineus and Pediculus humanus, respectively.

=== Amphibians ===
The amphibians of the Reserve are represented by 13 species comprised in 12 genera, 8 families and 2 orders (Annex 4). The order with the greatest number of species is Anura (12 species), with tree frogs being the most representative with 4 species. In counterpart, the Urodela order is represented only by Bolitoglossa yucatana. The genus Leptodactylus has two representatives and more than 85% (11) are monotypic species. Four species are cataloged at risk by NOM-059-SEMARNAT-2010 (Bolitoglossa yucatana, Rhinophrynus dorsalis, Triprion petasatus and Rana brownorum) all with the special protection category. Bolitoglossa yucatana and Triprion petasatus are endemic species. Globally, all species of amphibians with distribution in the Reserve are listed by the International Union for the Conservation of Nature (IUCN) as of minor concern.

=== Reptiles ===
The systematic list of reptiles includes 61 species in 49 genera, 20 families and 2 orders (Annex 5). The order with the greatest number of species is Squamata (57), which represents 93% of the total number of reptiles registered in the Reserve, with the colubrids being the most representative with 19 species. In counterpart, the order Testudines is represented by Kinosternon scorpioides, Rhinoclemmys areolata, Terrapene yucatana and Trachemys venusta. Nine genera have two or more representatives and more than 65% (40) are monotypic species. Considering the NOM-059-SEMARNAT-2010, 25 species are cataloged in risk included in 17 subject to special protection (for example K. scorpioides, Pseudelaphe phaescens, Imantodes gemmistratus, Crotalus tzabcan = C. durissus, among others), 7 threatened ( for example Coleonyx elegans, Ctenosaura similis, Boa imperator = B. constrictor imperator, among others) and 1 endangered (Ctenosaura defender). Ctenosaura similis and C. defender are considered species and priority populations for conservation (Official Gazette of the Federation, 2014). A species with distribution in the Reserve (Micrurus diastema) is endemic to Mexico and 23 species (37%) are endemic to the Yucatán Peninsula (for example T. yucatana, C. defender, Sceloporus chrysostictus, Coniophanes meridanus, among others). Globally, 69% of the reptiles with distribution in the Reserve are classified by the IUCN as of minor concern, R. areolata is considered almost threatened; T. yucatana and C. defender as vulnerable. Terrapene yucatana and B. imperator are included in Appendix II of the Convention on International Trade in Endangered Species of Wild Fauna and Flora (CITES).

=== Birds ===
The Reserve's systematic list of birds includes 161 species comprised in 117 genera, 39 families and 19 orders. The orders with the highest number of species are the Passeriformes (93), Accipitriformes (9), Apodiformes (7) and Columbiformes (7) that represent 72% of the total number of birds registered in the Reserve, being the parulids and accipitridae, the most representative with 17 and 9 species, respectively. On the other hand, the orders Anseriformes, Nyctibiiformes and Tinamiformes are only represented by Crypturellus cinnamomeus, Dendrocygna autumnalis and Nyctibius jamaicensis, respectively. Twenty-six genera have two or more representatives and 91 (56%) are monotypic species. In the Reserve, 13 species cataloged at risk are distributed by NOM-059-SEMARNAT-2010. Of these, 11 are subject to special protection (for example Buteogallus anthracinus, Eupsittula nana, Vireo pallens, Passerina ciris, among others) and 2 threatened (Meleagris ocellata and Geranospiza caerulescens). Meleagris ocellata, Zenaida asiatica, E. nana, Amazona albifrons and Amazona xantholora are considered within the list of species and priority populations for conservation. Nine species are considered endemic to Mexico (e.g. Colinus nigrogularis, Nyctiphrynus yucatanicus, Melanerpes pygmaeus, Amazona xantholora, among others). Falco peregrinus is included in Appendix I of CITES. Globally, 96% of the birds with distribution in the Reserve are classified by the IUCN as minor concern and four almost threatened (M. ocellata, E. nana, Melanoptila glabirostris and P. ciris). 71% of the birds (114 species) present in the Reserve are residents of the region, highlighting the order of the passerines with 57 species. Thirty-three species are migratory, of which only one is summer migratory (Vireo flavoviridis). Two species have occasional presence (Buteo swainsoni and Zonotrichia leucophrys) and 12 are considered bystanders (for example Coccyzus americanus, Chordeiles minor, Contopus virens, Progne subis, among others).

=== Mammals ===
The systematic list of mammals in the Reserve includes 56 species comprised in 50 genera, 20 subfamilies, 26 families and 9 orders. The orders with the highest number of species are Chiroptera (23), Rodentia (15) and Carnivora (10), which represent 86% of the total number of mammals registered in the Reserve, with phyllostomid bats and cricetid rodents being the most representative 10 and 8 species, respectively. In contrast, the orders Cingulata, Pilosa, Soricomorpha, Lagomorpha are only represented by Dasypus novemcinctus, Tamandua mexicana, Cryptotis mayensis and Sylvilagus floridanus, respectively. Six genera have two representatives and 44 species (78%) are monotypic. In the Reserve, 6 species and subspecies cataloged at risk are distributed by NOM-059-SEMARNAT-2010. Of these, 2 are subject to special protection (Cryptotis mayensis and Eumops nanus), 3 are threatened (Mimon cozumelae, Herpailurus yagouaroundi and Galictis vittata) and 1 are in danger of extinction (Tamandua mexicana mexicana). Odocoileus virginianus is considered within the list of species and priority populations for conservation. Peromyscus leucopus is distributed to North America, 24 to South America (for example Didelphis marsupialis, Natalus mexicanus, Conepatus semistriatus, Cuniculus paca, among others), 17 from North to South America (for example Mormoops megalophylla, Diphylla ecaudata, Urocyon cinereoargenteus, Mustela frenata, others), 6 are endemic to Mesoamerica (C. mayensis, Sciurus yucatanensis, Orthogeomys hispidus, Heteromys gaumeri, Ototylomys phyllotis and Reithrodontomys gracilis) and 4 are endemic to Mexico (Rhogeessa aeneus, Molossus alvarezi, Handleyomys melanotis and Peromyscus yucatanicus). Herpailurus yagouaroundi with distribution in the Reserve is included in Appendix I of CITES. At a global level, all species with distribution in the Reserve are classified by the IUCN as of minor concern.

== Cultural heritage ==
The historical cultural heritage of the Reserve is composed of eleven areas of heritage of which two are commissariat without haciendas, seven are haciendas that gave rise to commissariat and subcommittees and two are private haciendas. The two commissariat are: Molas and Dzununcan; the haciendas with settlements are Hunxectamán are: San Ignacio Tesip, San Pedro Chimay, San Antonio Tahdzibichén, Santa Cruz Palomeque, Xmatkuil and San Nicolás de Dzoyaxché; and the haciendas are San Antonio Chuntuac and San Antonio Xluch.

There are 7 police substations and 2 stations within the reserve, which is made up of 9 communities:

| Community | Population |
|---|---|
| Dzoyaxché | 454 in 2016 |
| Dzununcán | 1,868 in 2016 |
| Hunxectamán | 156 in 2016 |
| Molas | 2,014 in 2016 |
| San Ignacio Tesip | 359 in 2016 |
| San Pedro Chimay | 1,241 in 2016 |
| Santa Cruz Palomeque | 835 in 2016 |
| Tahdzibichén | 748 in 2016 |
| Xmatkuil | 557 in 2016 |

Population
| Infant of 0 to 11 years old | 7,865 (34.43%) |
| Adolescents from 12 to 17 years old | 2,124 (9.29%) |
| Adults 18 to 29 years old | 4,248 (18.59%) |
| Adults from 30 to 59 years old | 7,462 (32.67%) |
| Adults over 60 and over | 1,145 (5.02%) |
| Total | 22,844 |

Population with disability: 590 approx.

Mayan population in the Reserve: 2,689 (approx. 3.6% of the Mérida population)

Within the communities are the protected haciendas:

- Hacienda Hunxectamán in the village of Uxec Taman
- Hacienda San Antonio Tahdzibichén
- Hacienda San Ignacio Tesip in the village of San Ignacio Tesip
- Hacienda San Nicolás Dzoyaxché, that has the Dzonot-Ich cenote in its territories
- Hacienda San Pedro Chimay
- Hacienda Santa Cruz Palomeque
- Hacienda Xmatkuil

== Photo gallery ==
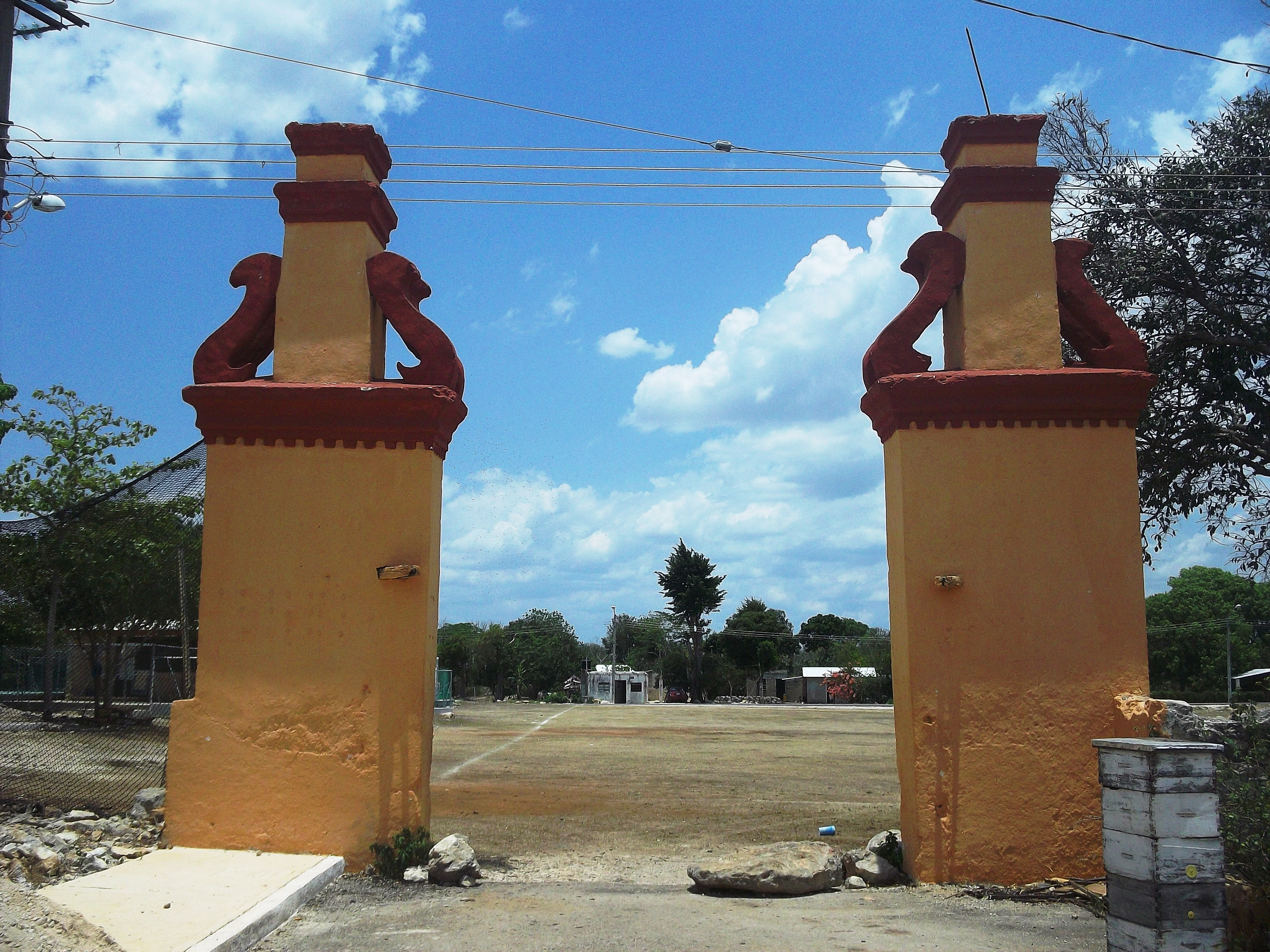
Hunxectamán (Mérida), Yucatán

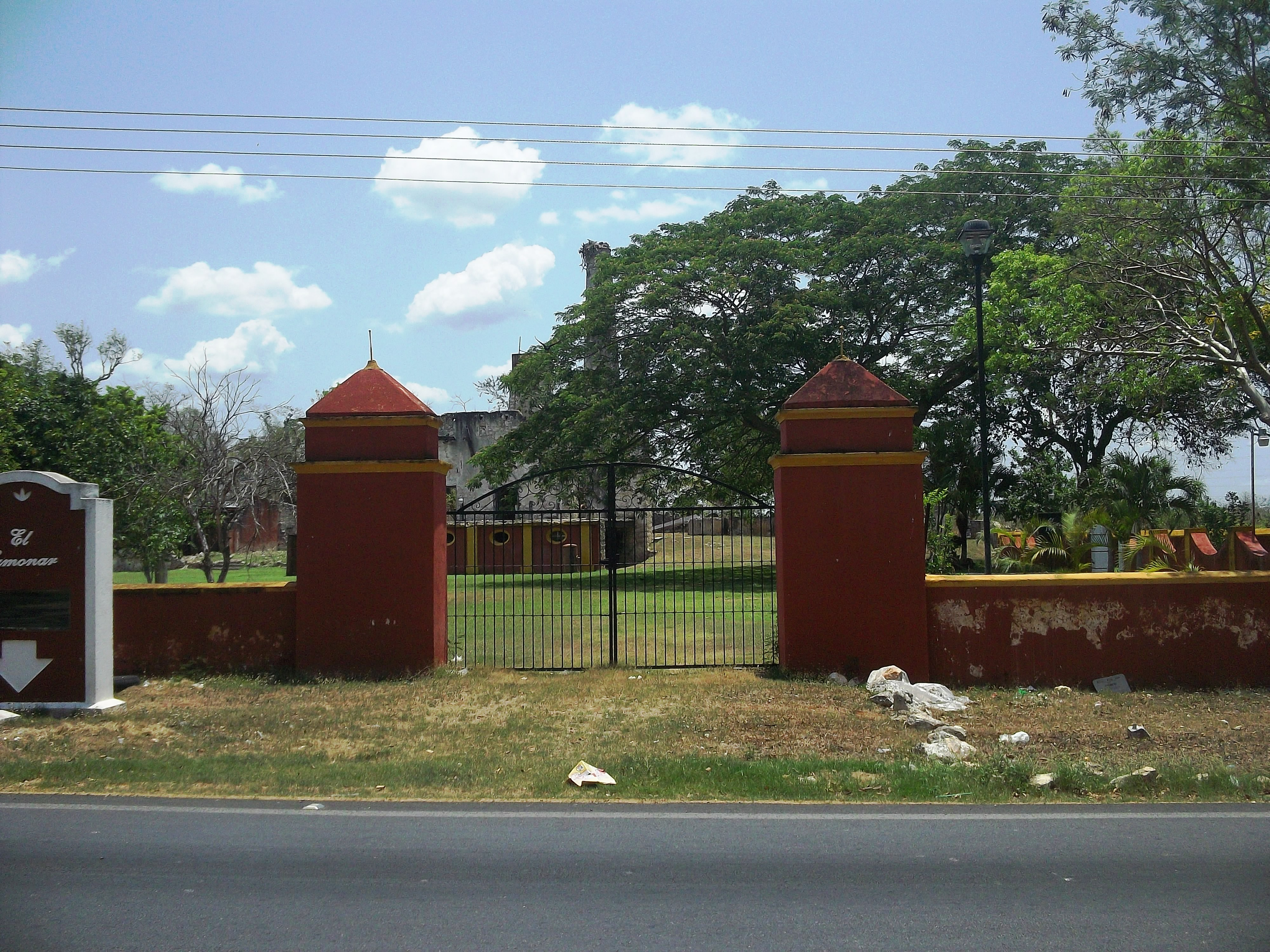
San Antonio Tahdzibichén, Yucatán

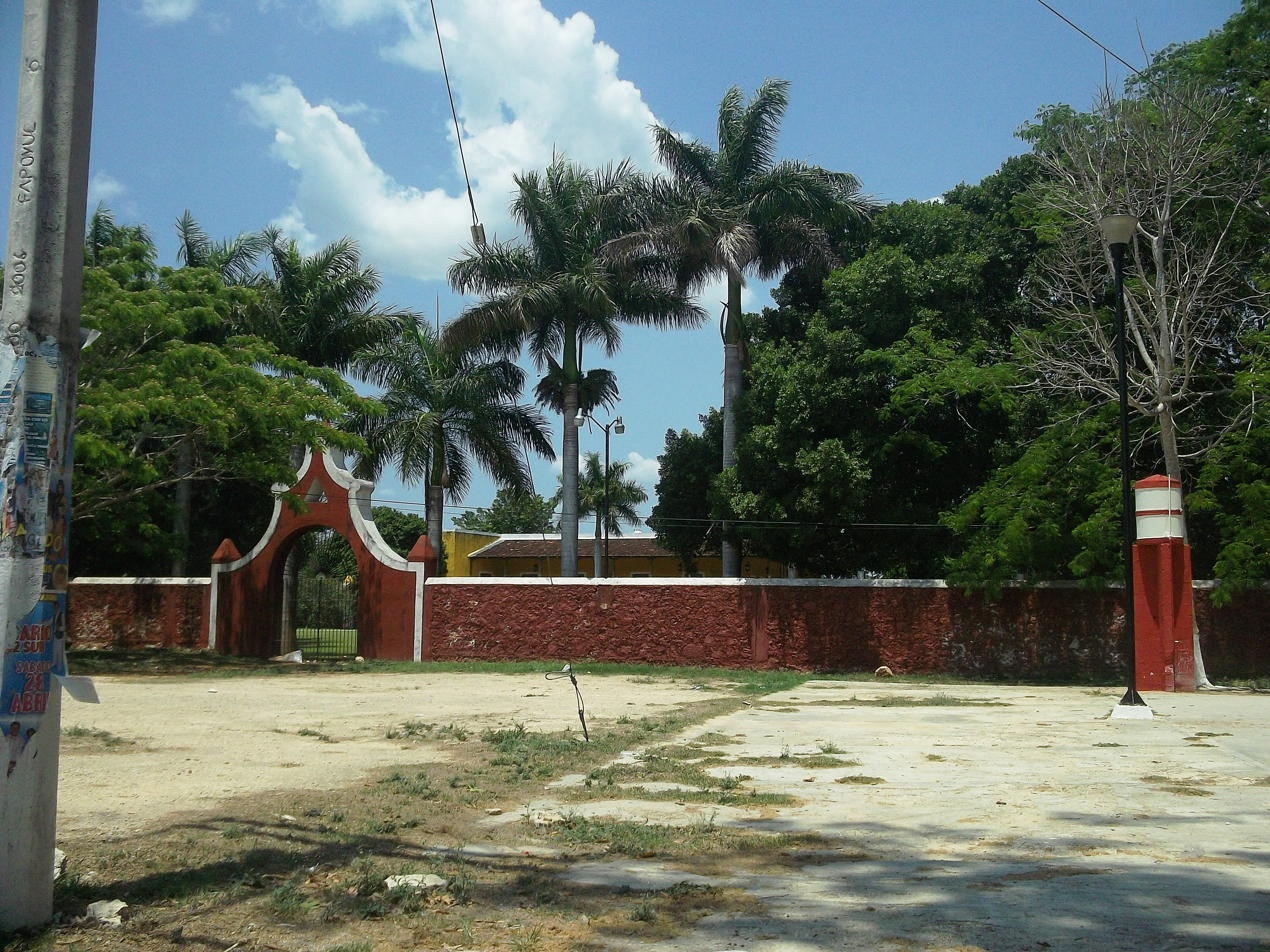
San Ignacio Tesip, Yucatán

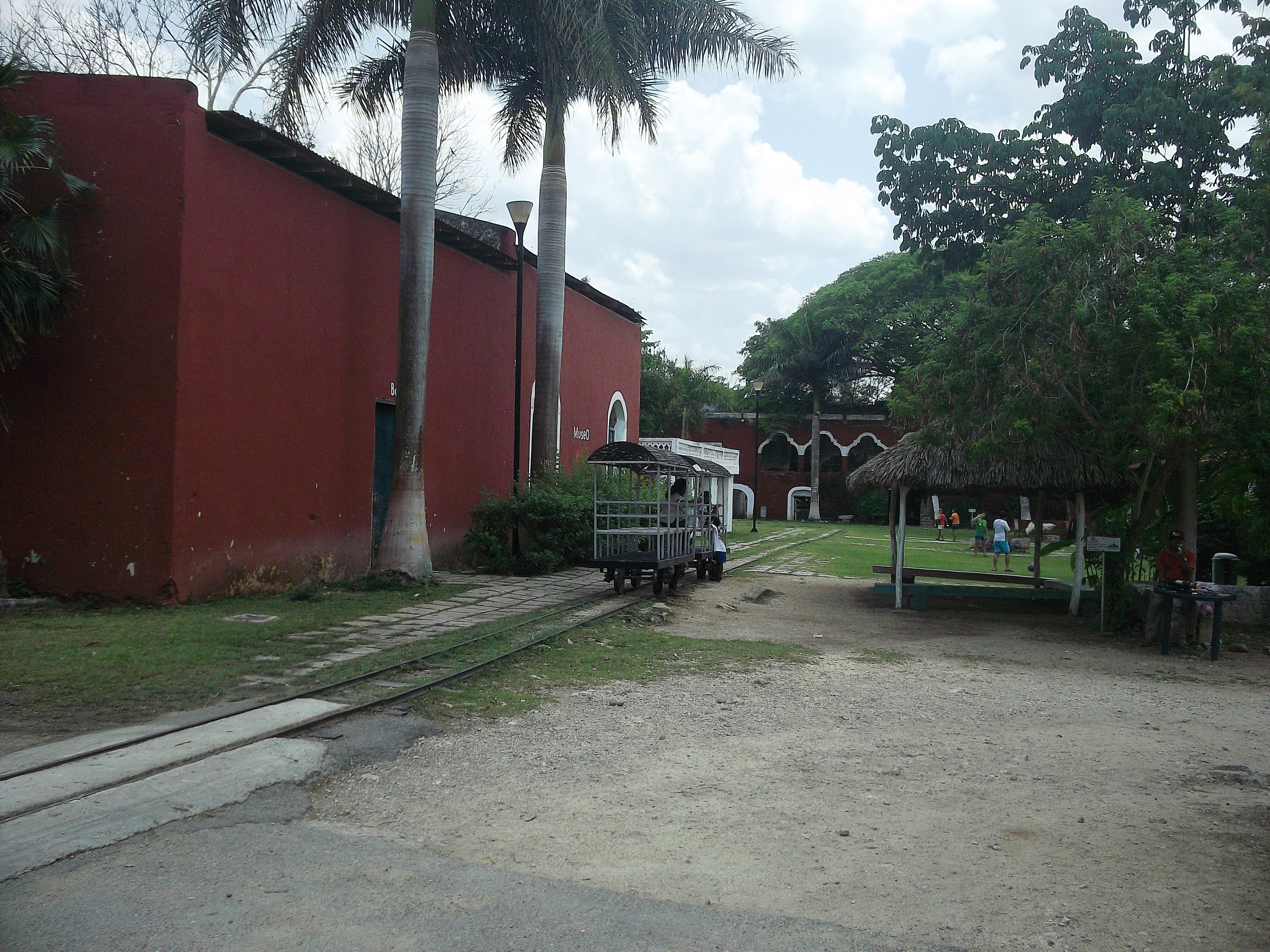
San Nicolás Dzoyaxché, Yucatán

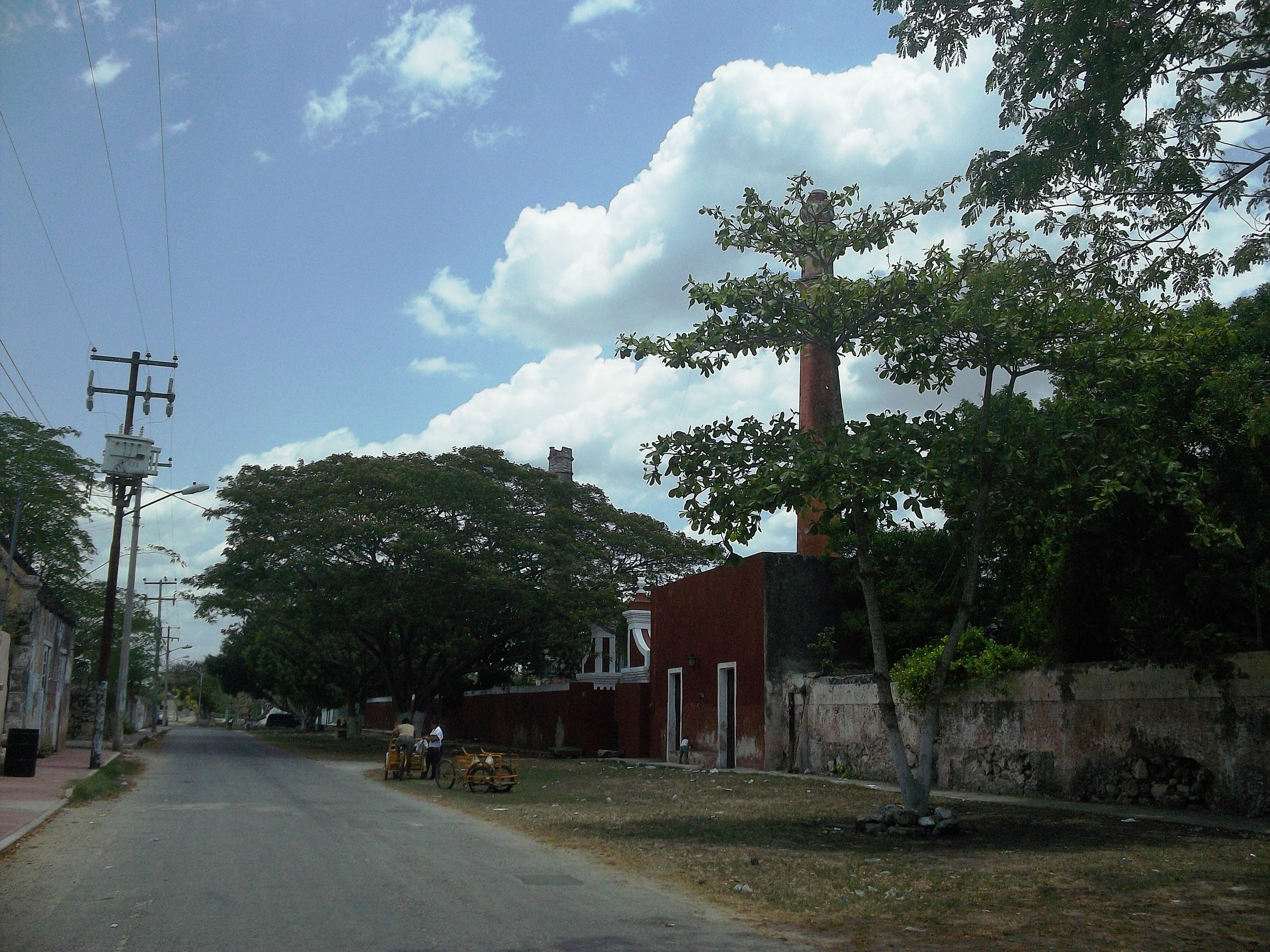
San Pedro Chimay, Yucatán

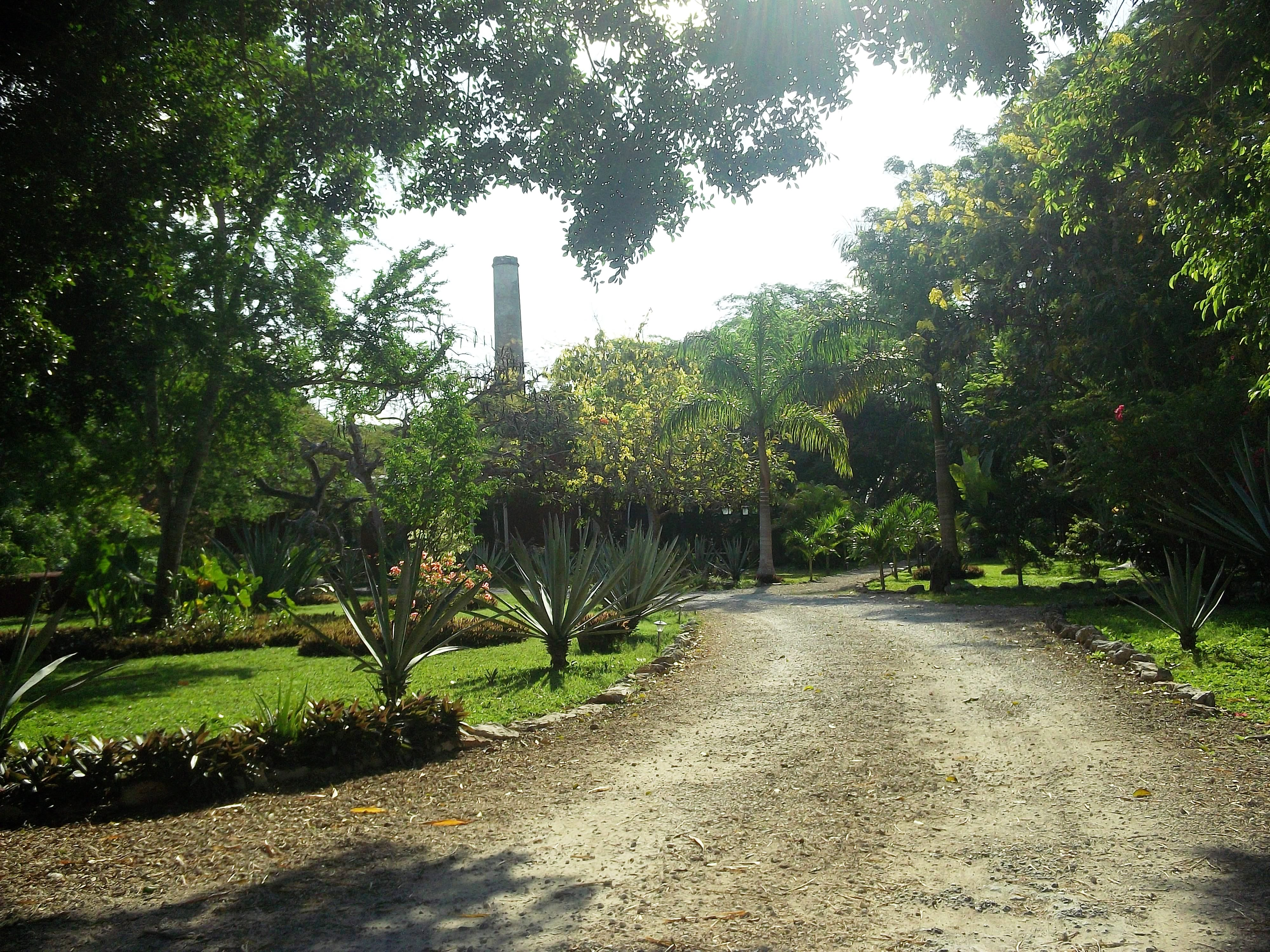
Santa Cruz Palomeque, Yucatán

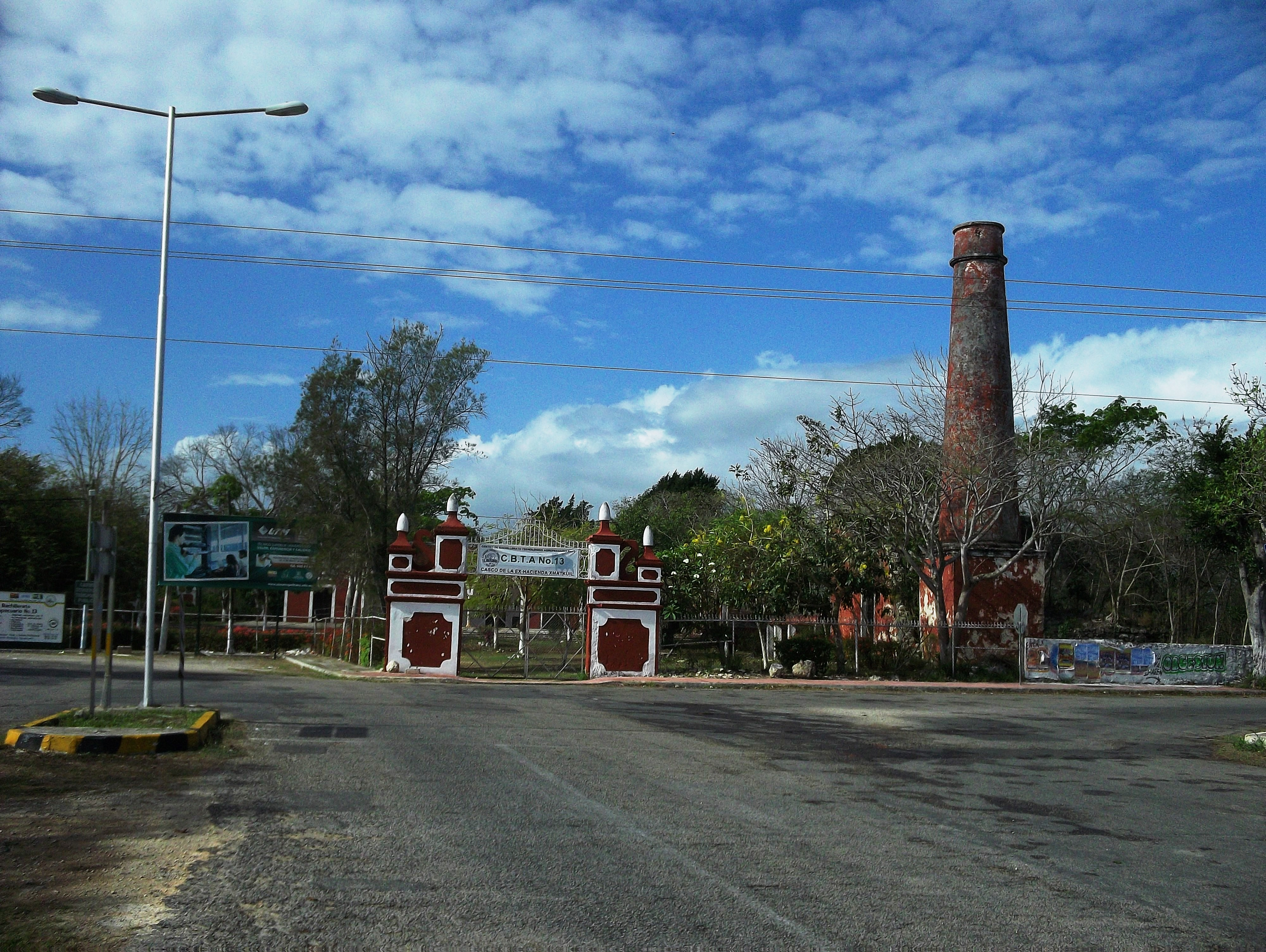
Xmatkuil, Yucatán

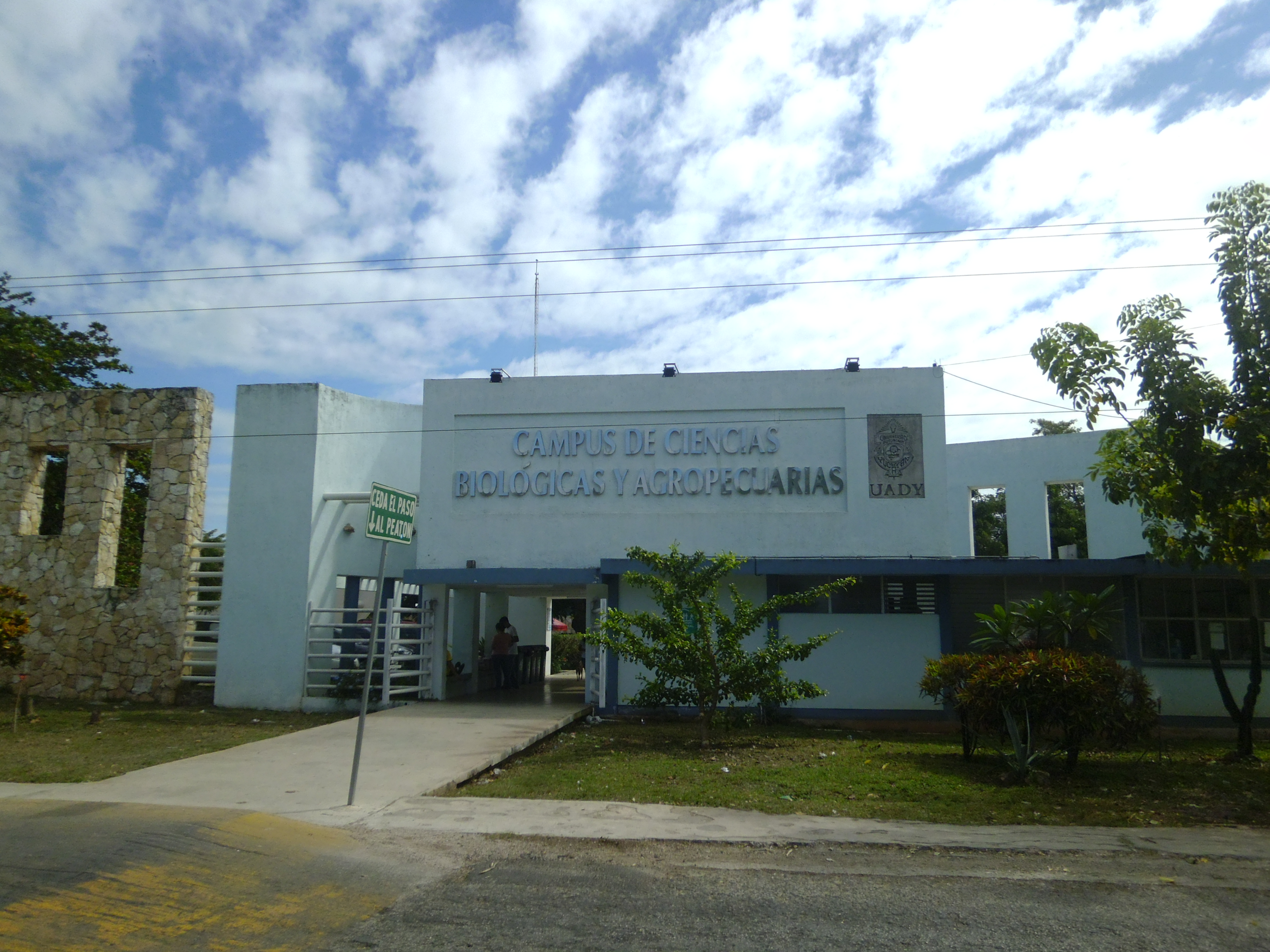
Biology and Agricultural Sciences Campus of the Autonomous University of Yucatán (UADY)
