= Hacienda San Ignacio Tesip =

- Private Event Venue
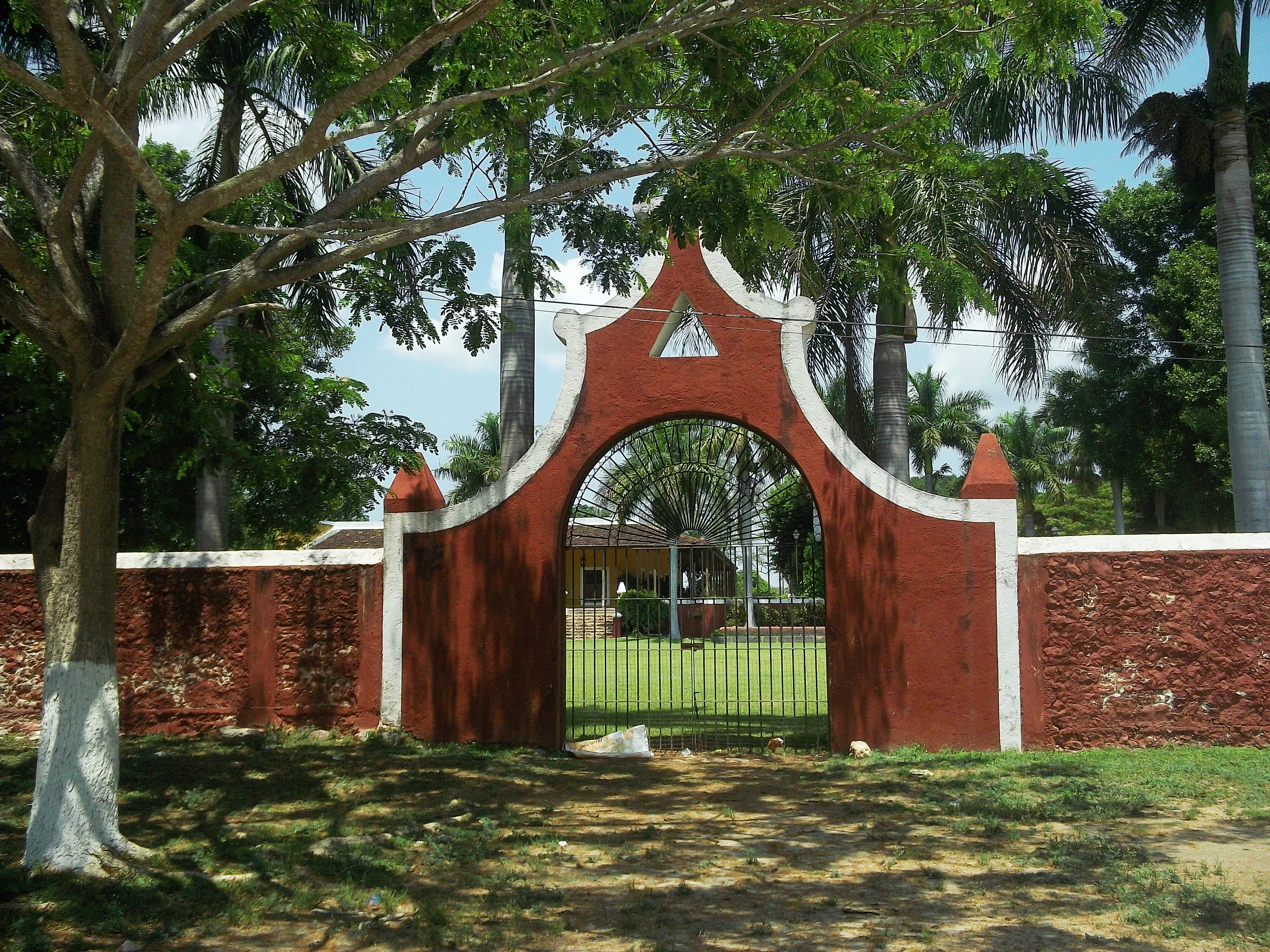
- Entrance Hacienda San Ignacio Tesip, Yucatán.

- Location in Mexico
- Coordinates: 20°50′52″N 89°36′42″W
- Country: Mexico
- Mexican States: Yucatán
- Municipalities: Mérida Municipality
- Time zone: UTC−6 (CST)
  - Summer (DST): UTC−5 (CDT)
- Postal code: 97316
- Area code: 999

Hacienda San Ignacio Tesip is located in the Mérida Municipality in the state of Yucatán in southeastern Mexico. It is one of the properties that arose during the nineteenth century henequen boom. It is part of the Cuxtal Ecological Reserve which was set aside in 1993 to protect both the man-made and natural history of the reserve area of Mérida.

== Toponymy ==
The name (San Ignacio Tesip) is a combination of Maya and Spanish terms. "San Ignacio" is Spanish for Ignatius of Loyola and "Tesip" is derived from the Mayan language. It comes from the words "te", meaning place and "Sip", who is the Mayan goddess of the hunt.

== History ==
On 28 June 1993 the Cuxtal Ecological Reserve was designated to protect the history of the 7 large haciendas, their adjoining pueblas, 12 minor archaeological sites, 6 cenotes and one of Mérida's important water supply stations. Hacienda San Ignacio Tesip was part of this historic designation.

Within the reserve are the following protected haciendas:

- Hacienda Hunxectamán in the village of Uxec Taman
- Hacienda San Antonio Tahdzibichén
- Hacienda San Ignacio Tesip in the village of Tesip
- Hacienda San Nicolás Dzoyaxché, contains Cenote Dzonot-Ich on its grounds
- Hacienda San Pedro Chimay
- Hacienda Santa Cruz Palomeque
- Hacienda Xmatkuil

The hacienda is rented as an event venue for weddings and photographic sessions, and has been filmed in a telenovella (Mexican soap opera). It was featured as "Hacienda Castañón" in the telenovella "Abismo de Pasión" (Abyss of Passion), In the telenovella, the character of Elisa Castañón resides at the hacienda. The soap opera was filmed at the hacienda until its finale in September 2012.

== Demographics ==
All of the henequen plantations ceased to exist as autonomous communities with the agrarian land reform implemented by President Lazaro Cardenas in 1937. His decree turned the haciendas into collective ejidos, leaving only 150 hectares to the former landowners for use as private property. Figures before 1937 indicate populations living on the farm. After 1937, figures indicate those living in the community, as the remaining Hacienda San Ignacio Tesip houses only the owner's immediate family.

According to the 2005 census conducted by the INEGI, the population of the city was 329 inhabitants, of whom 162 were men and 167 were women.

Population of Tesip by year
| Year | 1900 | 1910 | 1921 | 1930 | 1940 | 1950 | 1960 | 1970 | 1980 | 1990 | 1995 | 2000 | 2005 |
| Population | 122 | 106 | 83 | 66 | 85 | 114 | 109 | 107 | 167 | 210 | 253 | 290 | 329 |

== Bibliography ==
- Bracamonte, P and Solís, R., Los espacios de autonomía maya, Ed. UADY, Mérida, 1997.
- Gobierno del Estado de Yucatán, "Los municipios de Yucatán", 1988.
- Kurjack, Edward y Silvia Garza, Atlas arqueológico del Estado de Yucatán, Ed. INAH, 1980.
- Patch, Robert, La formación de las estancias y haciendas en Yucatán durante la colonia, Ed. UADY, 1976.
- Peón Ancona, J. F., "Las antiguas haciendas de Yucatán", en Diario de Yucatán, Mérida, 1971.

== Photo gallery ==
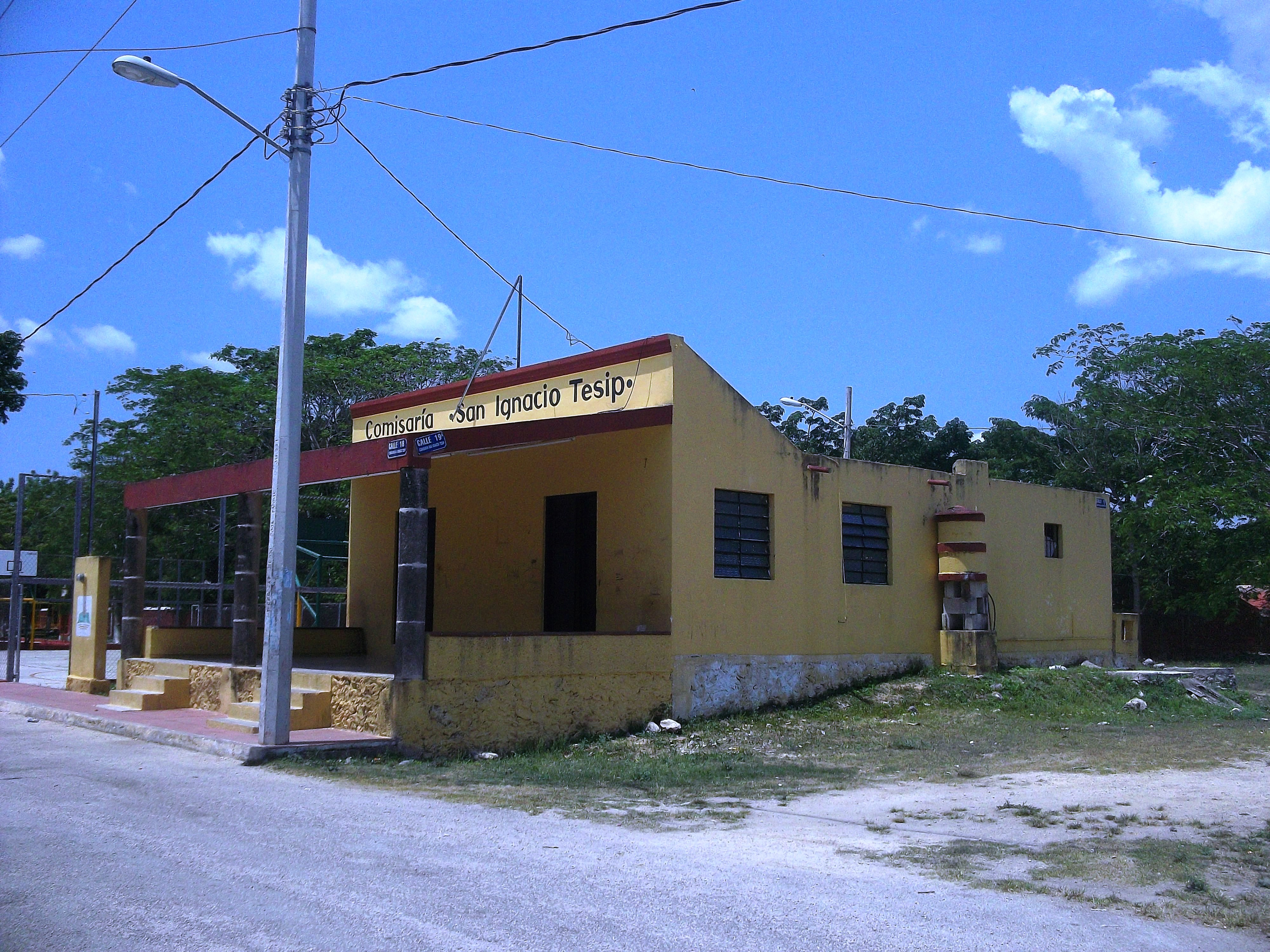
Company Store of Hacienda San Ignacio Tesip.

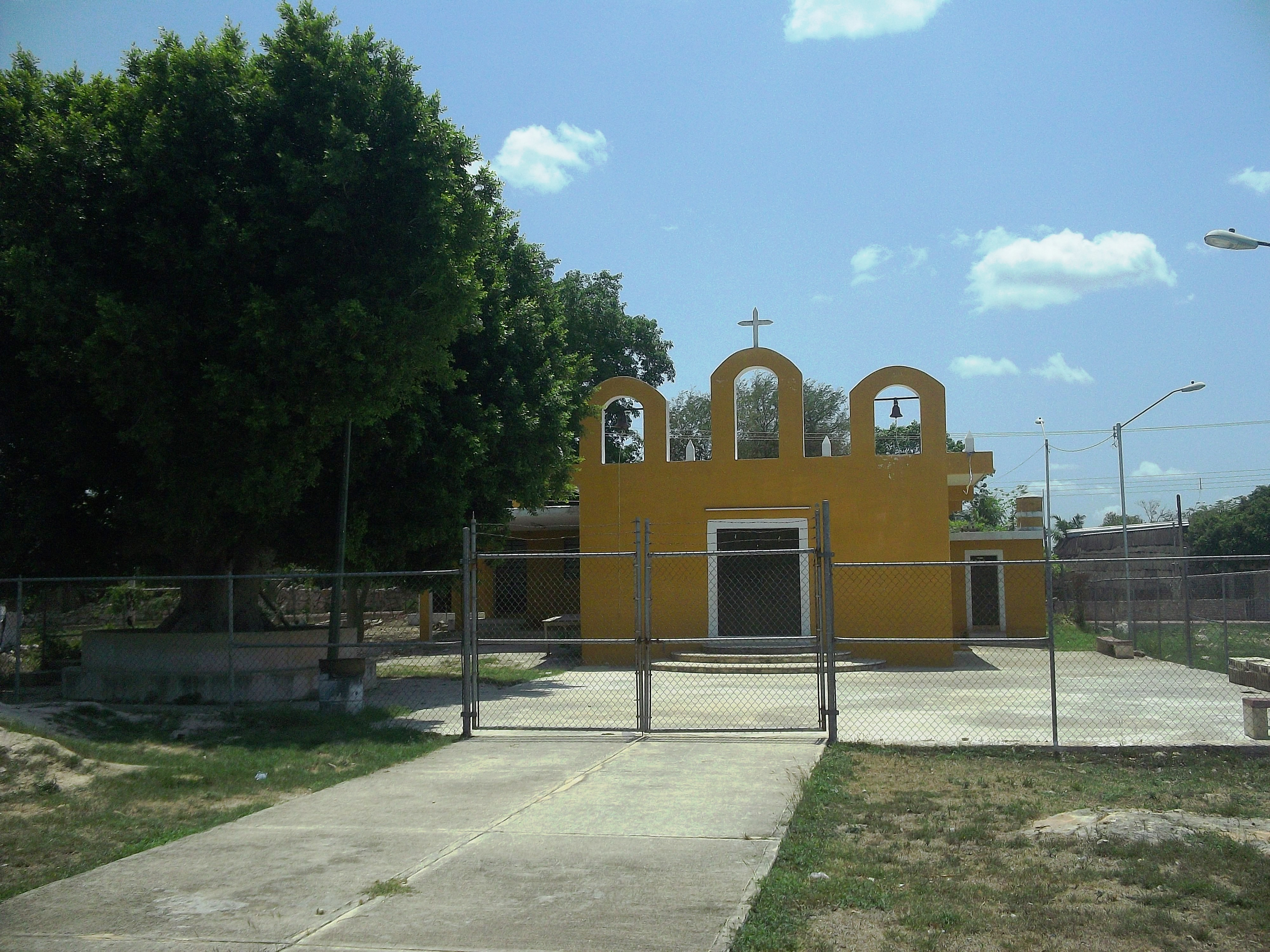
Church of Hacienda San Ignacio Tesip.

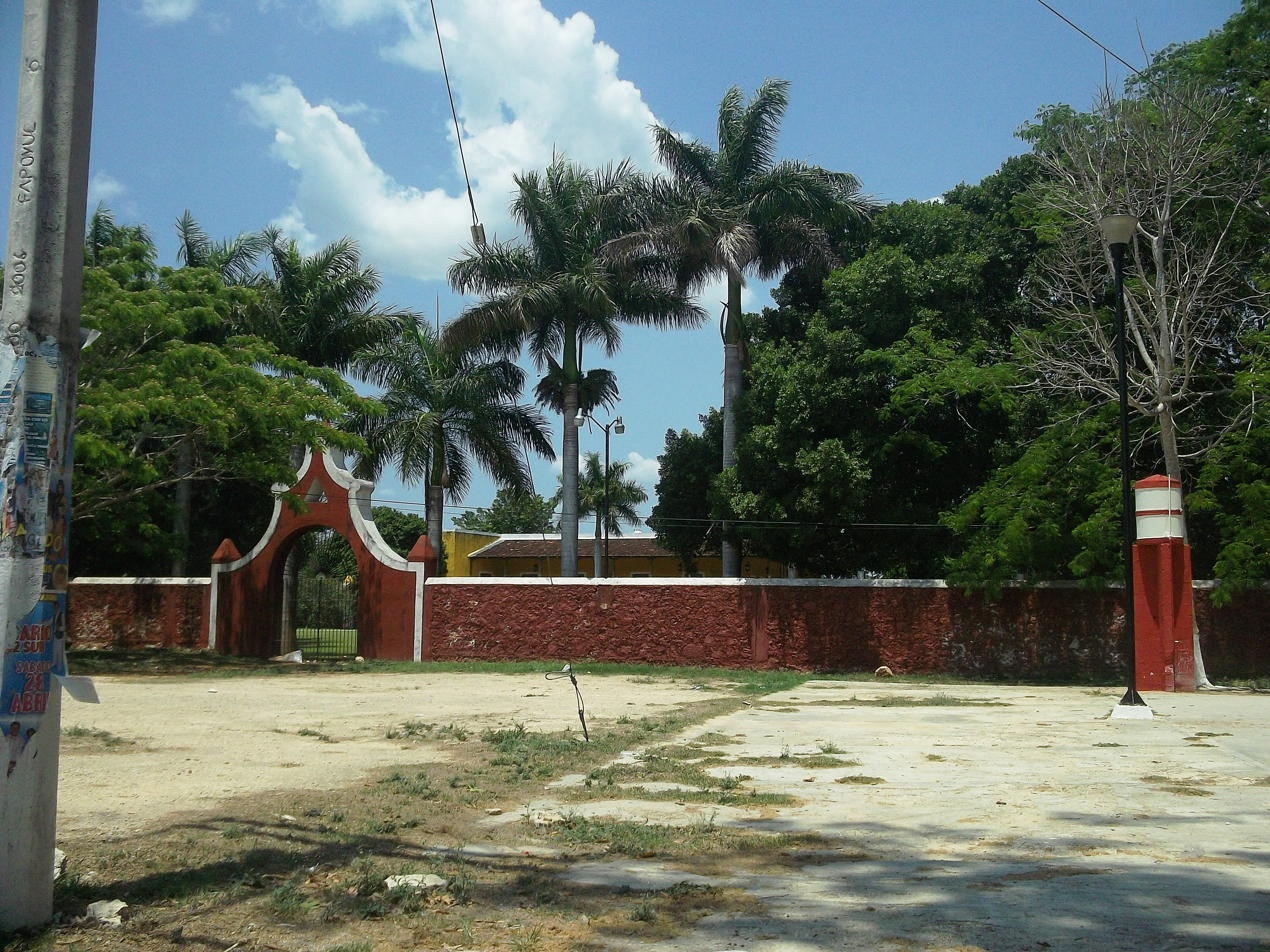
View of Hacienda San Ignacio Tesip.

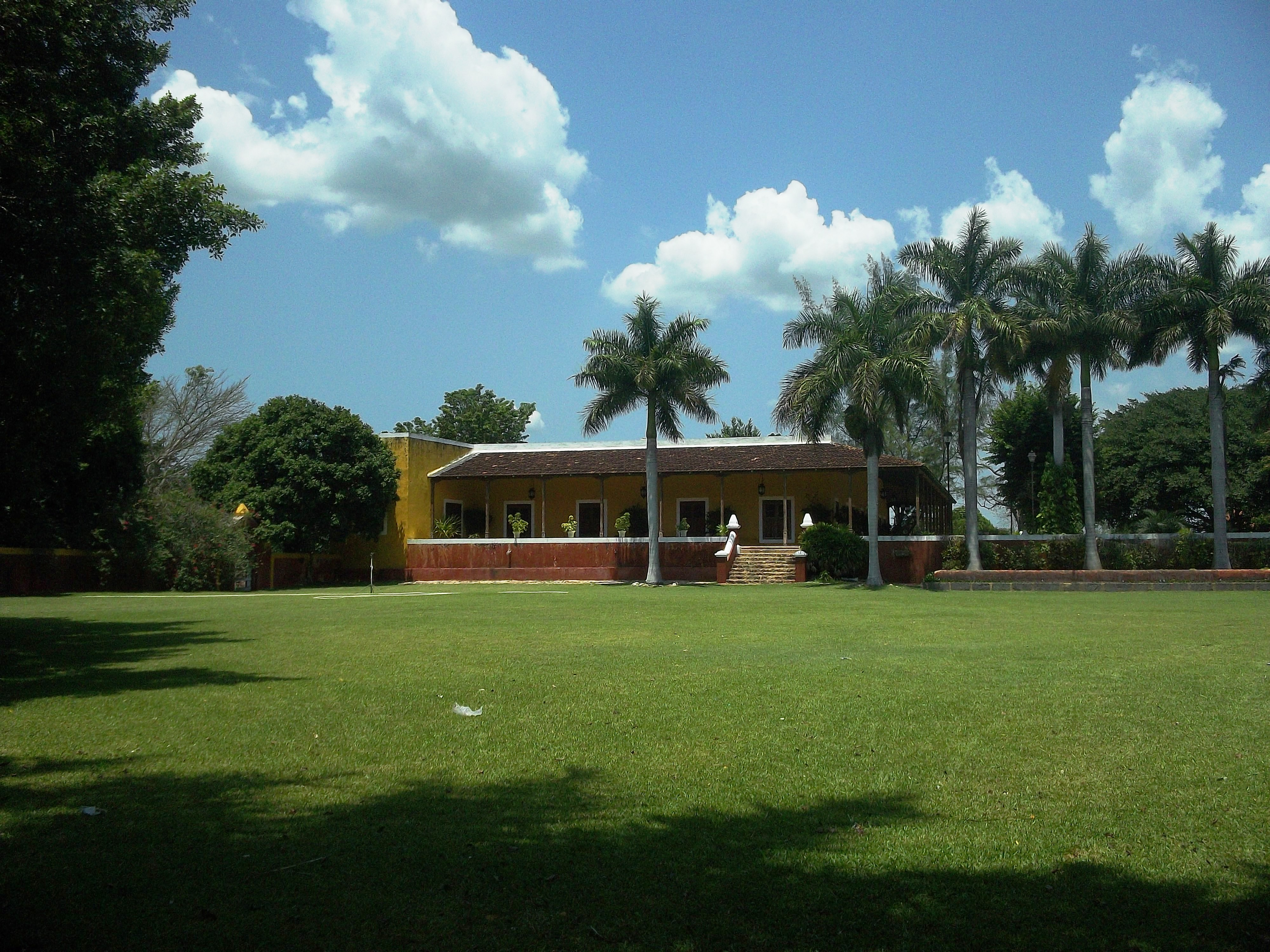
View of Hacienda San Ignacio Tesip.
