= Hacienda Santa Cruz Palomeque =

- Hotel
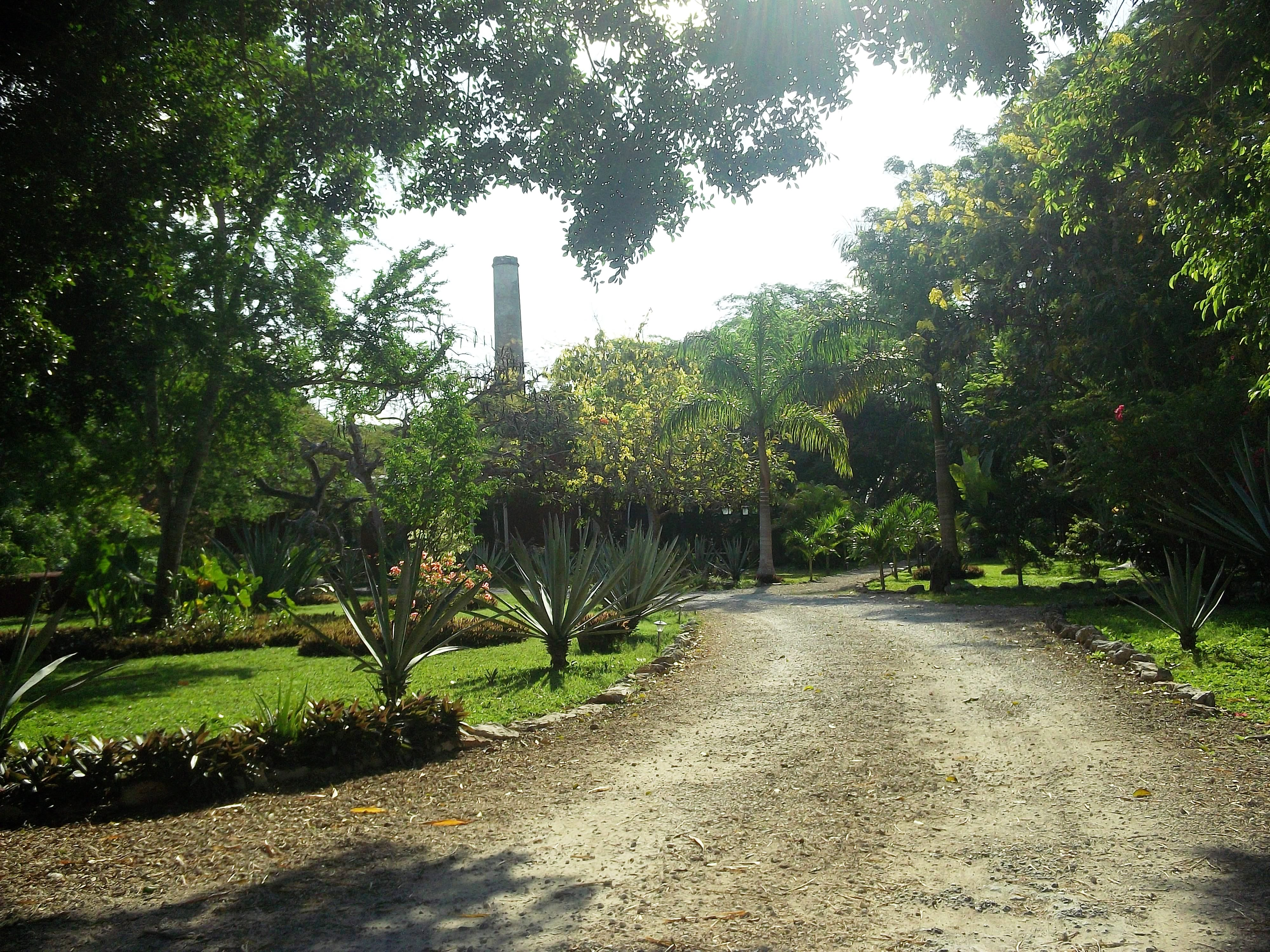
- Entry

- Cuxtal Ecological Reserve

- Location in Mexico
- Coordinates: 20°52′45″N 89°39′13″W
- Country: Mexico
- Mexican States: Yucatán
- Municipalities: Mérida Municipality
- Time zone: UTC−6 (CST)
  - Summer (DST): UTC−5 (CDT)
- Postal code: 97315
- Area code: 999

Hacienda Santa Cruz Palomeque is located in the Mérida Municipality in the state of Yucatán in southeastern Mexico. It is one of the properties that arose during the nineteenth century henequen boom. It is part of the Cuxtal Ecological Reserve which was set aside in 1993 to protect both the man-made and natural history of the reserve area of Mérida.

== Toponymy ==
The name (Santa Cruz Palomeque) is a combination of Spanish terms. "Santa Cruz" (holy cross in English) is a reference to the Brotherhood of the Holy Cross and Palomeque is the surname of one of the former owners, José María Palomeque, who also owned part of Hacienda Chenkú.

== How to get there ==
The property is located south of Mérida. Take Periférico south to exit "Dzununcan, Avenida 86" and turn toward Dzununcan for 1 km.

== History ==
The original property of Hacienda Santa Cruz was designated as a Franciscan monastery in 1640. It was later operated as a henequen production farm by José María Palomeque.

On 28 June 1993 the Cuxtal Ecological Reserve was designated to protect the history of the 7 large haciendas, their adjoining pueblas, 12 minor archaeological sites, 6 cenotes and one of Merida's important water supply stations. Hacienda Santa Cruz Palomeque was part of this historic designation.

Within the reserve are the following protected haciendas:

- Hacienda Hunxectamán in the village of Uxec Taman
- Hacienda San Antonio Tahdzibichén
- Hacienda San Ignacio Tesip in the village of Tesip
- Hacienda San Nicolás Dzoyaxché, contains Cenote Dzonot-Ich on its grounds
- Hacienda San Pedro Chimay
- Hacienda Santa Cruz Palomeque
- Hacienda Xmatkuil

In 2007 Robert and Carolyn Franck bought the abandoned estate and renovated it. The estate currently operates as a boutique hotel and can be rented for private events.

== Architecture ==
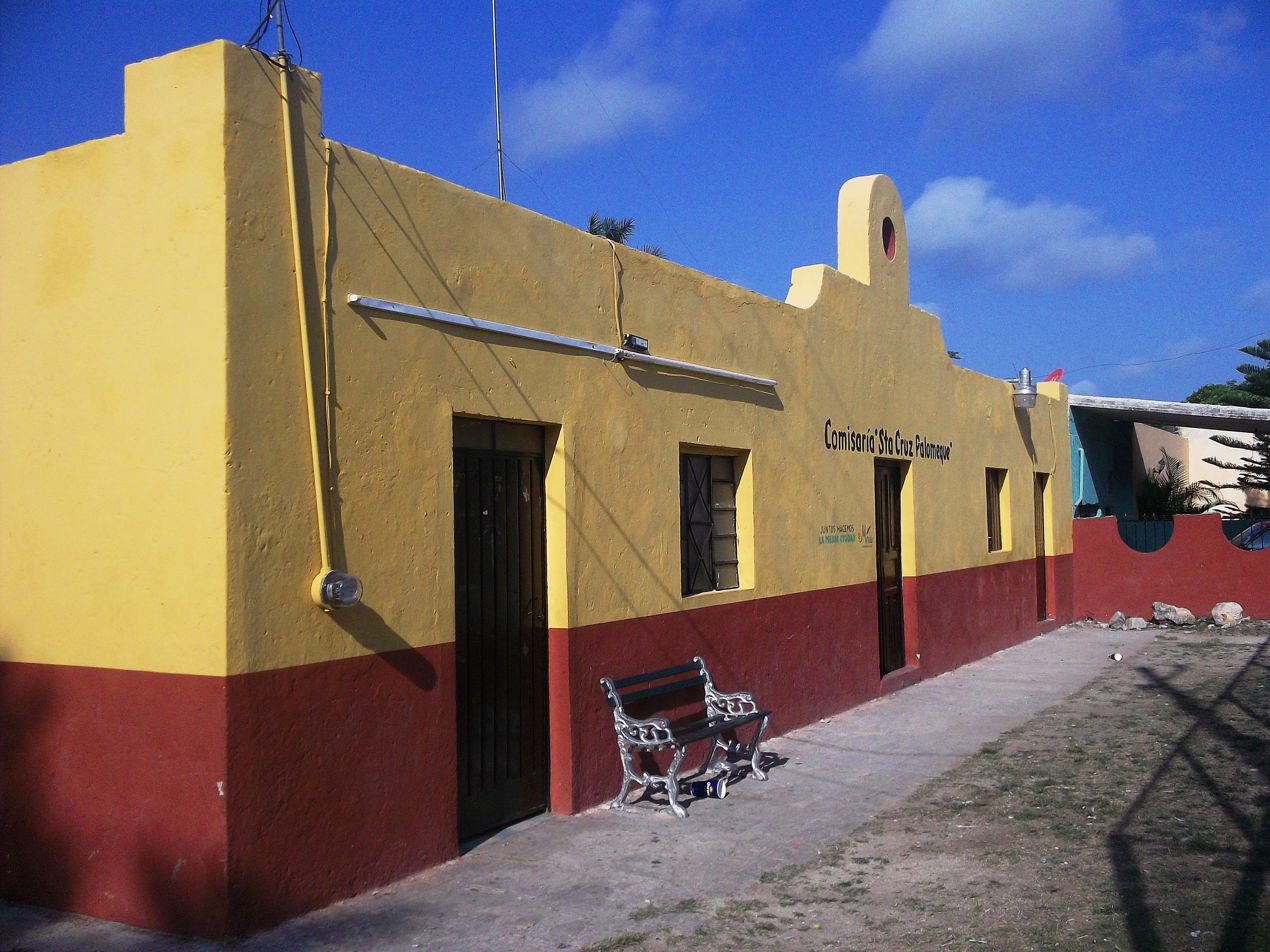
Company Store of Hacienda Santa Cruz Palomeque

The estate has an area of 7 hectares with several buildings, extensive gardens and vestiges of old buildings. The whole area is surrounded by stone walls and shaded by large trees.

The Main House was built in the colonial style with stone walls 1.8 meters thick and stone floors. The very high ceilings and arches of the corridor allowed the entry of horse-drawn carriages.

The powerhouse was the most important building of the estate during the henequen phase, as it was where the sisal fiber was processed into rope. The powerhouse has been converted into a bar and reception hall, accessed via a library staircase from a courtyard below.

The Chapel was severely damaged by Hurricane Gilberto in 1988. It has been fully restored. The sculpted beam that supported the old roof was rescued and re-installed. The chapel has been re-sanctified and occasional Masses, baptisms and weddings are celebrated.

== Demographics ==
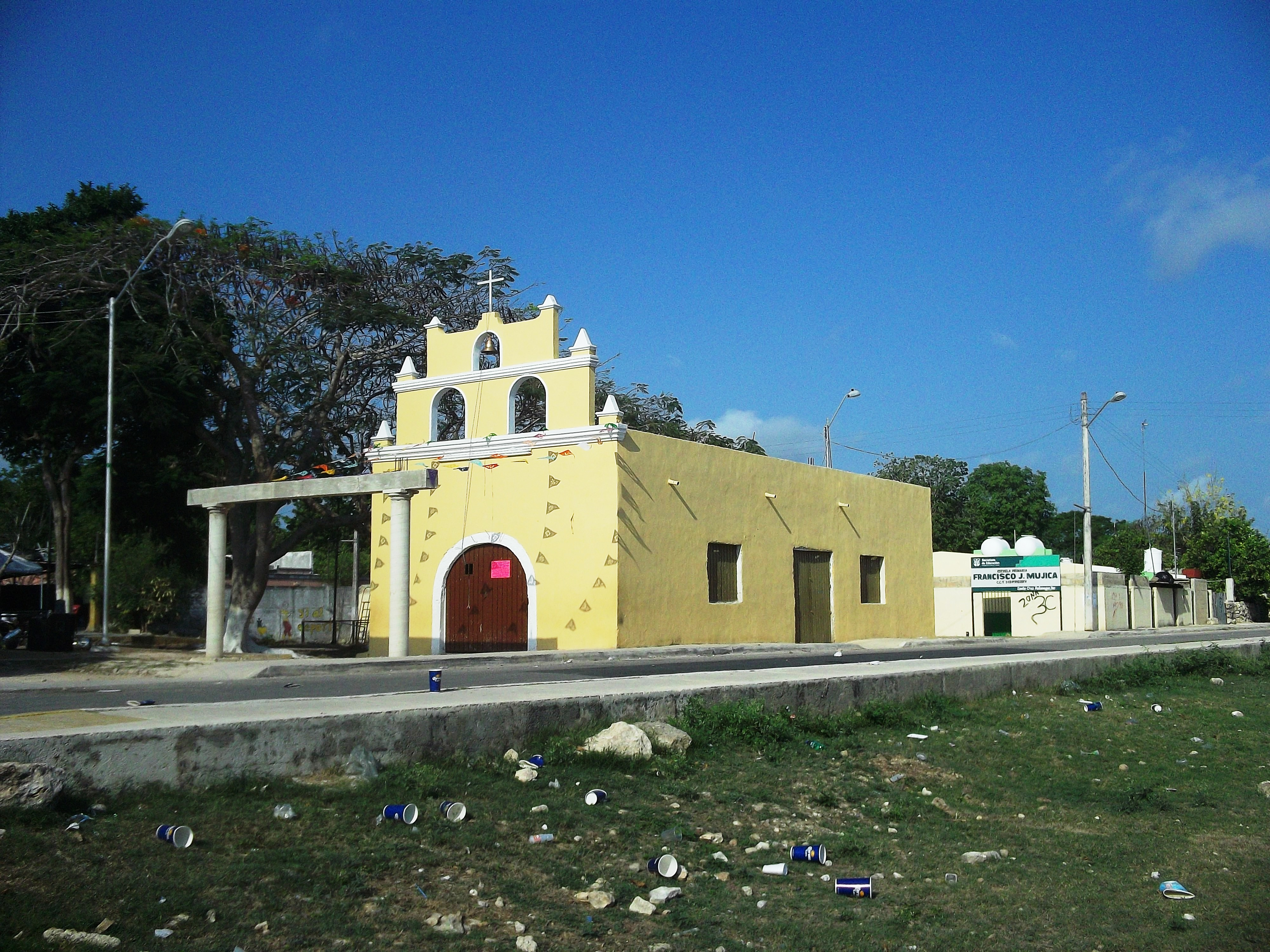
Church at Hacienda Santa Cruz Palomeque

All of the henequen plantations ceased to exist as autonomous communities with the agrarian land reform implemented by President Lazaro Cardenas in 1937. His decree turned the haciendas into collective ejidos, leaving only 150 hectares to the former landowners for use as private property. Figures before 1937 indicate populations living on the farm. After 1937, figures indicate those living in the community, as the remaining Hacienda Santa Cruz Palomeque houses only the owner's immediate family.

According to the 2005 census conducted by the INEGI, the population of the city was 718 inhabitants, of whom 372 were men and 346 were women.

Population of Santa Cruz Palomeque by year
Year	1900	1910	1921	1930	1940	1950	1960	1970	1980	1990	1995	2000	2005
Population	7	0	17	154	106	155	220	202	276	374	419	567	718

== Bibliography ==
- Bracamonte, P and Solís, R., Los espacios de autonomía maya, Ed. UADY, Mérida, 1997.
- Gobierno del Estado de Yucatán, "Los municipios de Yucatán", 1988.
- Kurjack, Edward y Silvia Garza, Atlas arqueológico del Estado de Yucatán, Ed. INAH, 1980.
- Patch, Robert, La formación de las estancias y haciendas en Yucatán durante la colonia, Ed. UADY, 1976.
- Peón Ancona, J. F., "Las antiguas haciendas de Yucatán", en Diario de Yucatán, Mérida, 1971.
