= Hacienda Hunxectamán =

- Private Event Venue
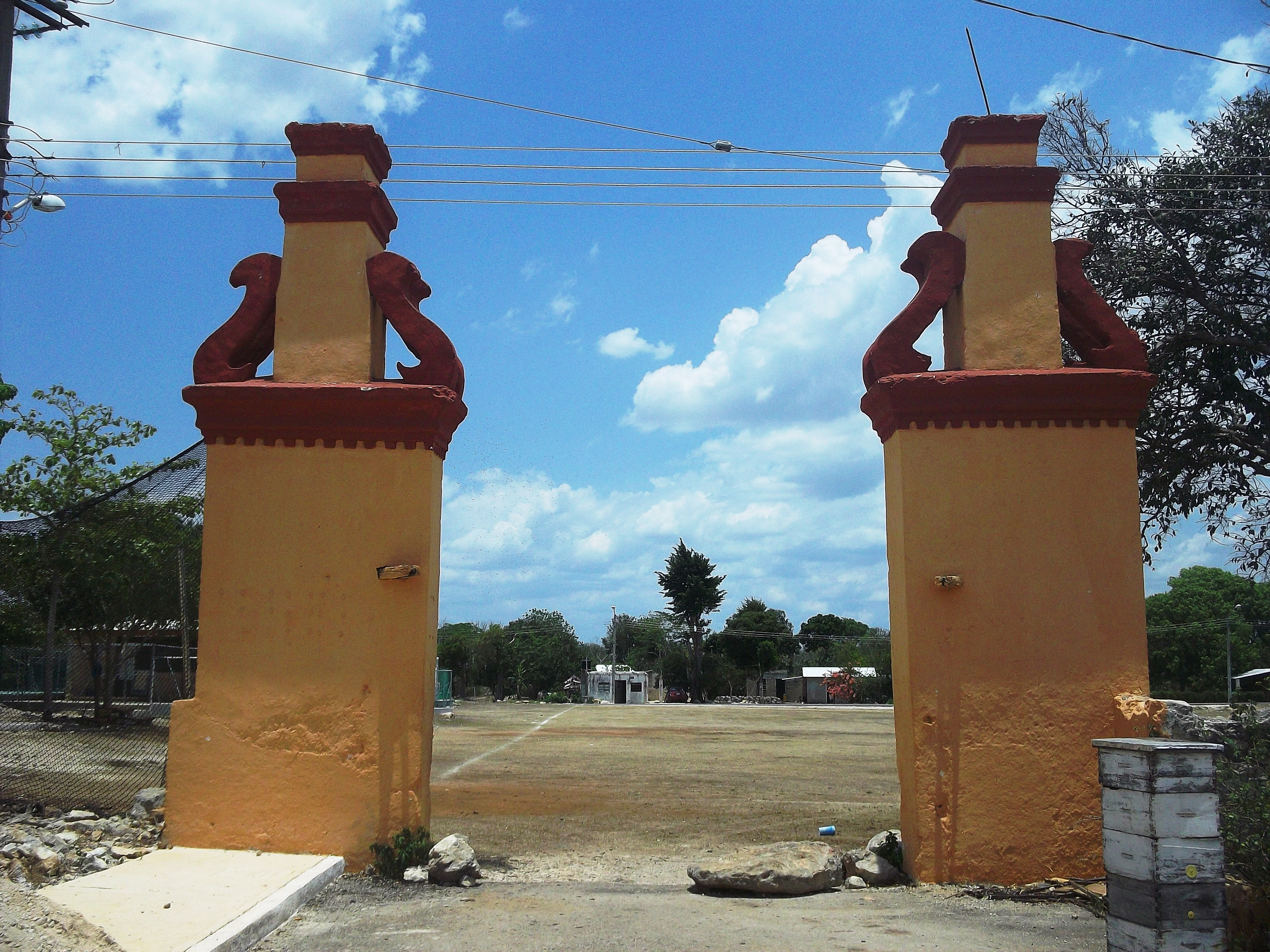
- Entrance Hacienda Hunxectamán, Yucatán.

- Location in Mexico
- Coordinates: 20°52′57″N 89°33′31″W
- Country: Mexico
- Mexican States: Yucatán
- Municipalities: Mérida Municipality
- Time zone: UTC−6 (CST)
  - Summer (DST): UTC−5 (CDT)
- Postal code: 97316
- Area code: 999

Hacienda Hunxectamán is located in the Mérida Municipality in the state of Yucatán in southeastern Mexico. It is one of the properties that arose during the nineteenth century henequen boom. It is part of the Cuxtal Ecological Reserve which was set aside in 1993 to protect both the man-made and natural history of the reserve area of Mérida.

== Toponymy ==
The name (Hunxectamán) is a word derived from the Yucatec Mayan language, which can be spelled as Hunxactaman, Hunxectamán, or Uxec Taman. It comes from the words "hun" meaning one, "xec" meaning group and "taman" meaning sheep (ram/lamb).

== How to get there ==
The property is located 11 km south of Mérida on Calle 77.

== History ==
On 28 June 1993 the Cuxtal Ecological Reserve was designated to protect the history of the 7 large haciendas, their adjoining pueblas, 12 minor archaeological sites, 6 cenotes and one of Mérida's important water supply stations. Hacienda Hunxectamán was part of this historic designation.

Within the reserve are the following protected haciendas:

- Hacienda Hunxectamán in the village of Uxec Taman
- Hacienda San Antonio Tahdzibichén
- Hacienda San Ignacio Tesip in the village of Tesip
- Hacienda San Nicolás Dzoyaxché, contains Cenote Dzonot-Ich on its grounds
- Hacienda San Pedro Chimay
- Hacienda Santa Cruz Palomeque
- Hacienda Xmatkuil

== Demographics ==
All of the henequen plantations ceased to exist as autonomous communities with the agrarian land reform implemented by President Lazaro Cardenas in 1937. His decree turned the haciendas into collective ejidos, leaving only 150 hectares to the former landowners for use as private property. Figures before 1937 indicate populations living on the farm. After 1937, figures indicate those living in the community, as the remaining Hacienda Hunxectamán houses only the owner's immediate family.

According to the 2005 census conducted by the INEGI, the population of the city was 104 inhabitants, of whom 55 were men and 49 were women.

Population of Hunxectamán (also shown as Uxec Taman) by year
Year	1900	1910	1921	1930	1940	1950	1960	1970	1980	1990	1995	2000	2005
Population	114	94	120	95	61	39	0	0	0	80	119	143	143

== Bibliography ==
- Bracamonte, P and Solís, R., Los espacios de autonomía maya, Ed. UADY, Mérida, 1997.
- Gobierno del Estado de Yucatán, "Los municipios de Yucatán", 1988.
- Kurjack, Edward y Silvia Garza, Atlas arqueológico del Estado de Yucatán, Ed. INAH, 1980.
- Patch, Robert, La formación de las estancias y haciendas en Yucatán durante la colonia, Ed. UADY, 1976.
- Peón Ancona, J. F., "Las antiguas haciendas de Yucatán", en Diario de Yucatán, Mérida, 1971.

== Photo gallery ==
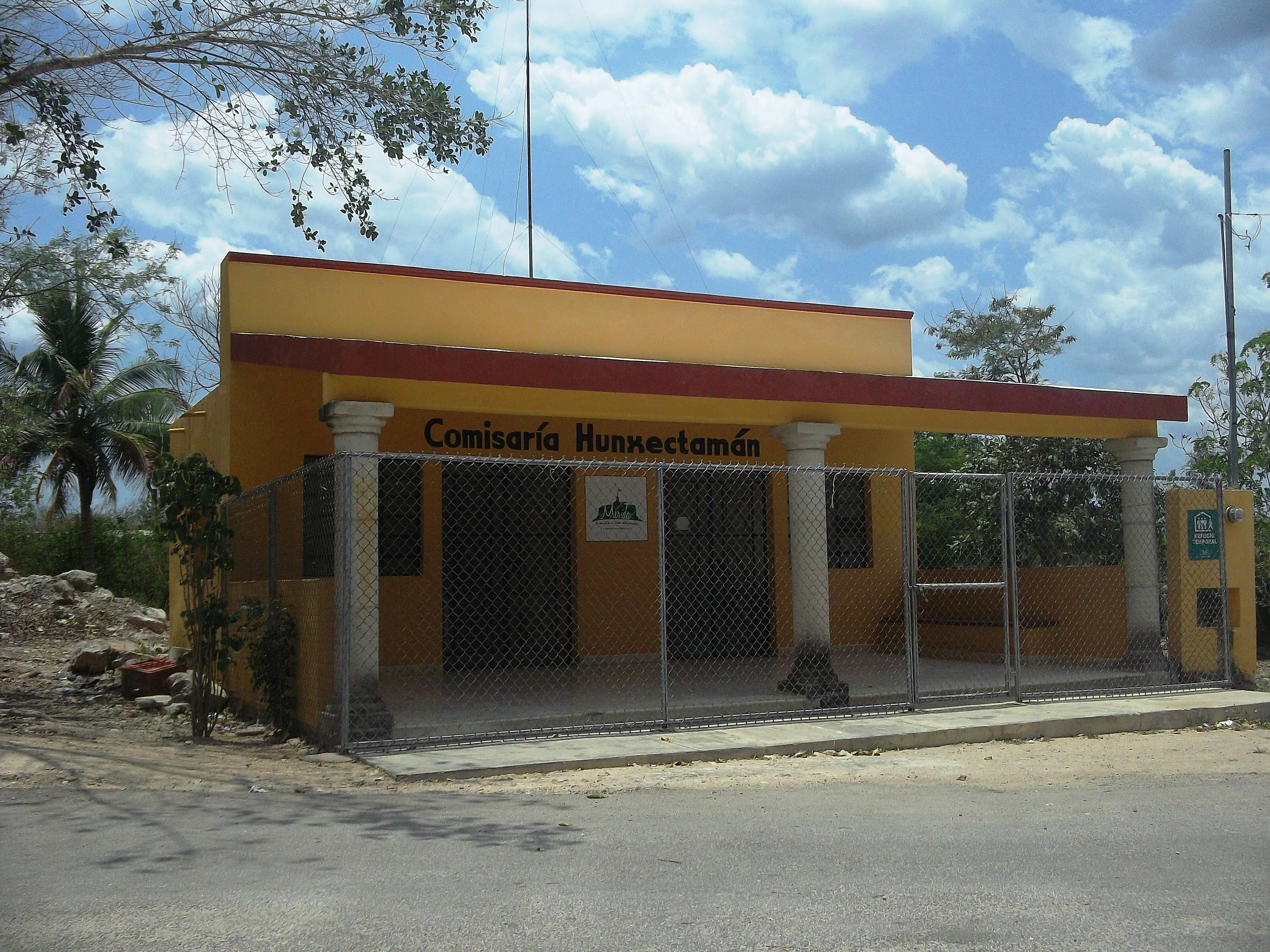
Company Store of Hacienda Hunxectamán

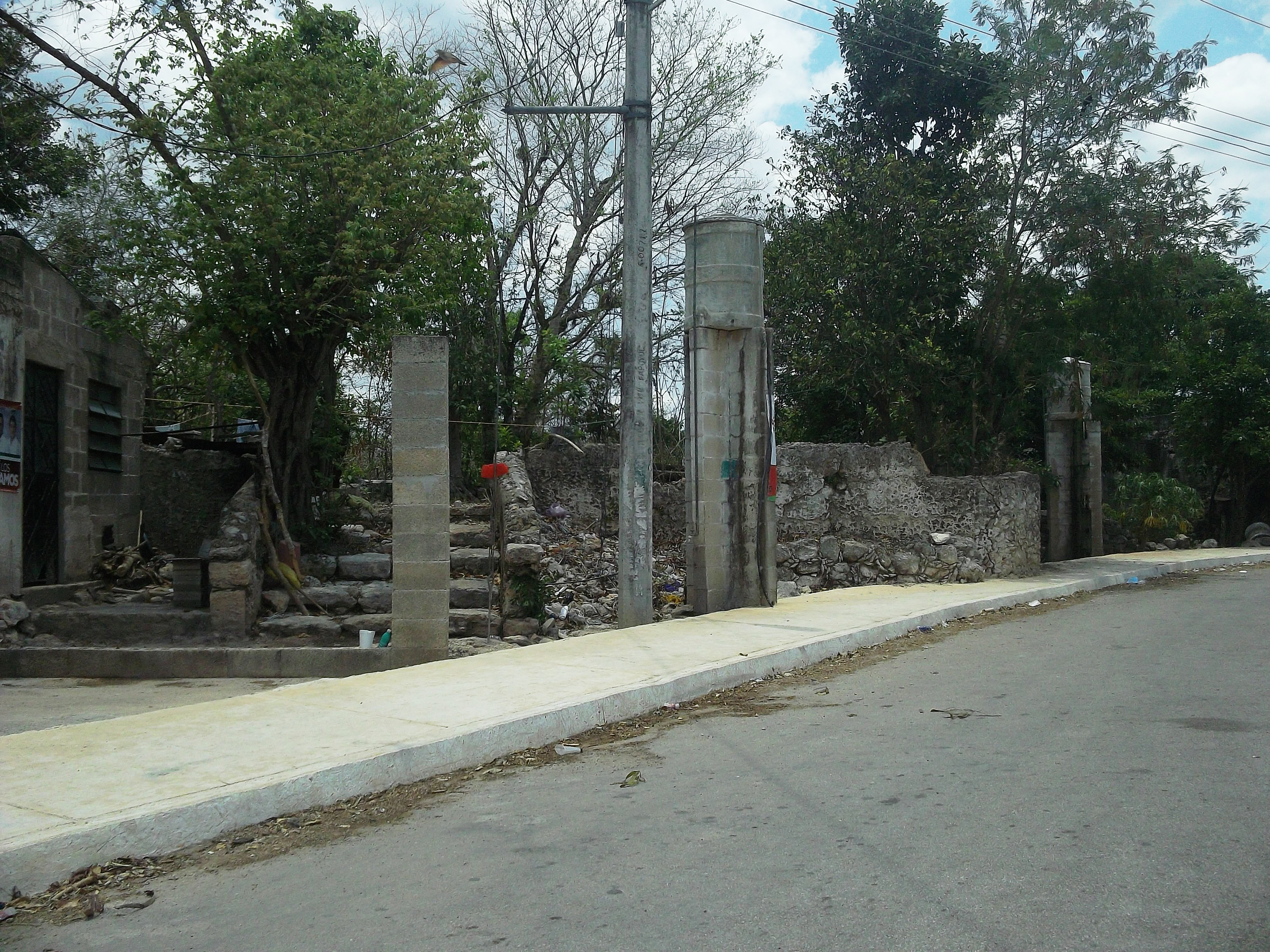
View of Hacienda Hunxectamán

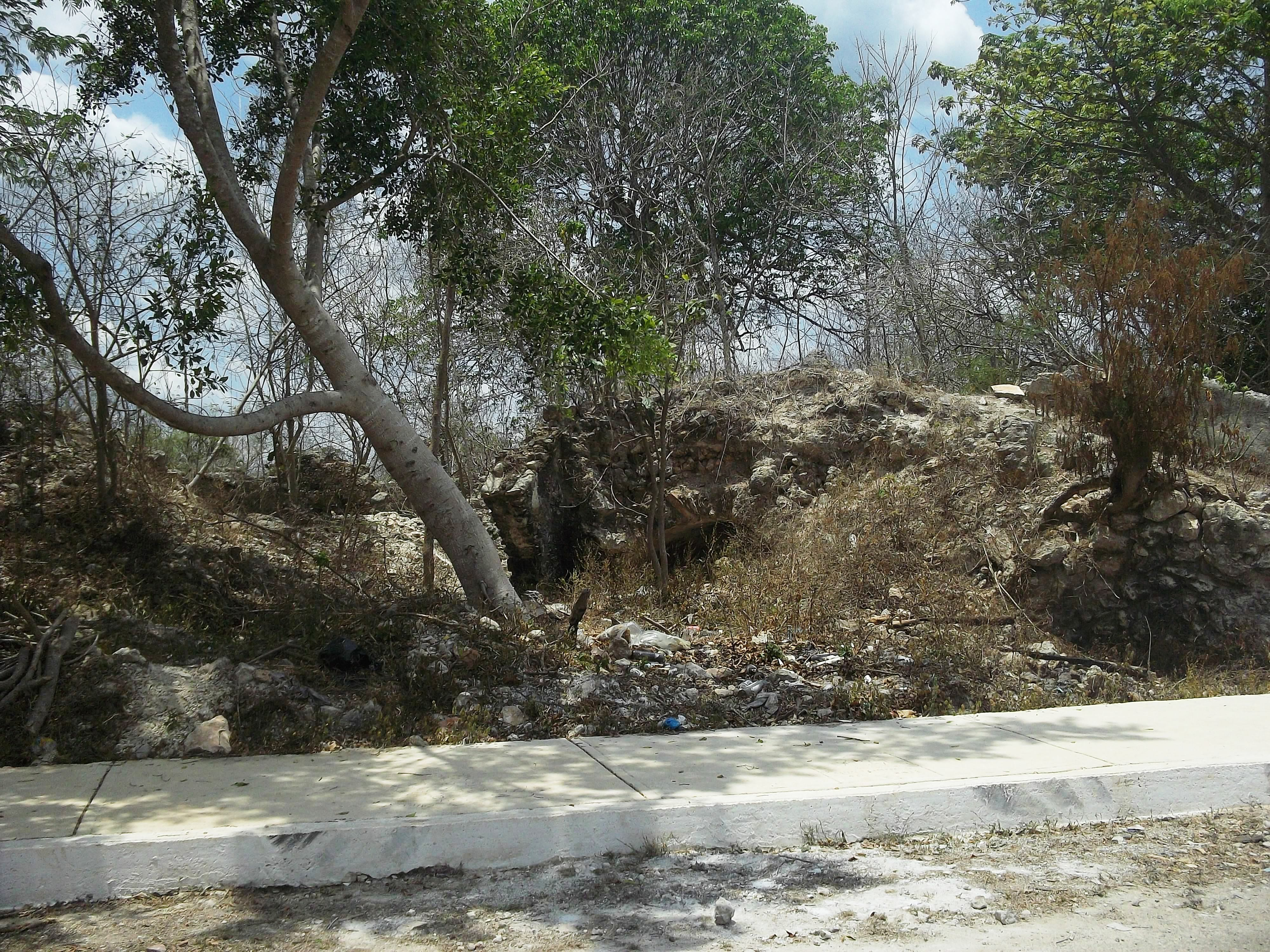
View of Hacienda Hunxectamán

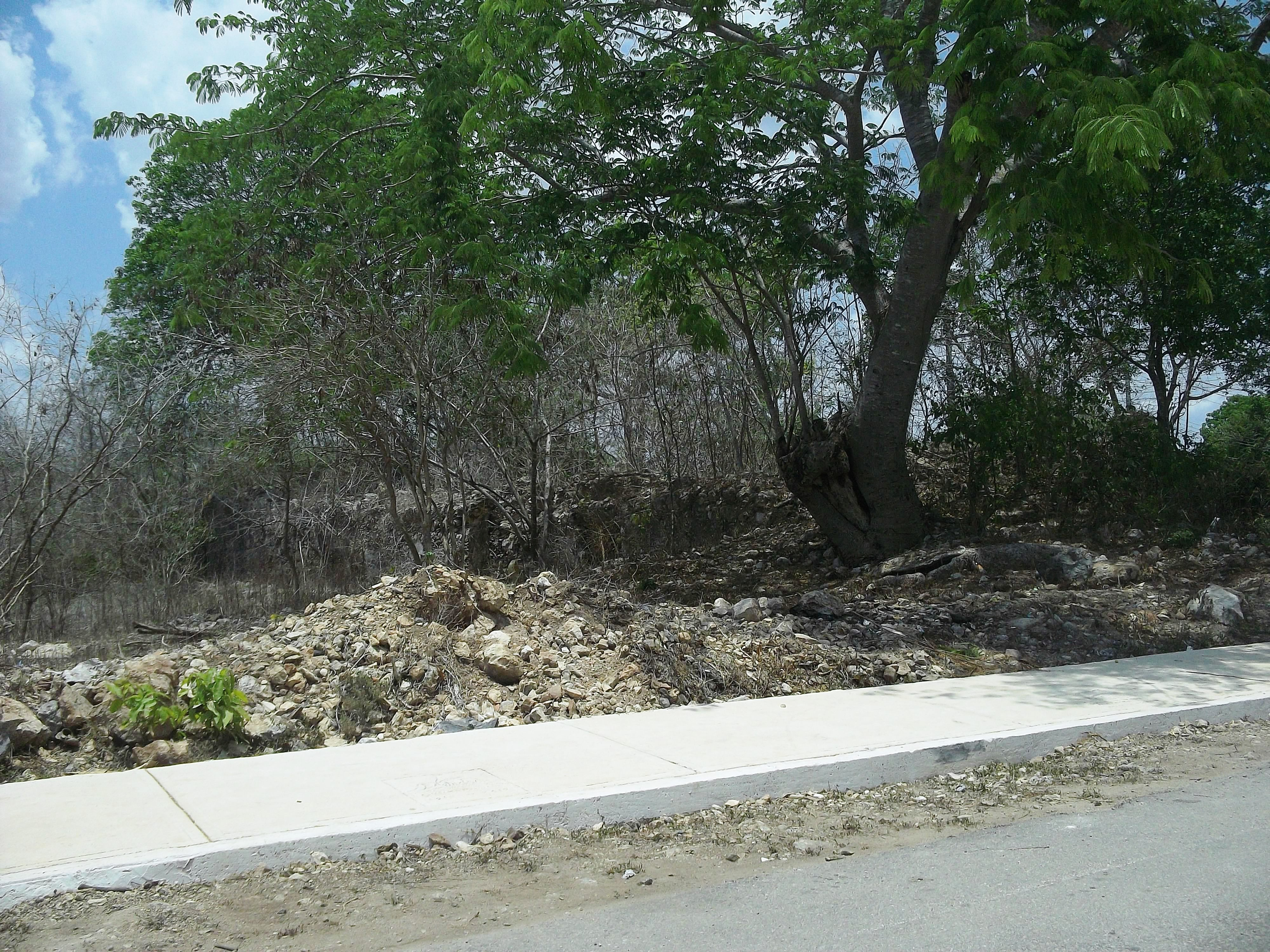
View of Hacienda Hunxectamán

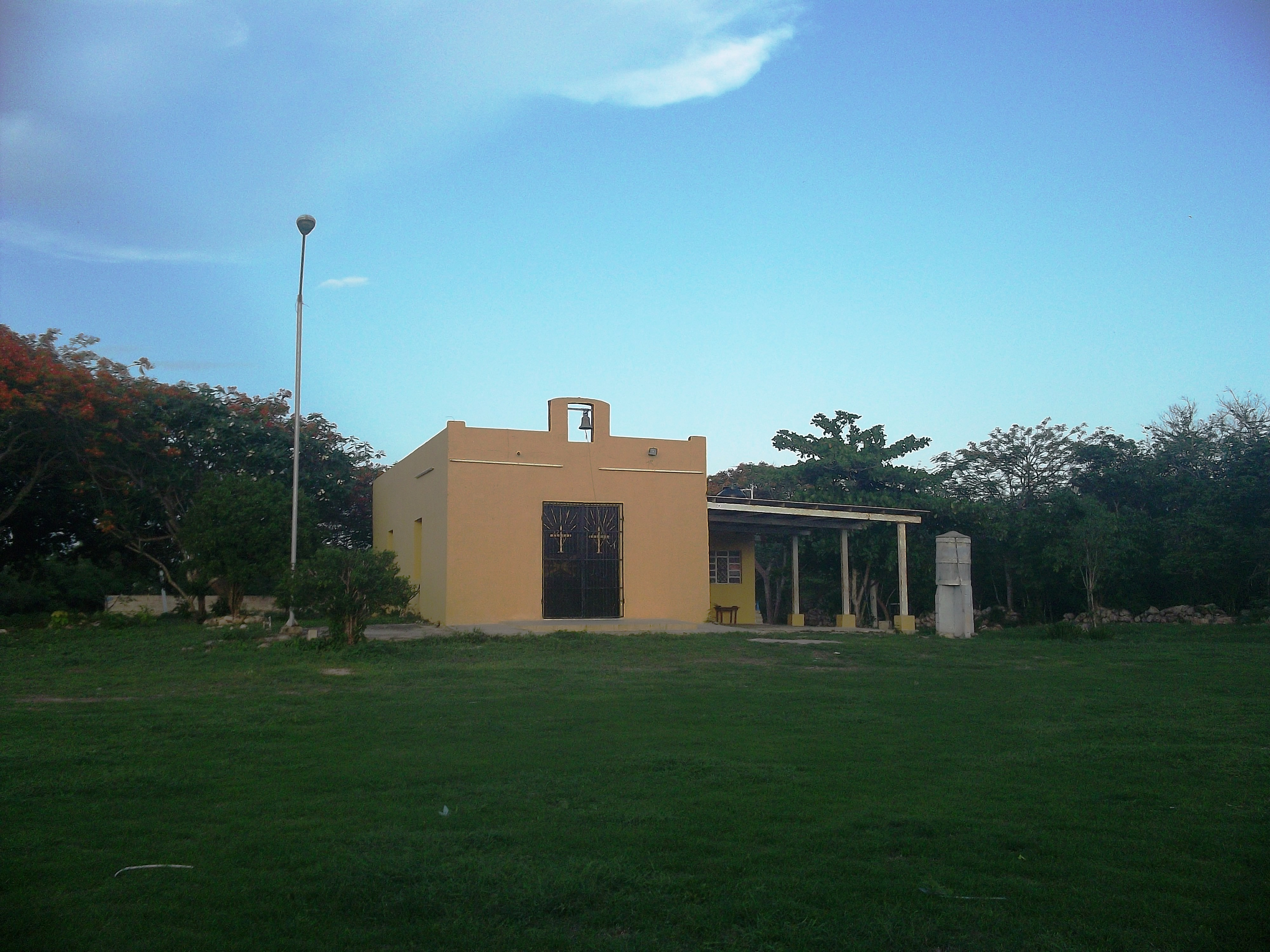
Church at Hacienda Hunxectamán

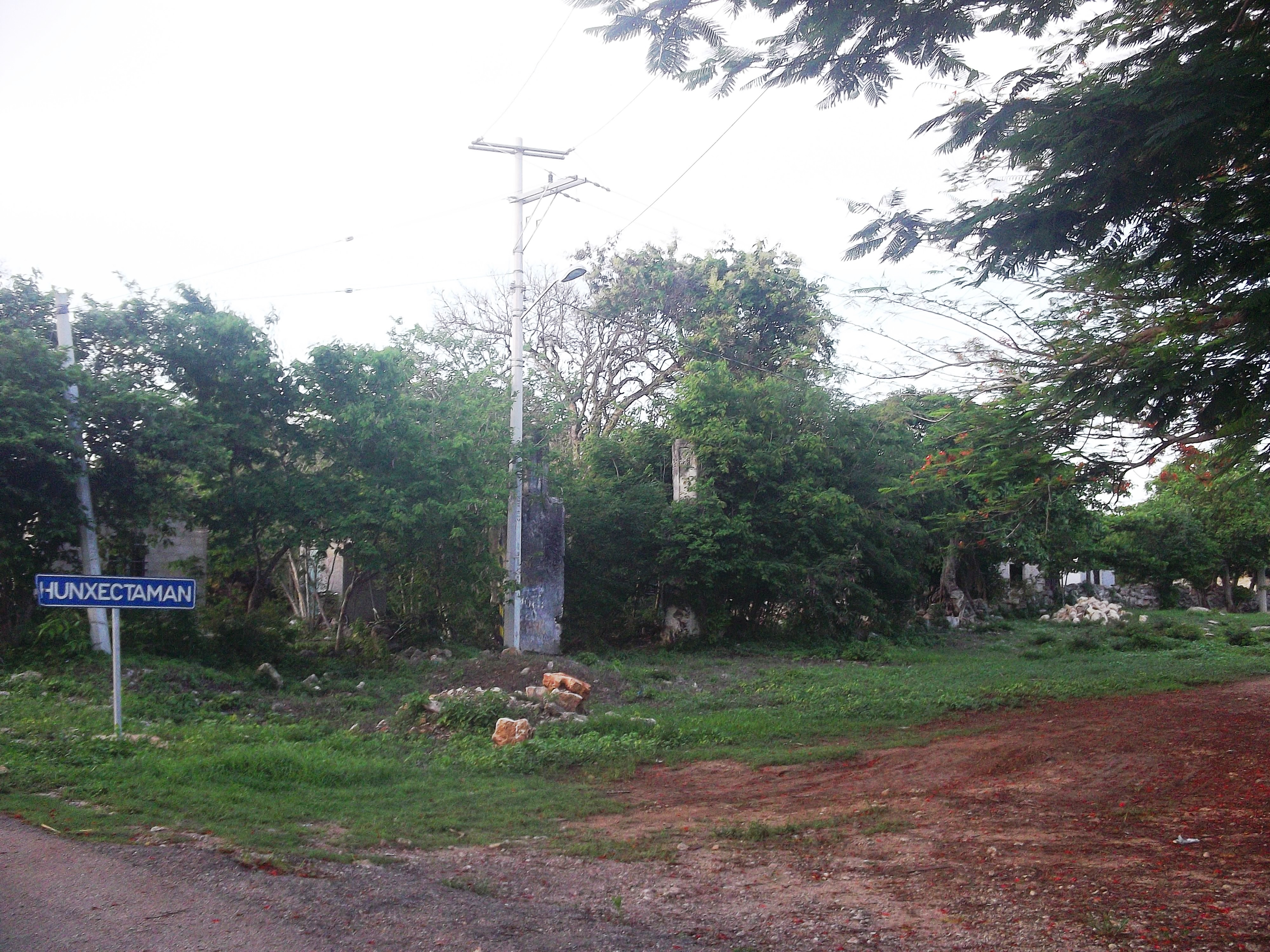
View of Hacienda Hunxectamán
