= San José Tzal =

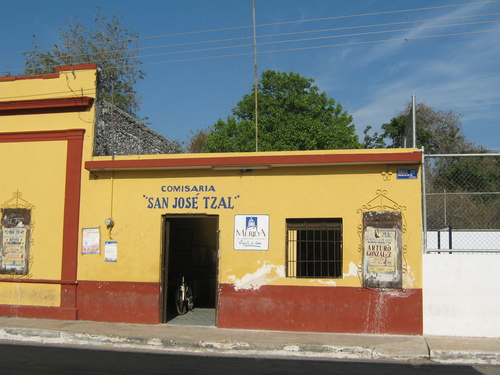

- Location within Yucatán (state)
- Coordinates: 20°49′27″N 89°39′40″W
- Country: Mexico
- State: Yucatán
- Municipality: Mérida
- Elevation: 10 m (33 ft)

Population (2010)
  - Total: 3,543

San José Tzal is a town located in the Mérida Municipality, Yucatán in Mexico.
