= Misnebalam Hacienda =

Abandoned estate in Yucatán State, Mexico

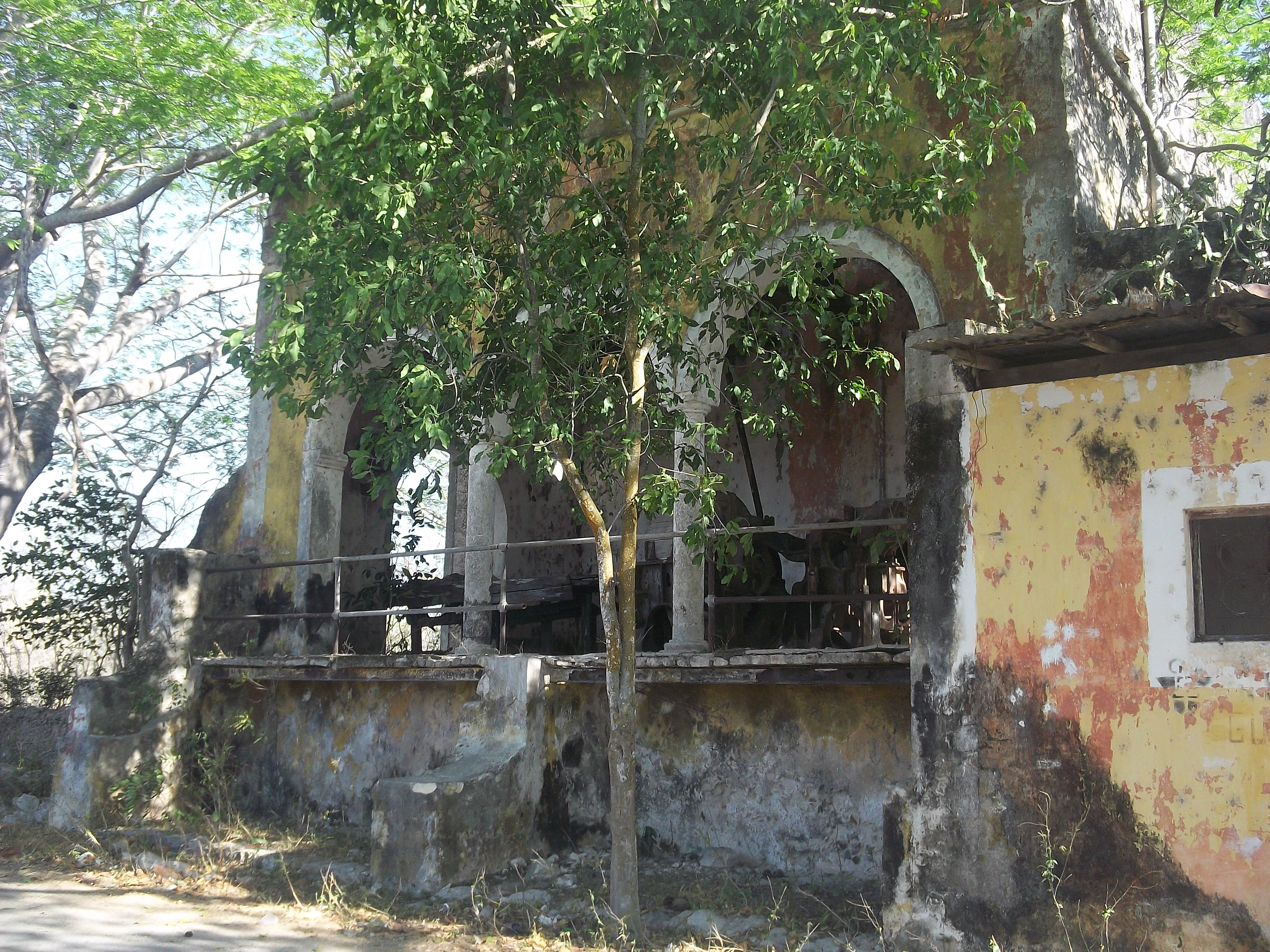
View of the Main House of the Misnebalam Hacienda.

Misnebalam (also known as Hacienda de Misnébalam) is a former hacienda of the municipality of Mérida in the Mexican state of Yucatán.

== Place names ==
The name of Misnebalam comes from "Misné", which means in the Yucatec Mayan language: Tail of cats, and "Balam" which means: Jaguar.

== Location of Misnebalam ==
Misnebalam is located at the end of a deviation at kilometer 15 of the Mérida-Progreso highway.

== Infrastructure ==
The deteriorated remains of a hacienda a reconstruction are located. The structures have been deteriorating due to the climate of the region and tree branches have grown covering entrances to buildings and abandoned houses.

== History ==
Misnébalam was founded in the early 20th century during the henequen boom in Yucatán, Mexico. At its height, the town had an estimated 170–200 residents, mostly workers of the hacienda. The economic prosperity of the settlement relied on henequen production, which eventually declined due to the advent of synthetic fibers and falling global demand. This decline led to depopulation, and by the 21st century, the town was completely abandoned. The hacienda was owned by Fidencio Gertrudis Márquez, and it issued tokens that are now of interest to numismatists.

== Demography ==
According to the 2005 census carried out by the INEGI, the population of the town was 0 inhabitants, which continues to this day.

== Gallery ==
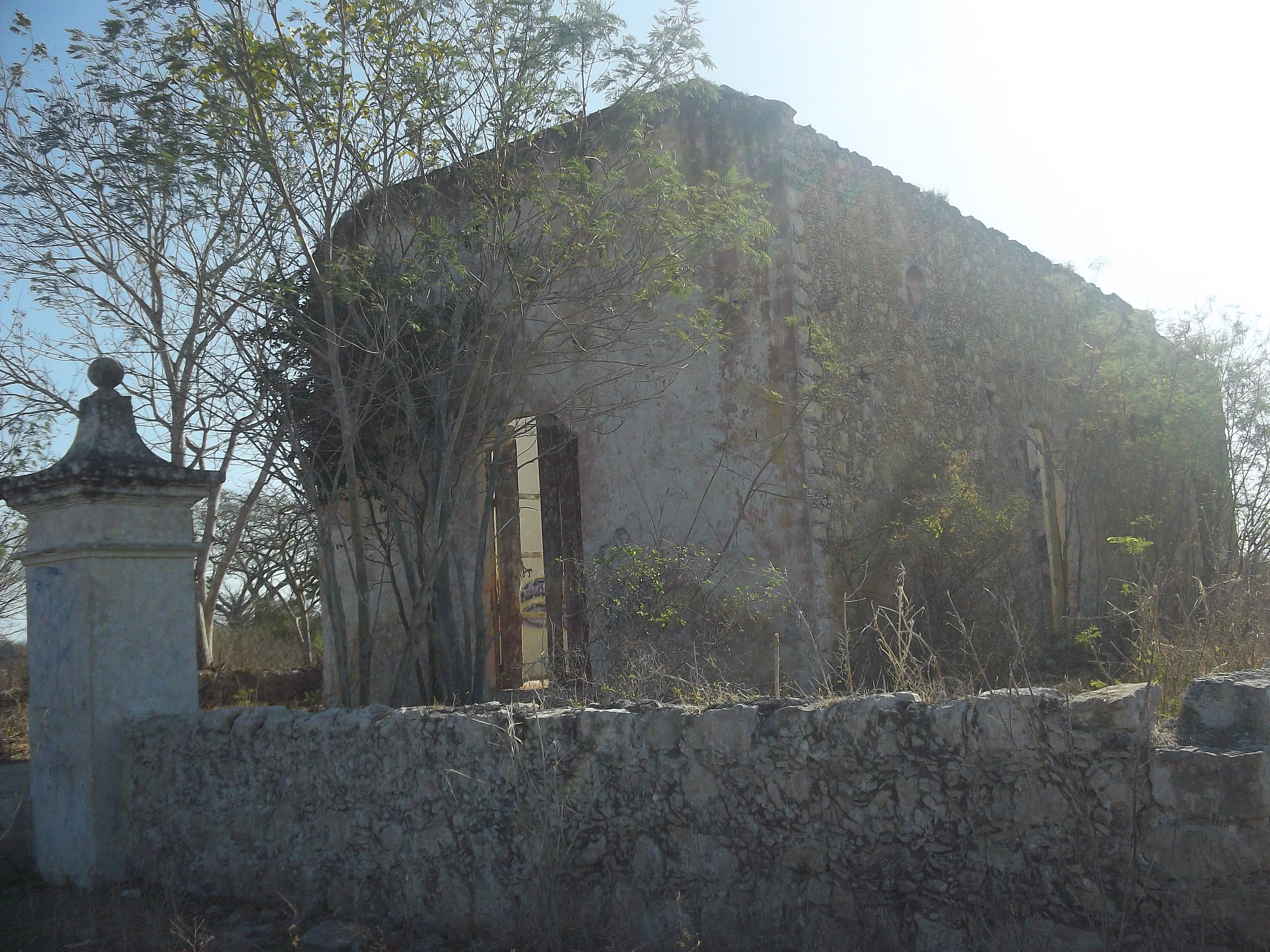
View of main church of Misnebalam.

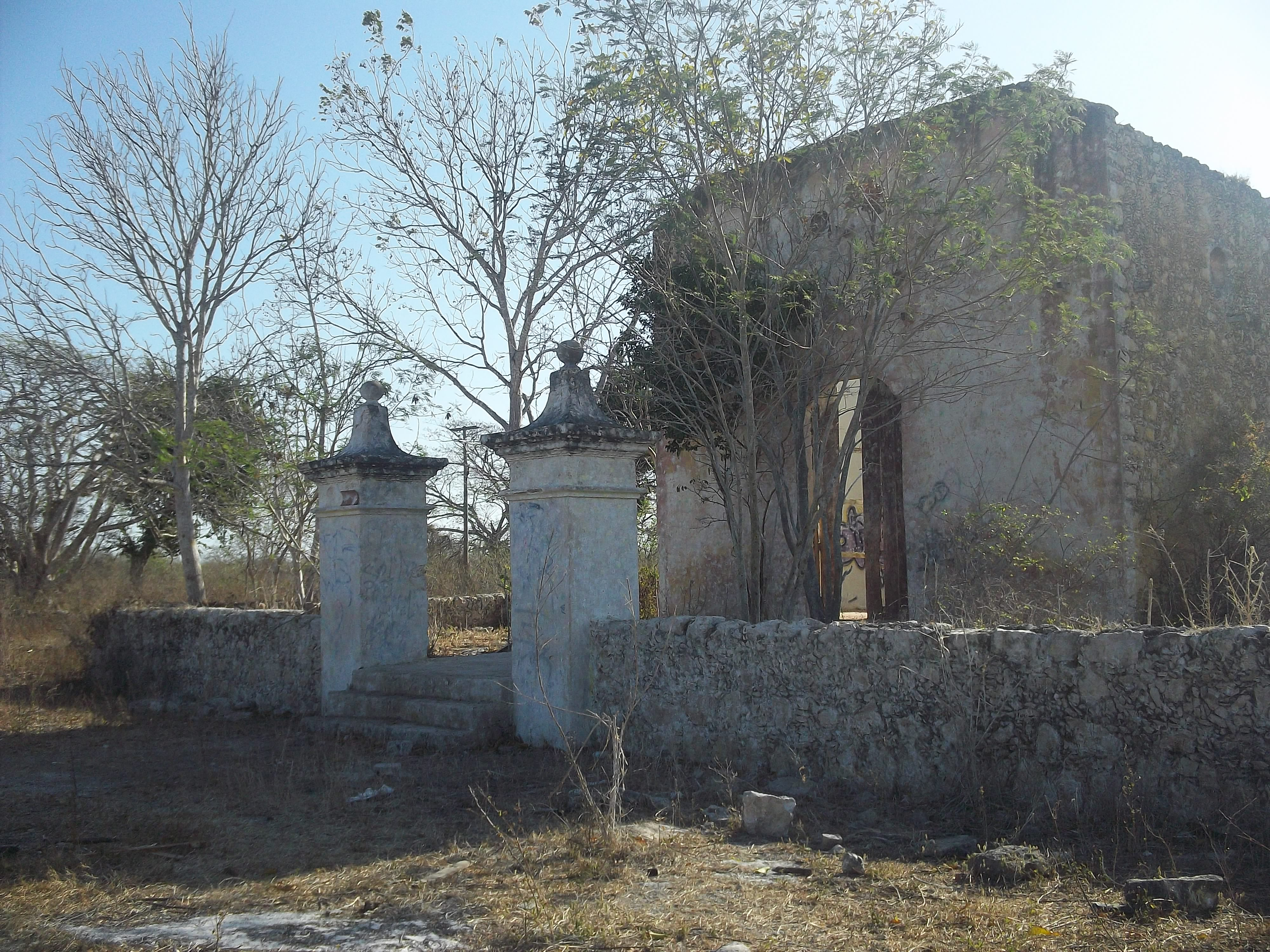
Other view of church.

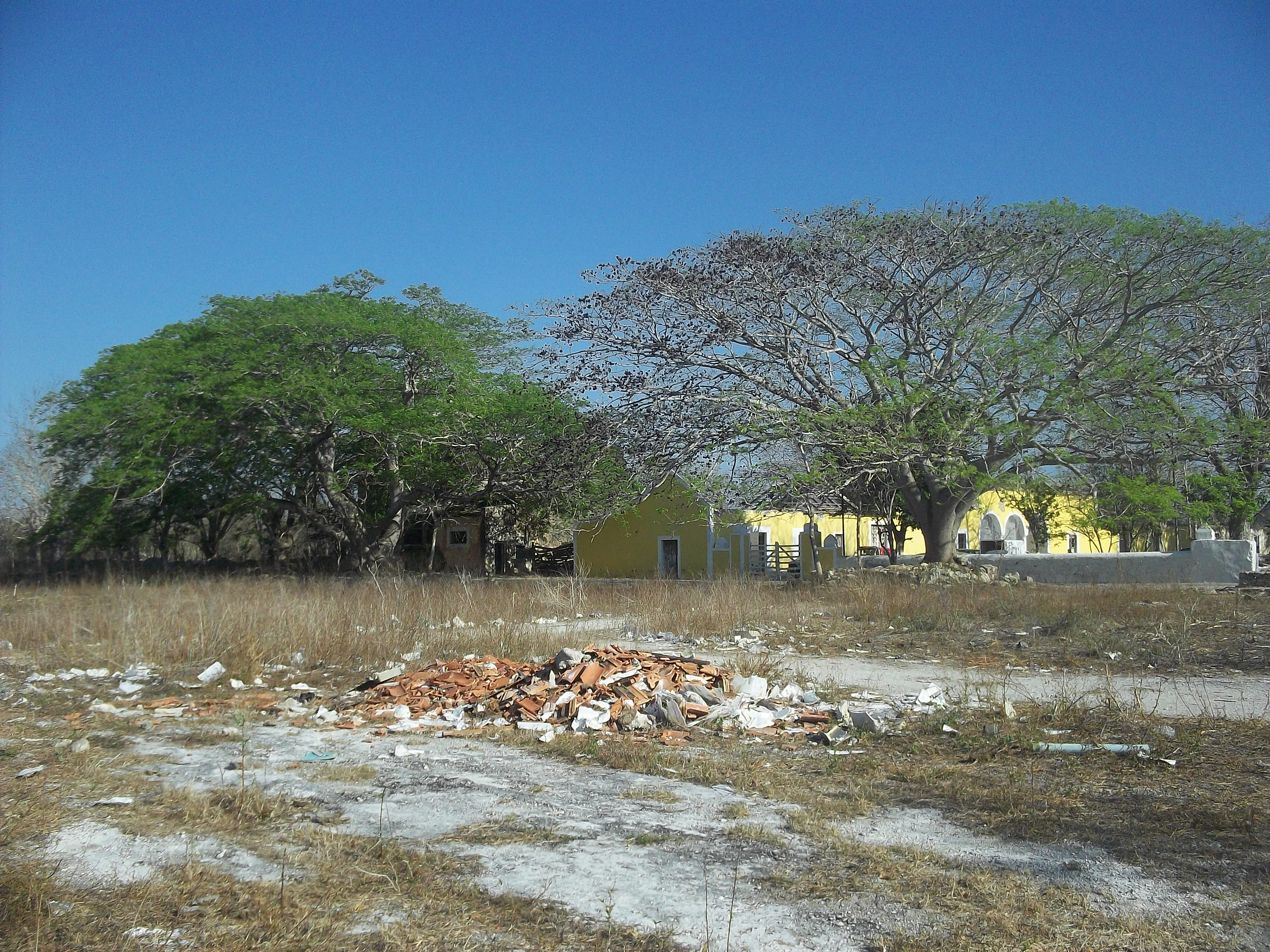
View of Misnebalam Hacienda.

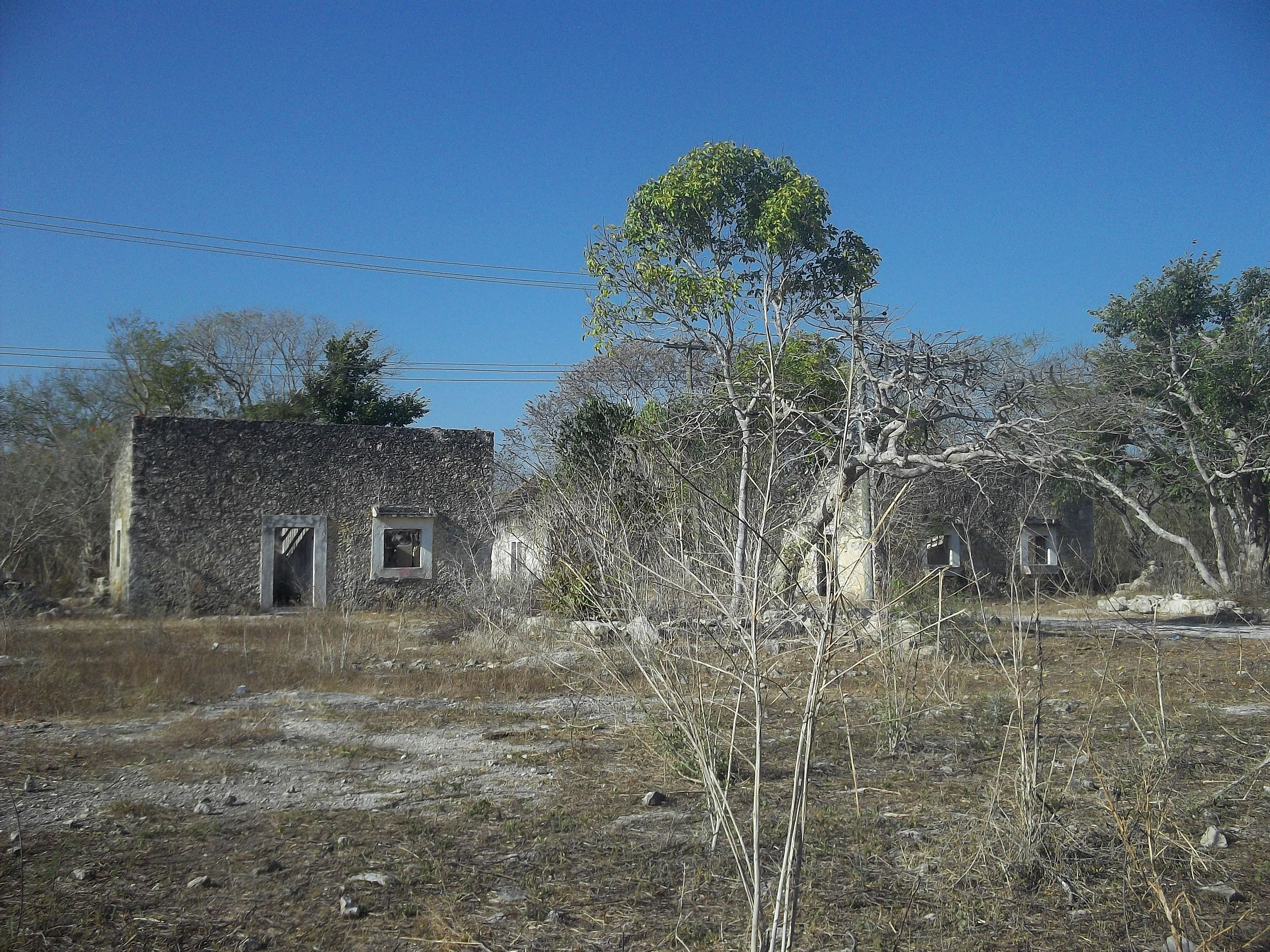

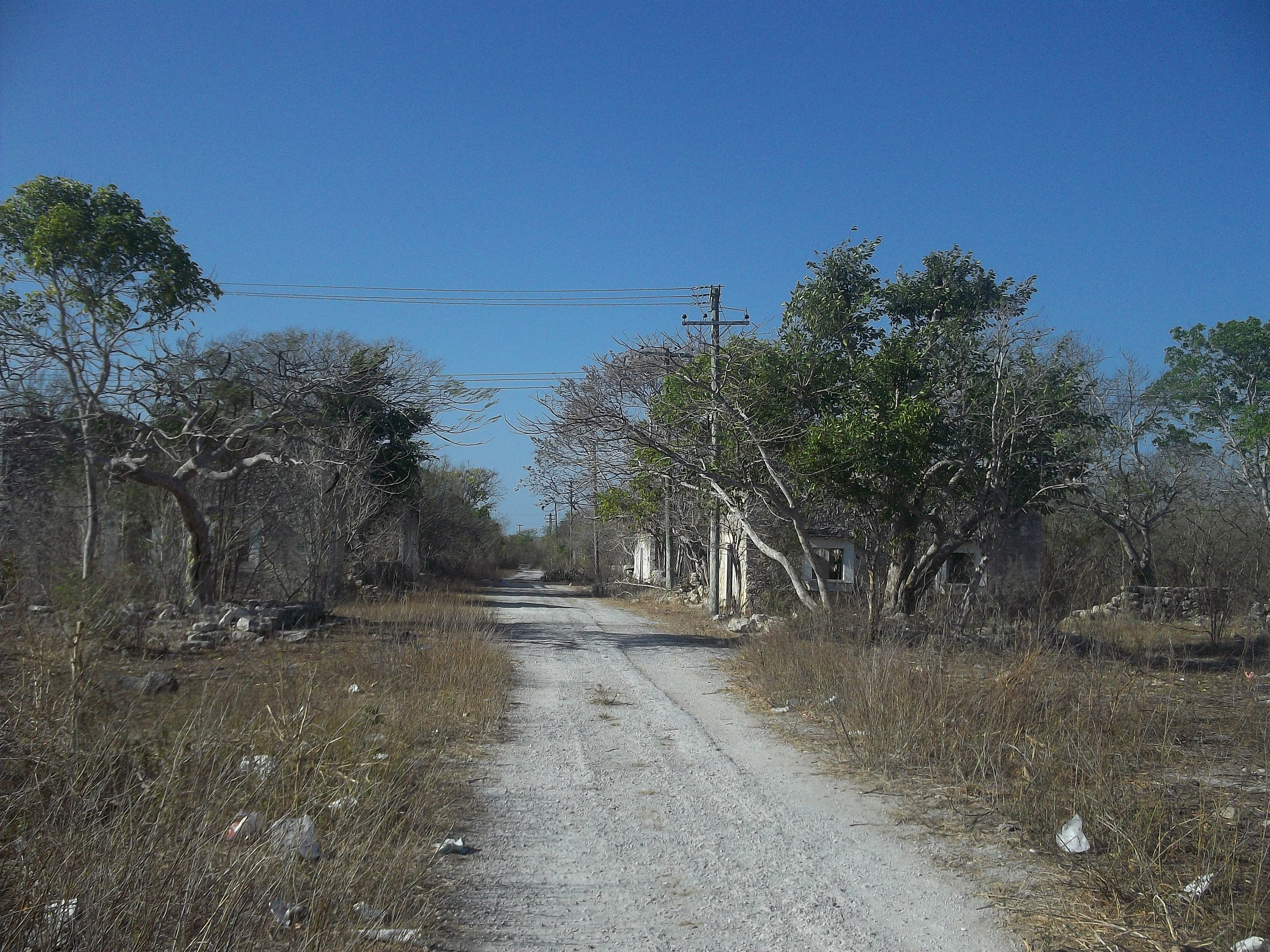

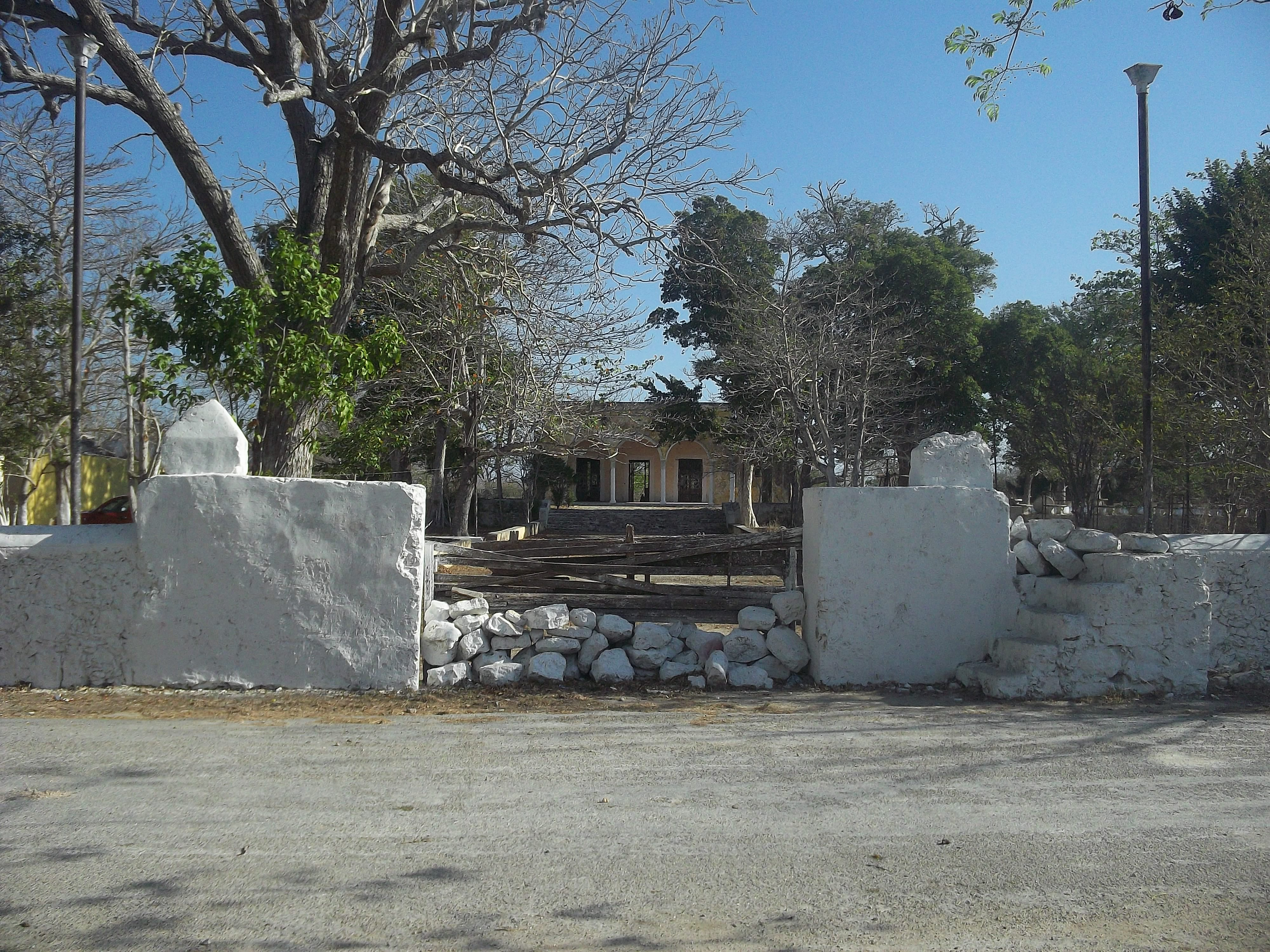

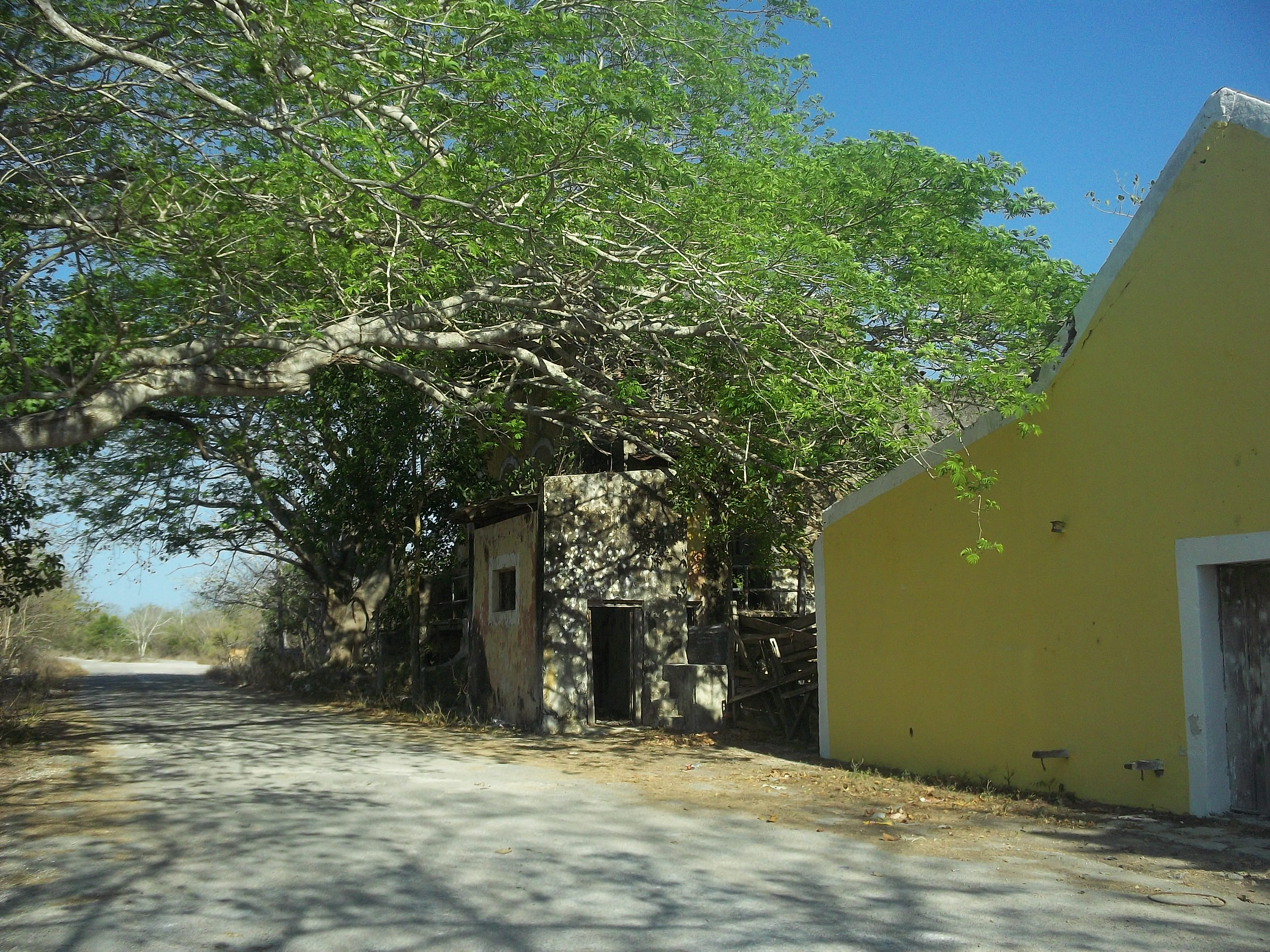

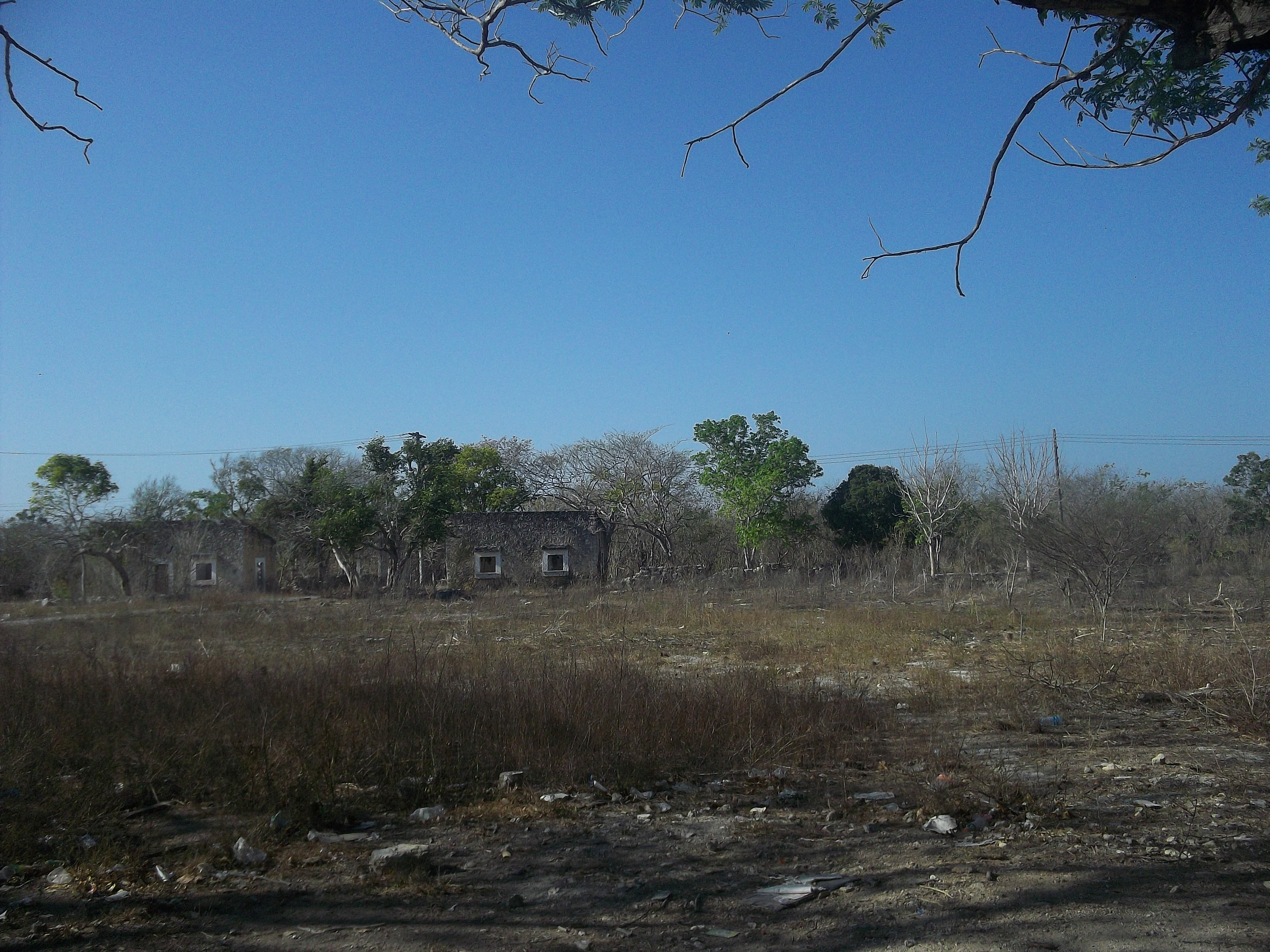

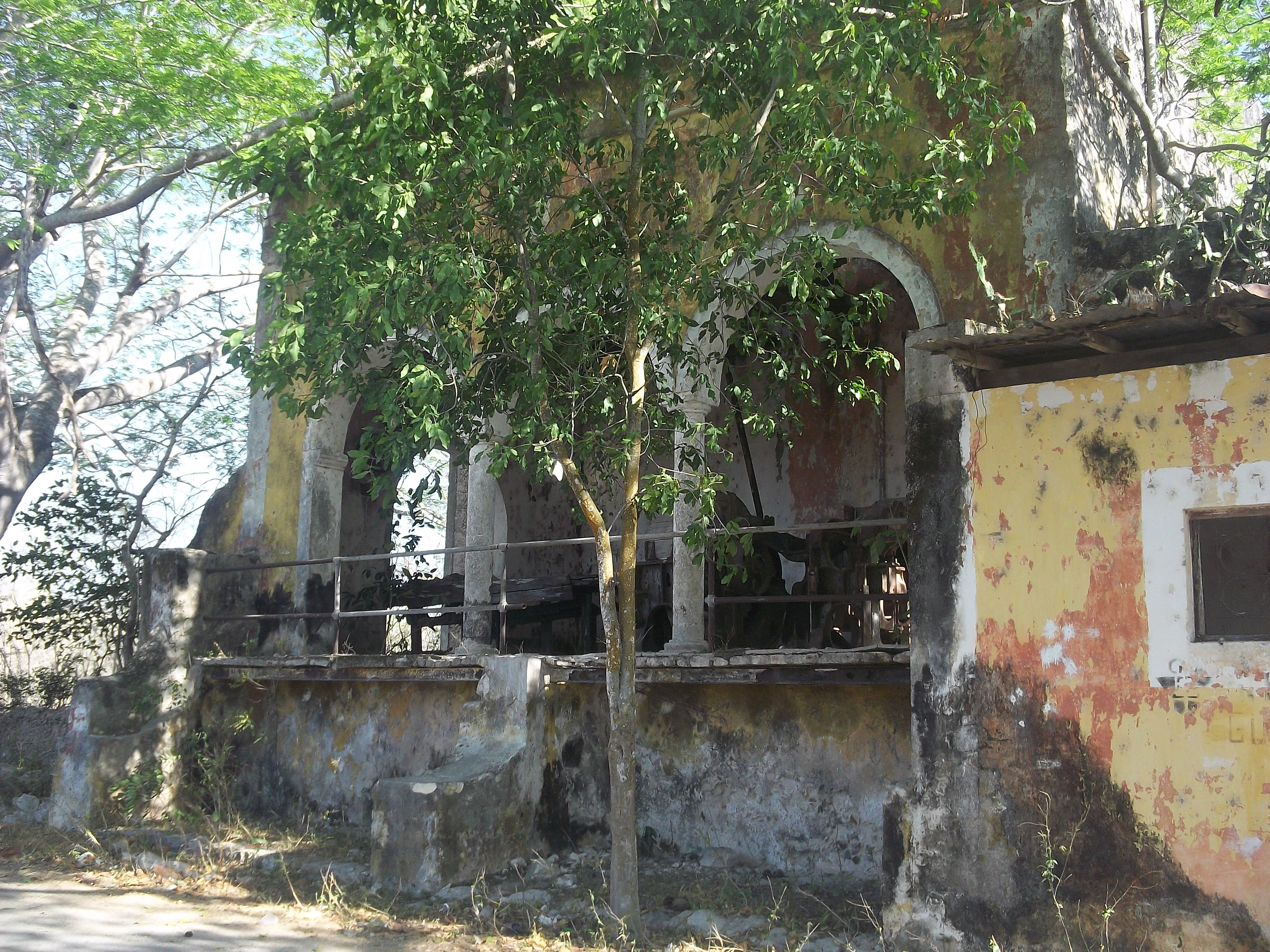

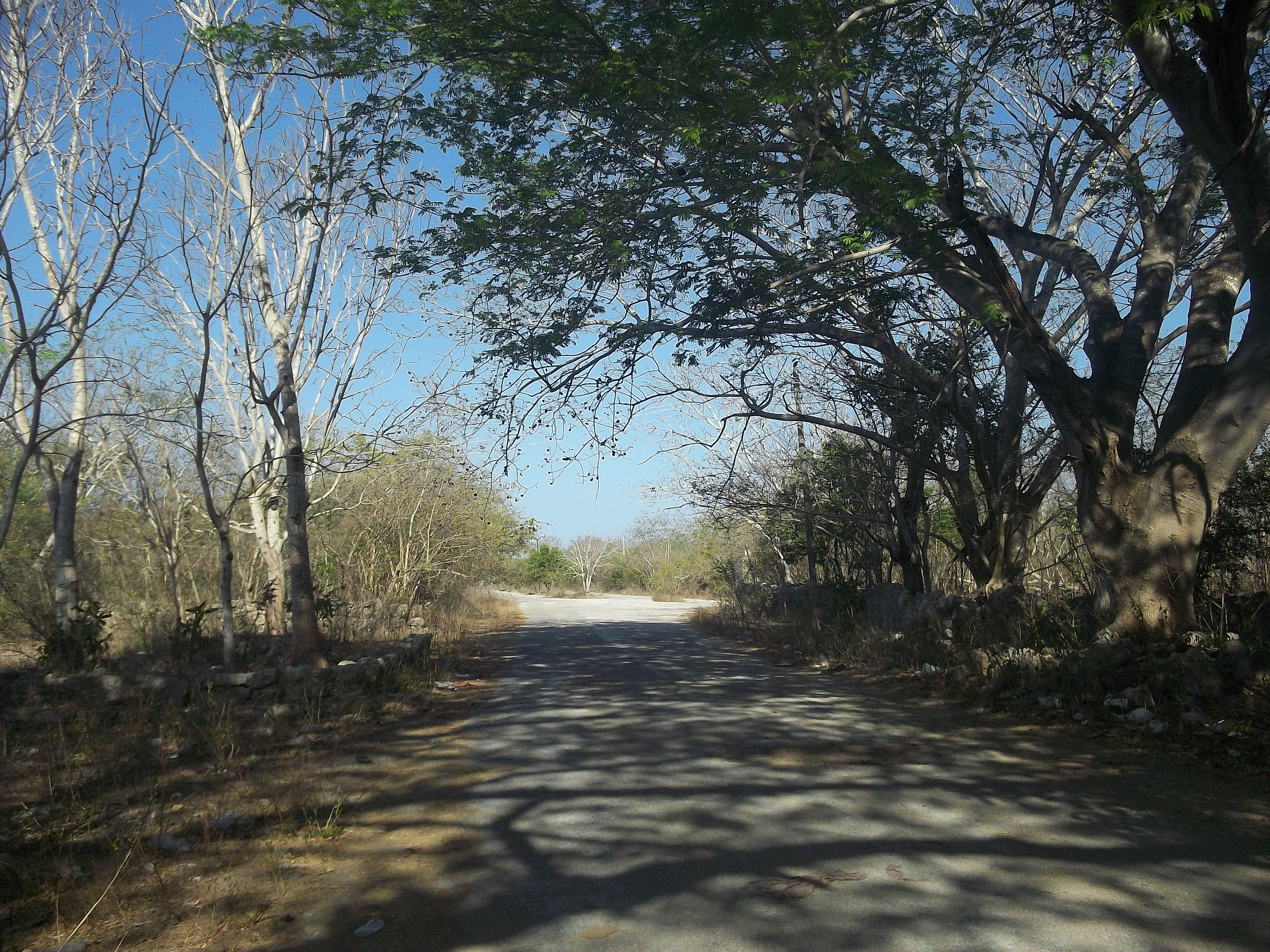

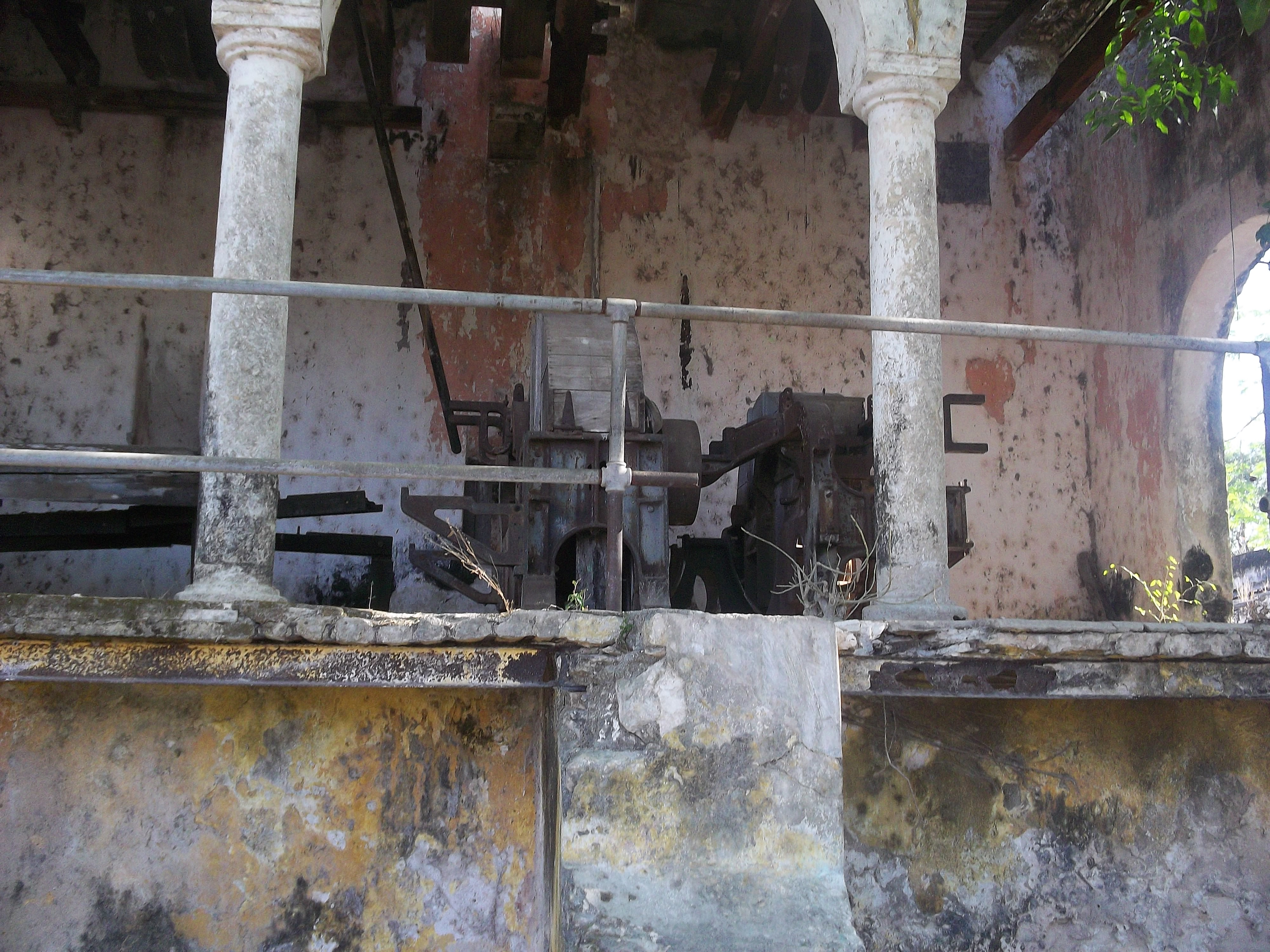
Old machinery of the Hacienda.

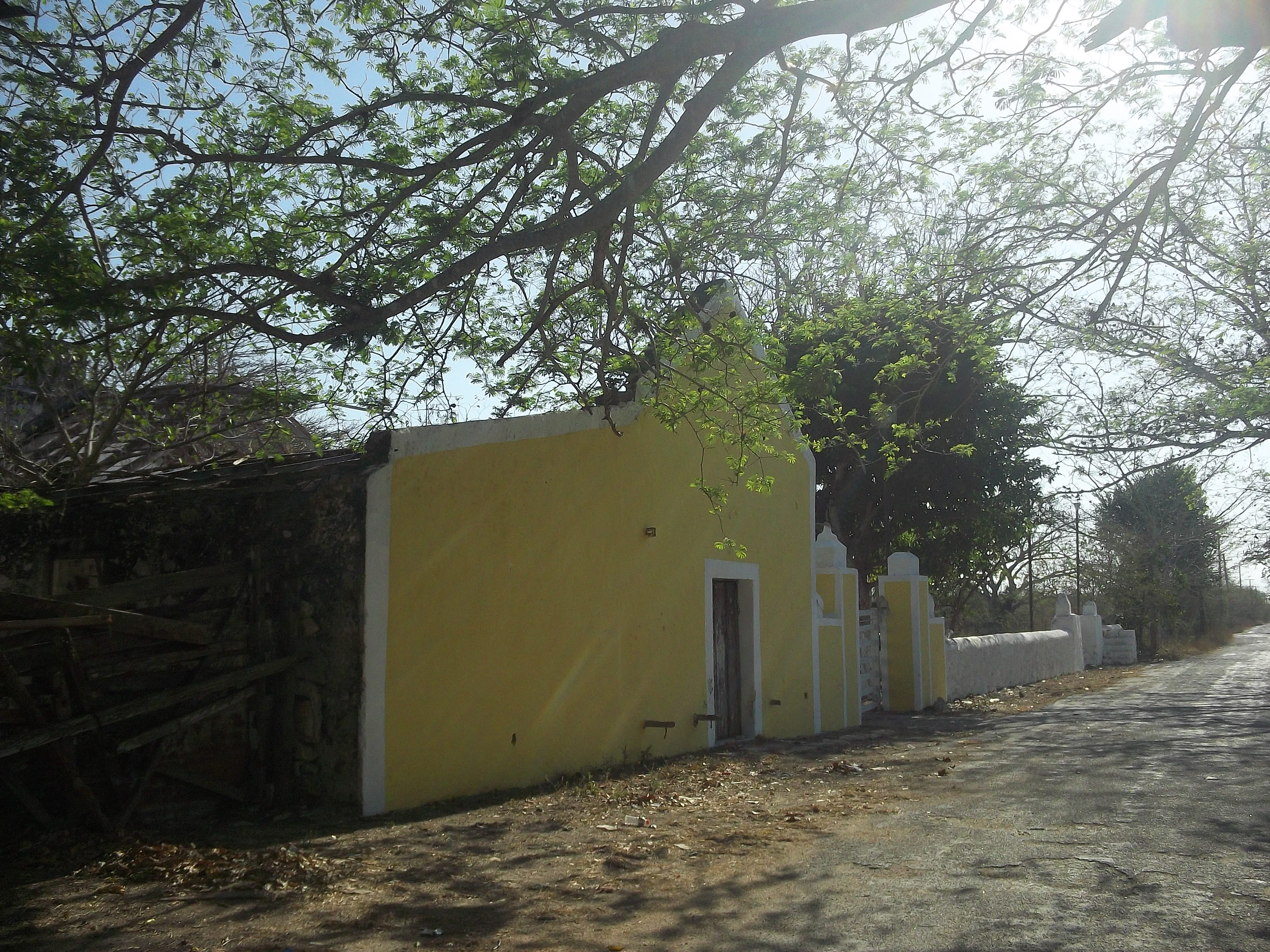

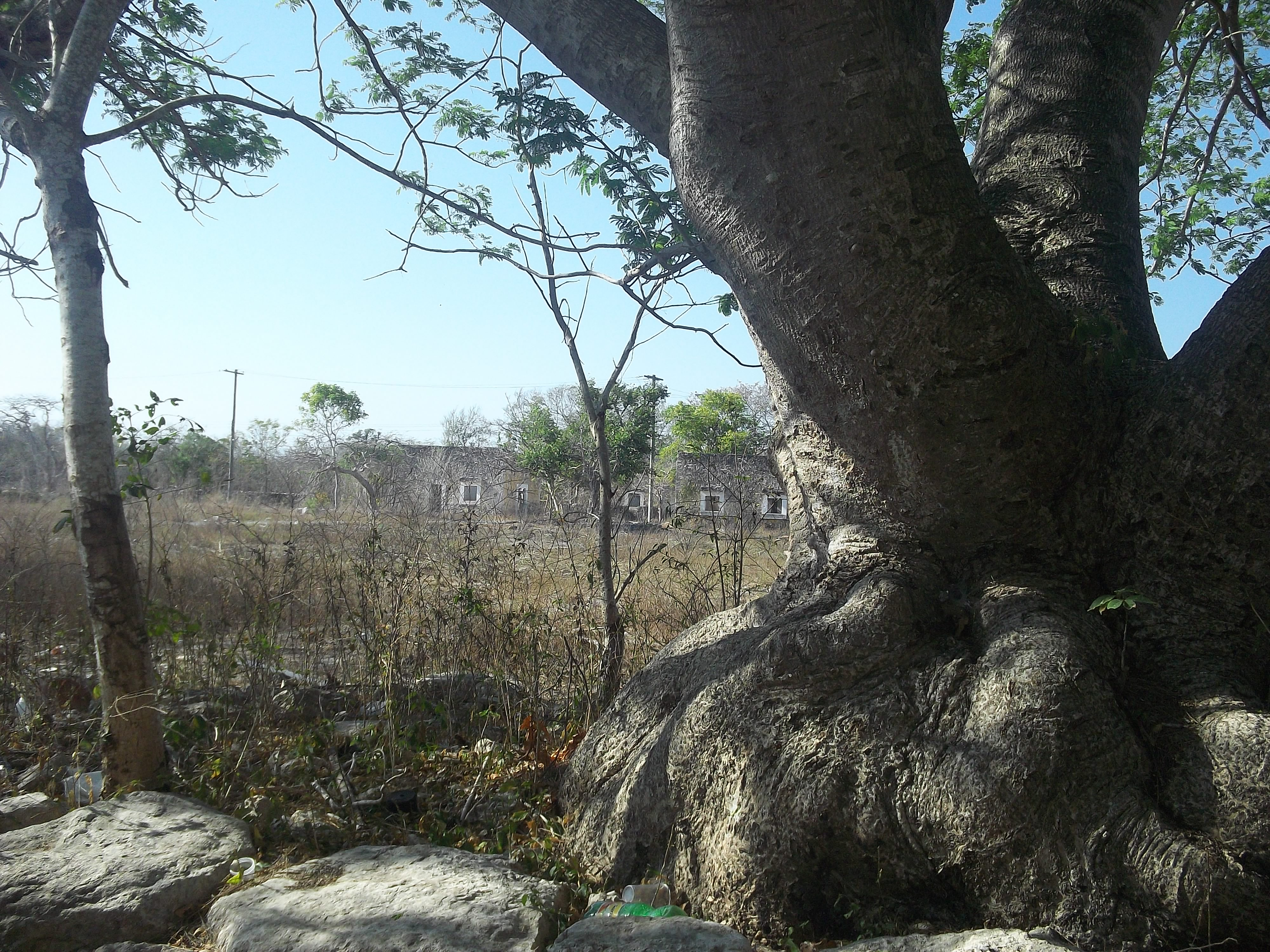

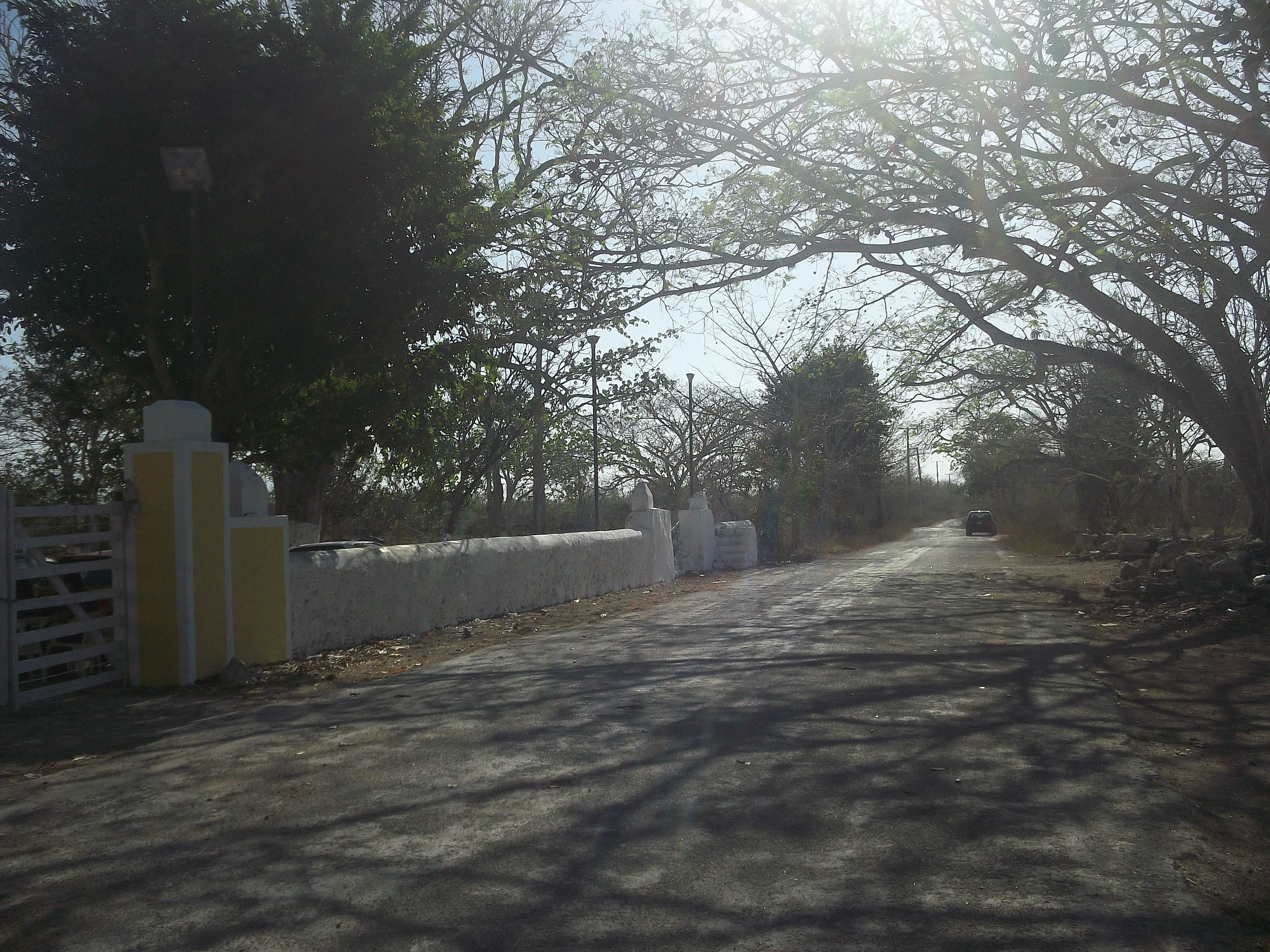

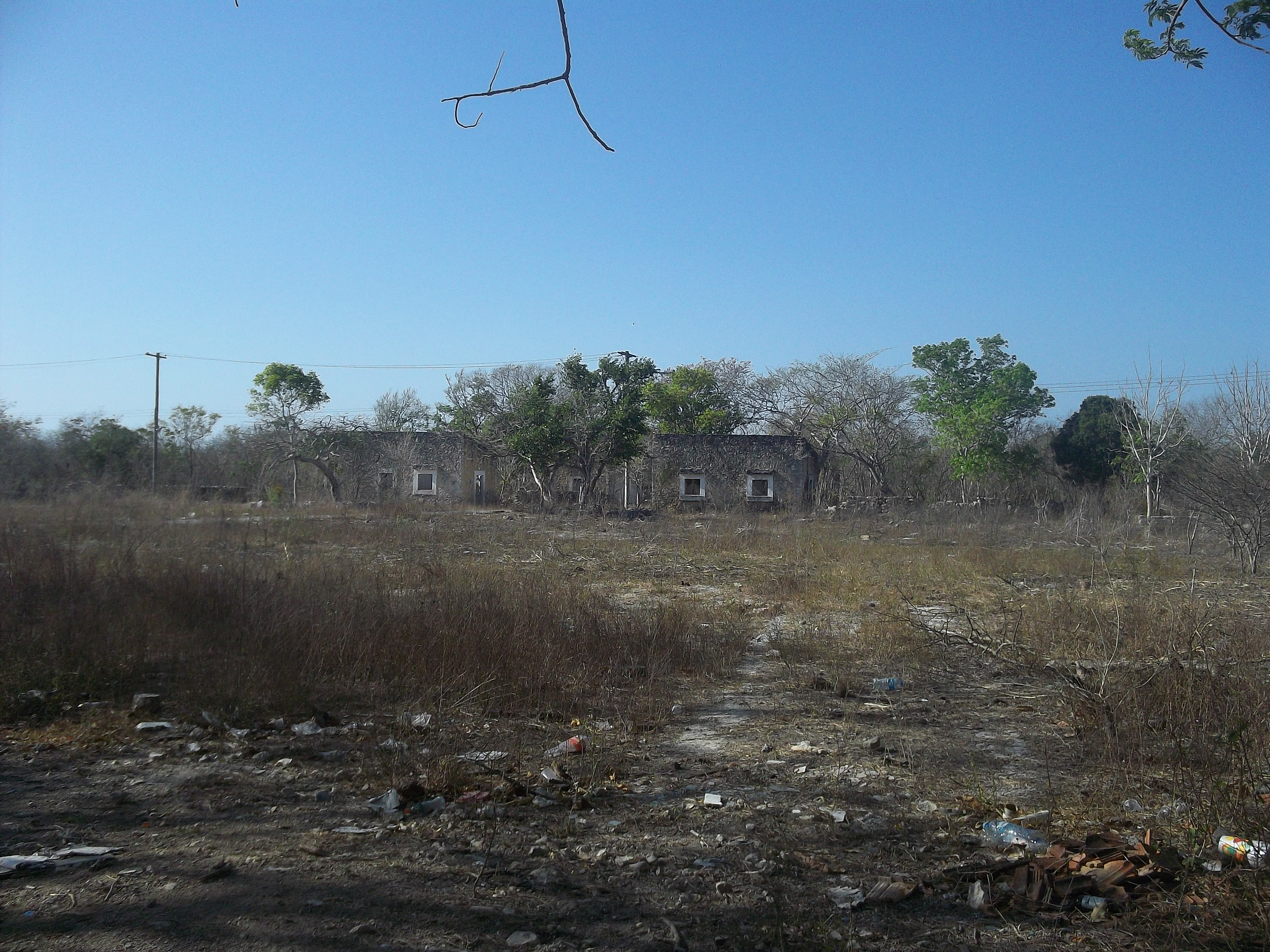

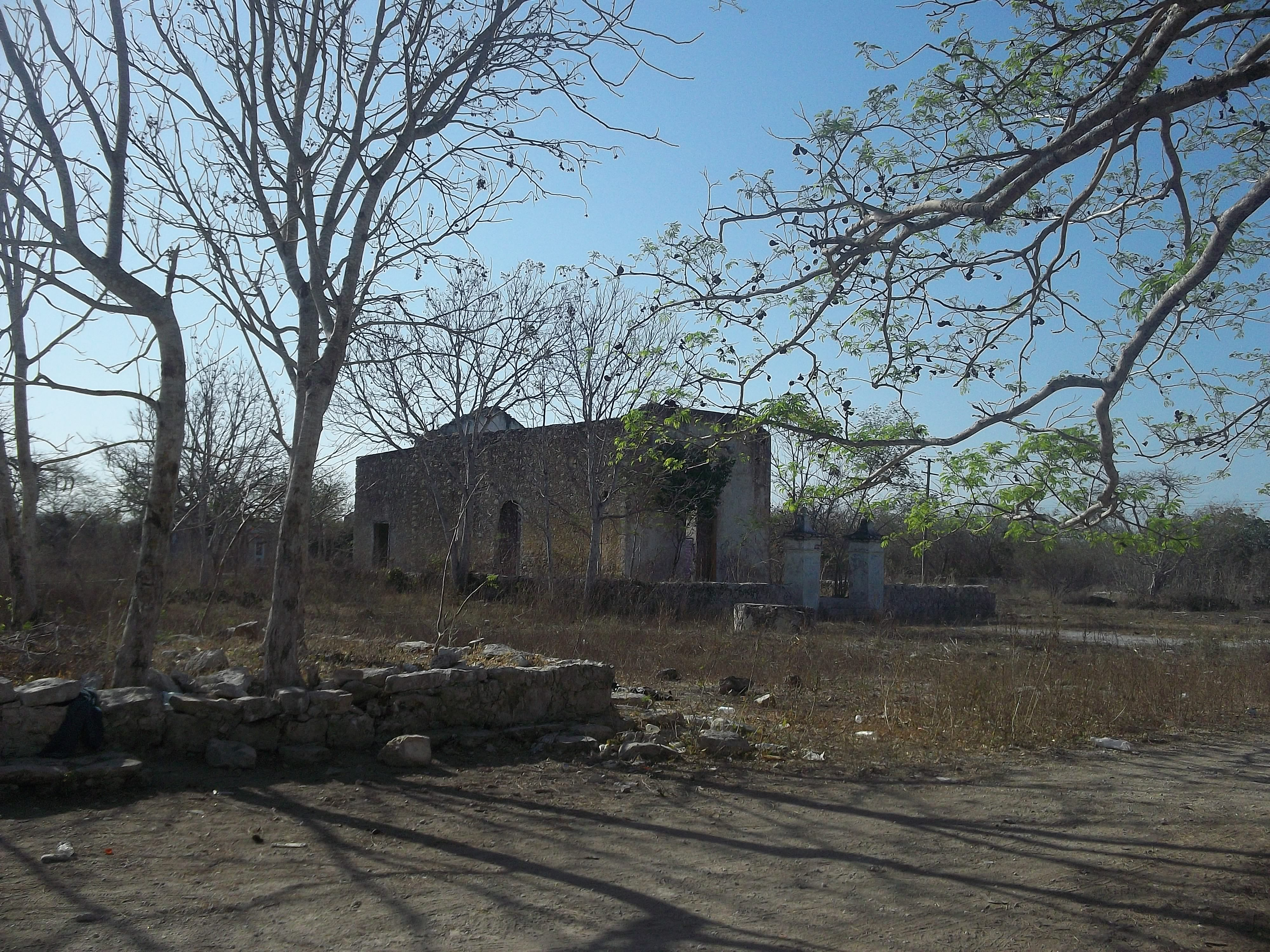

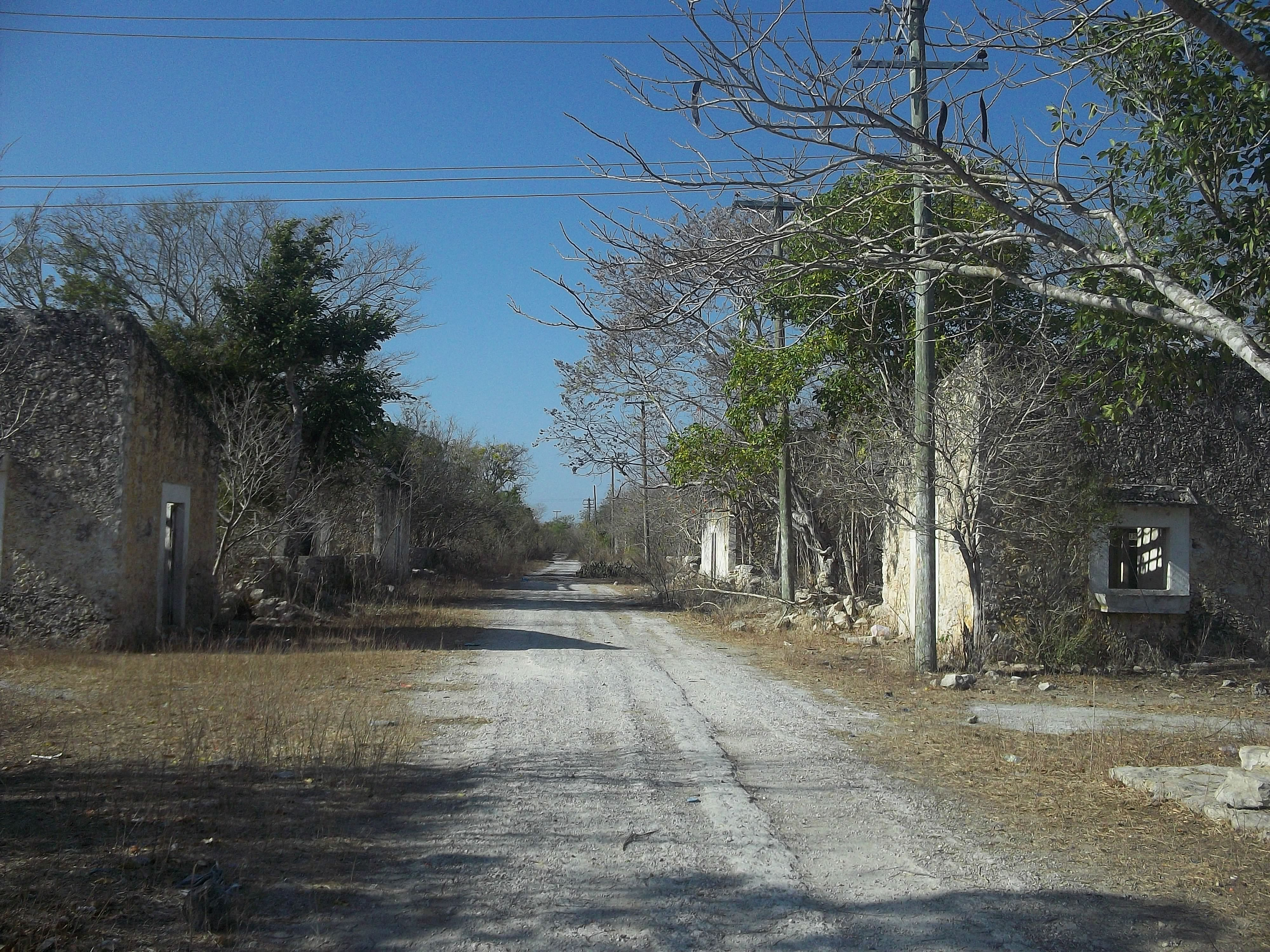
Main Street of Misnebalam.

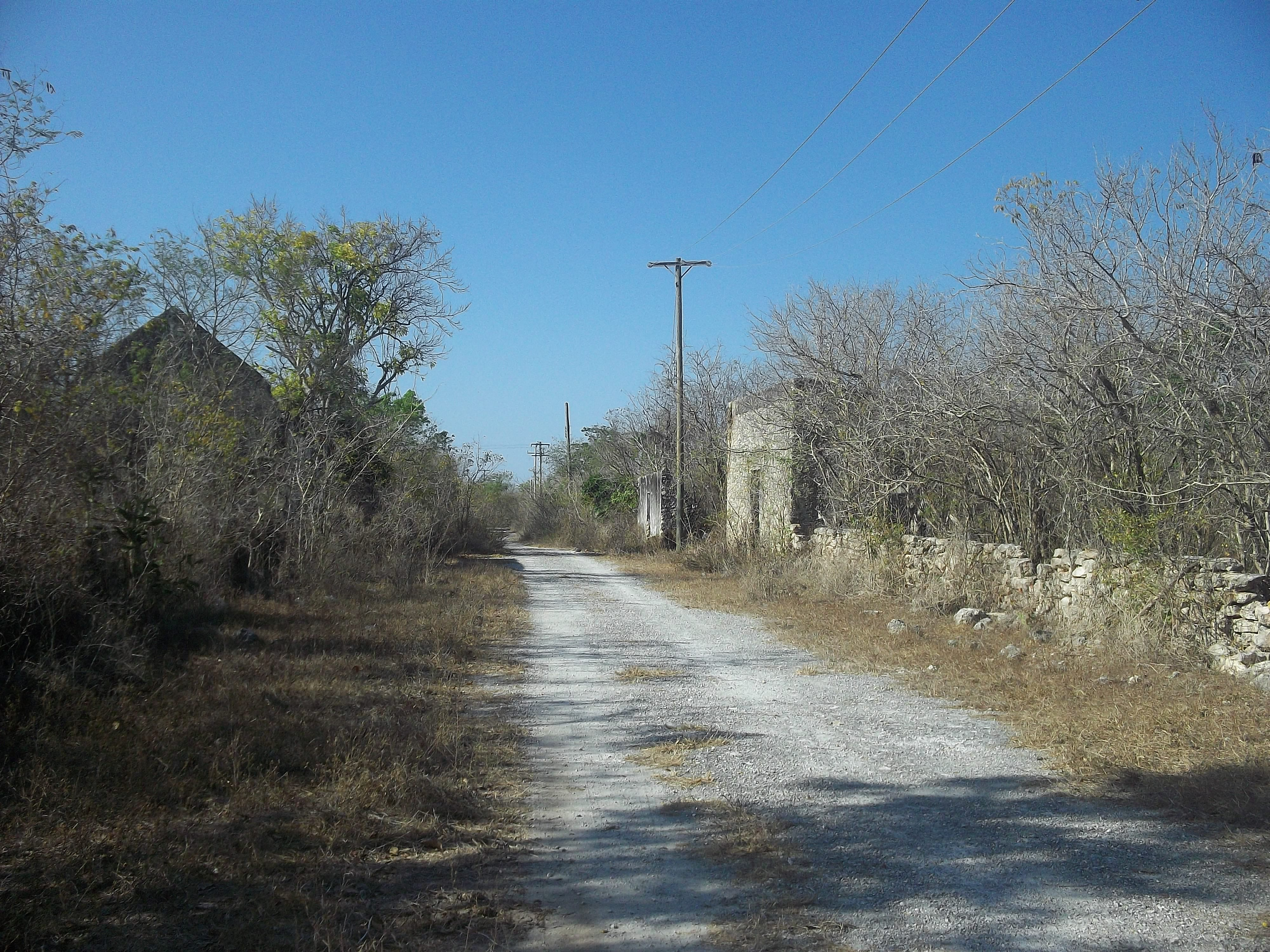

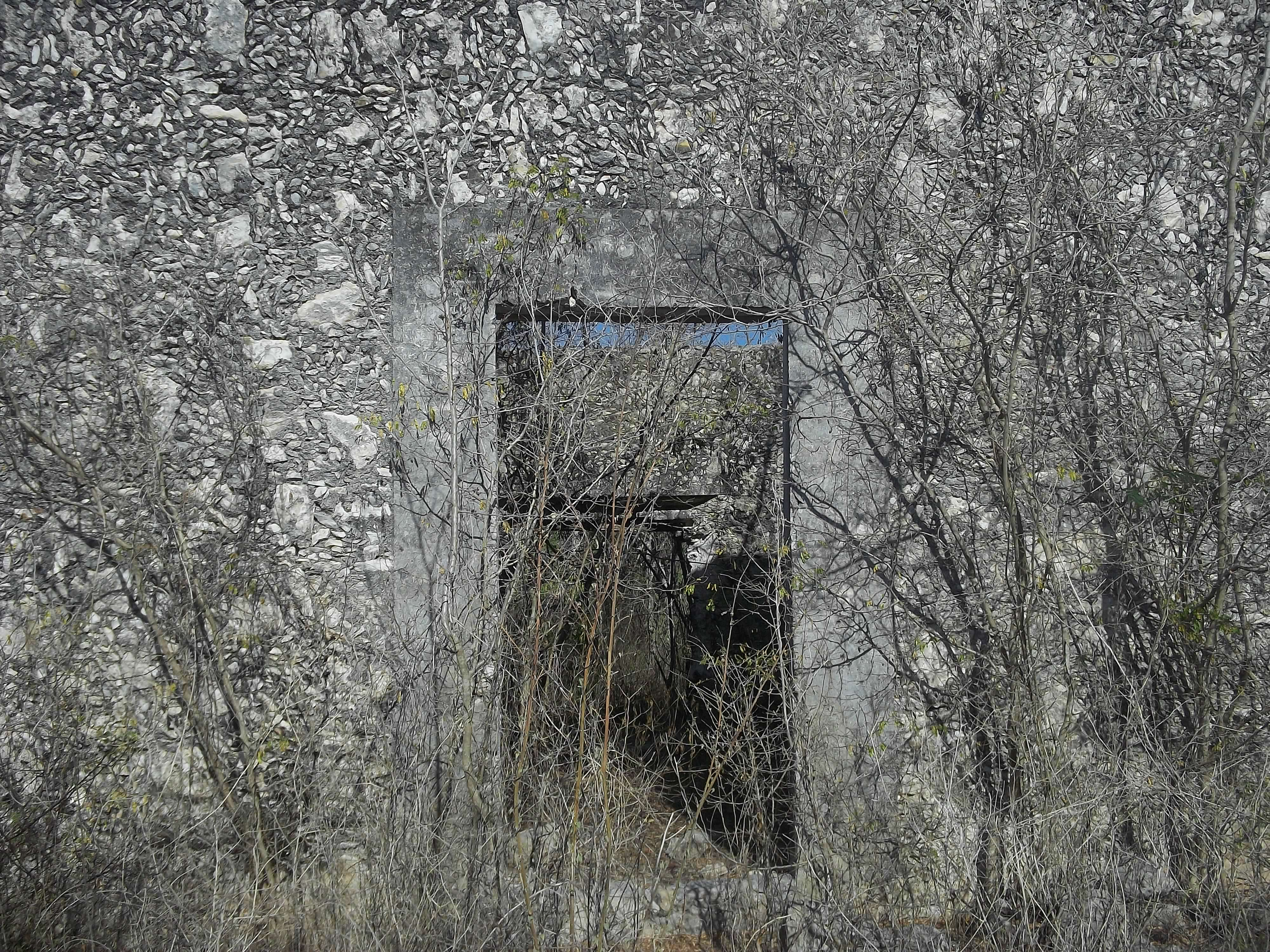

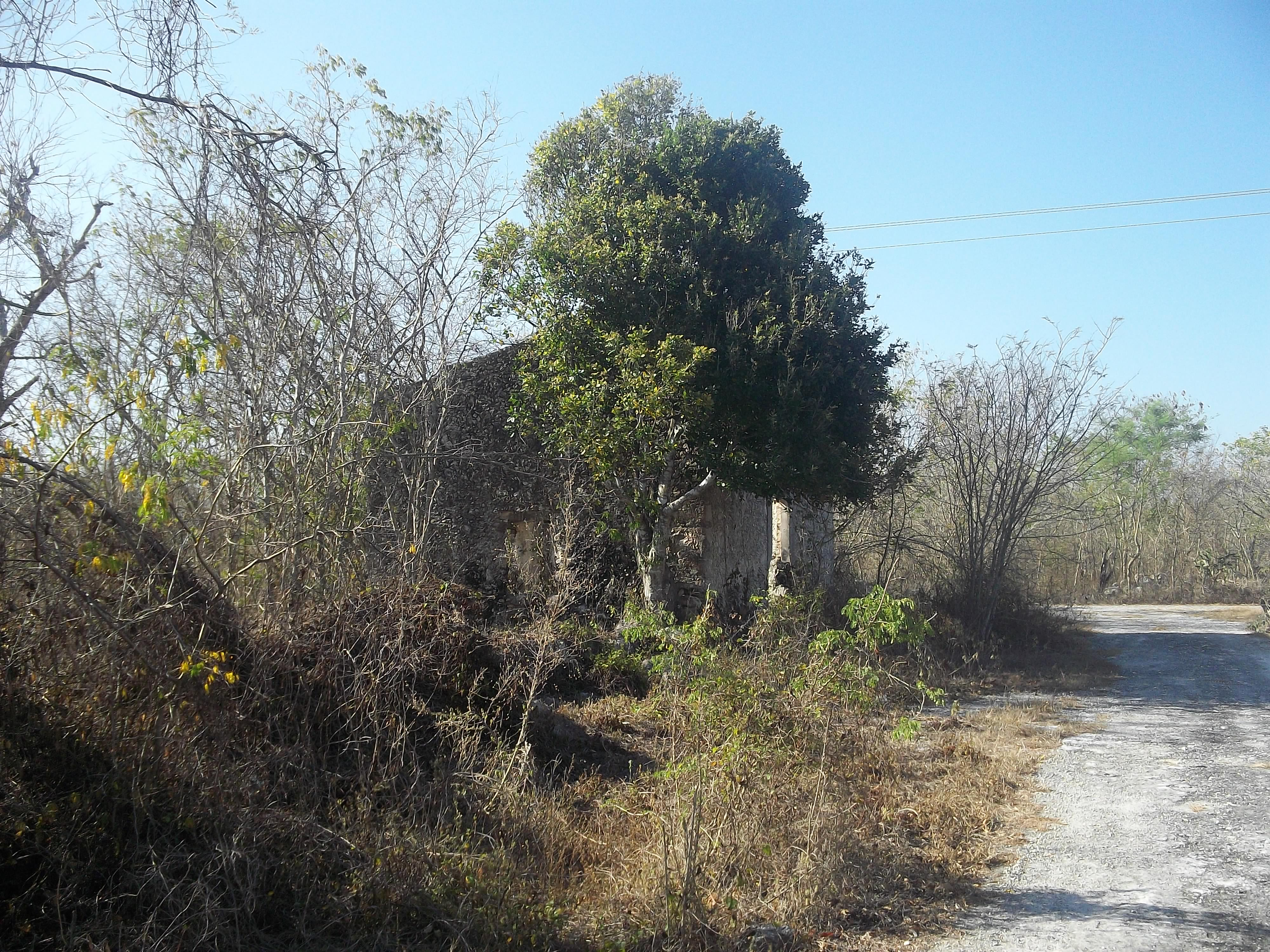

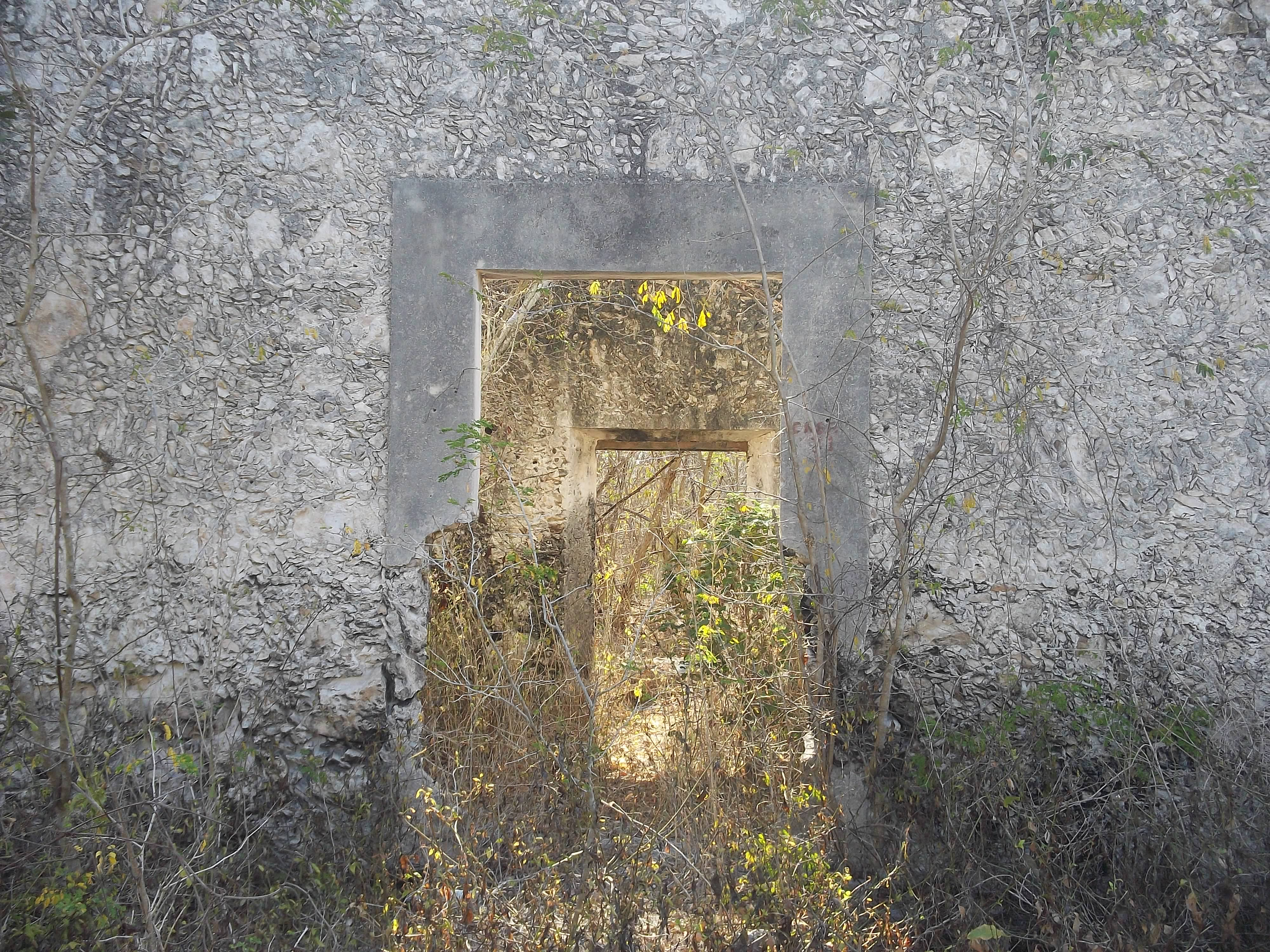

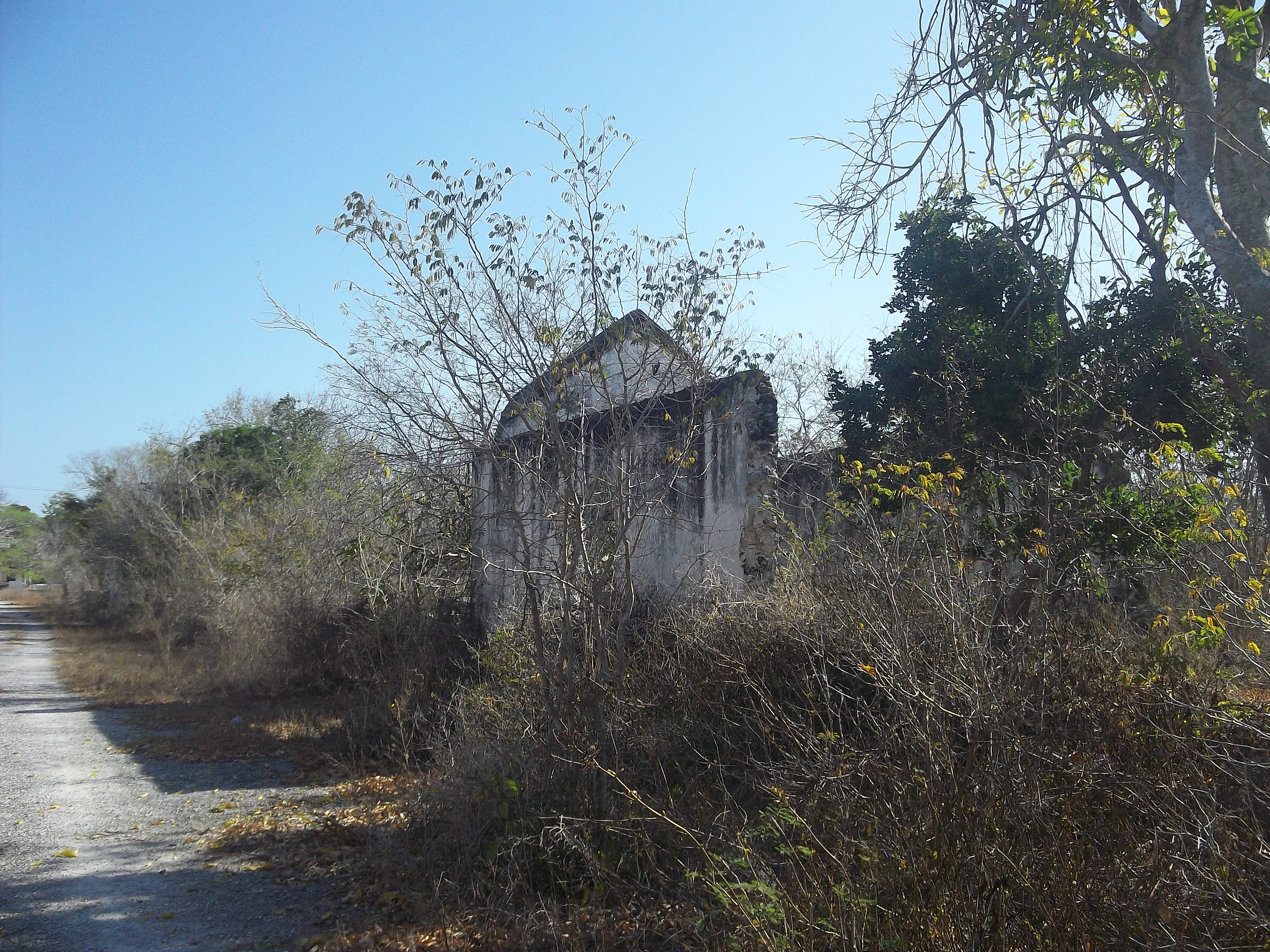

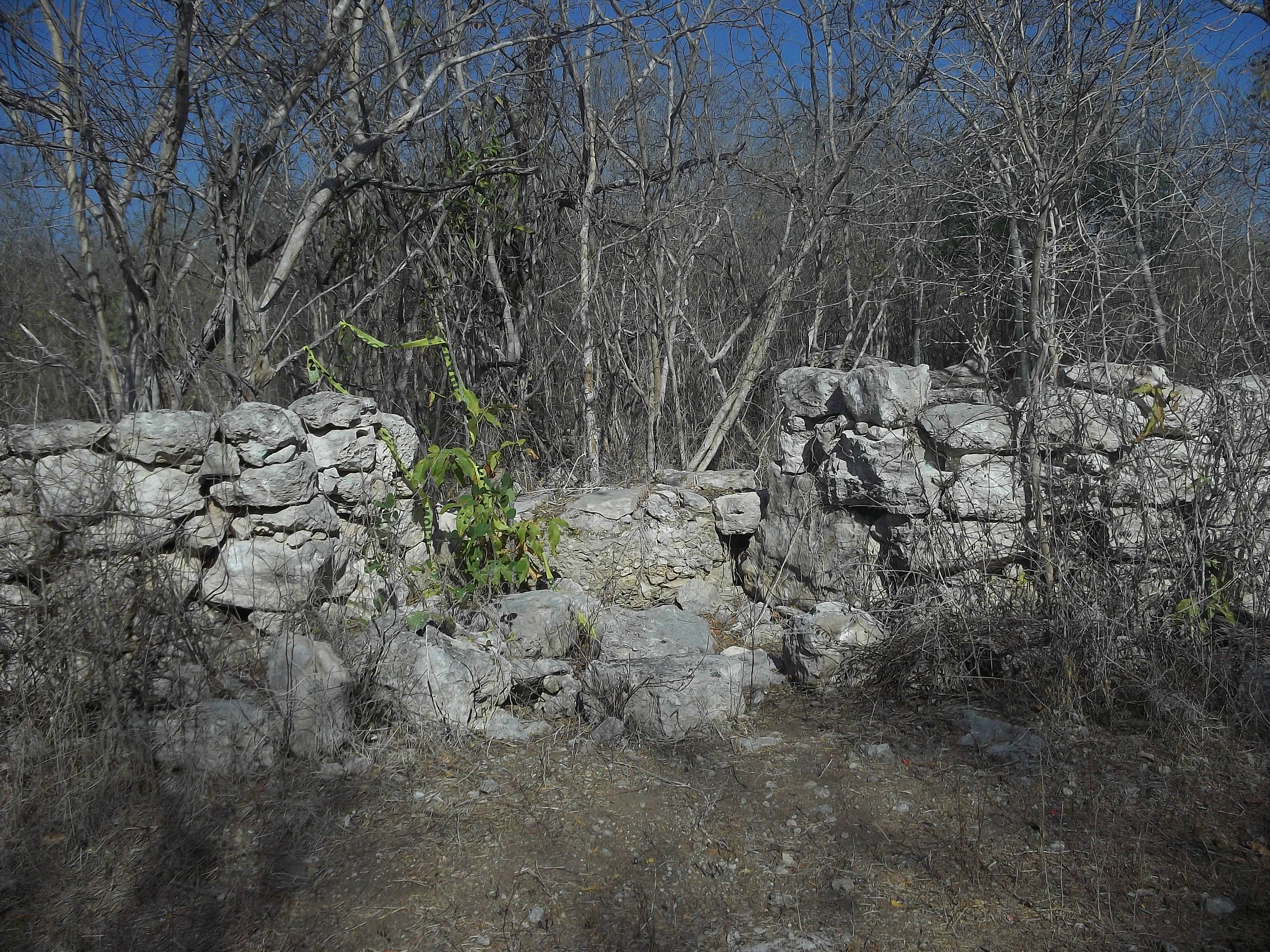

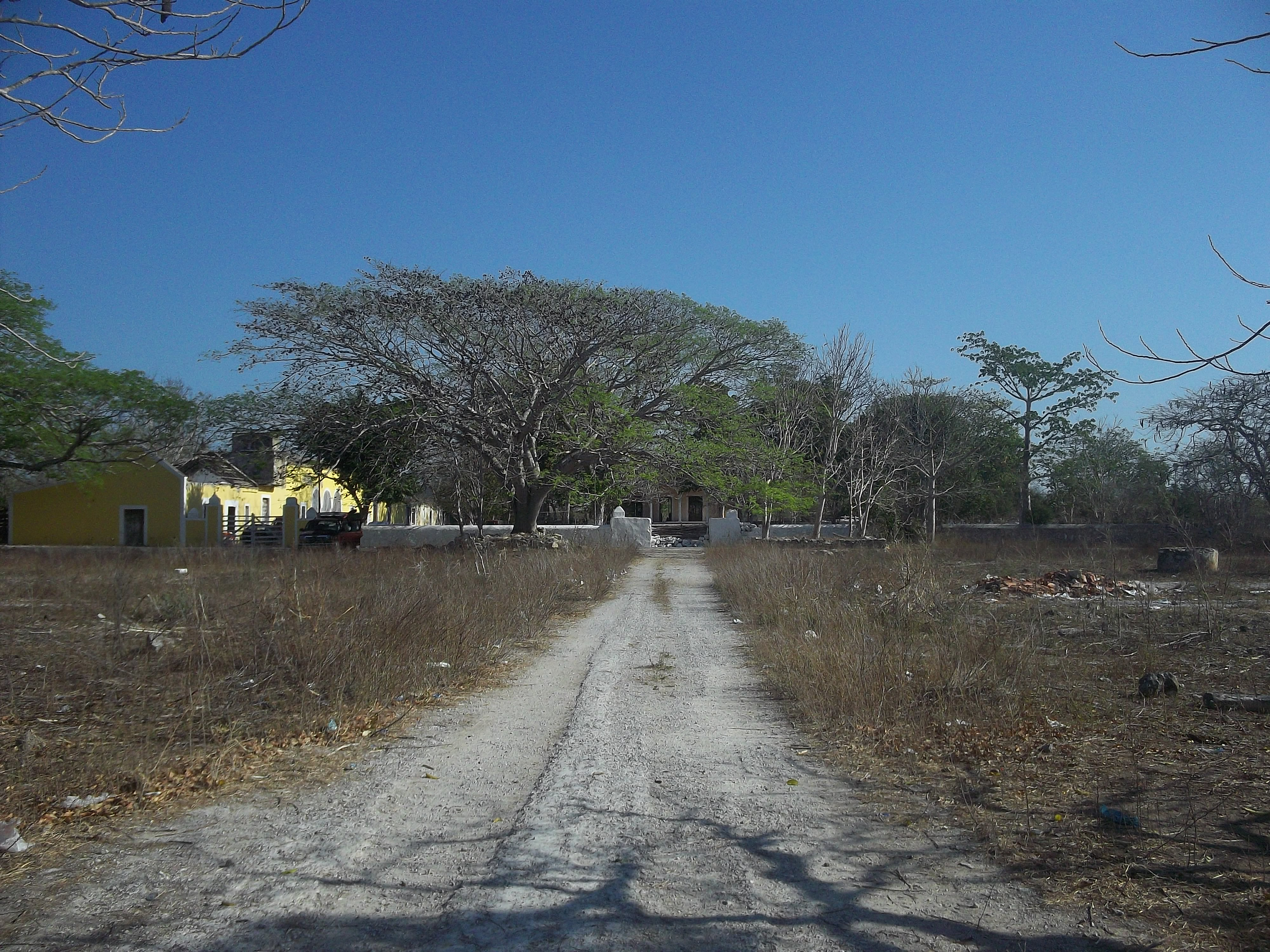

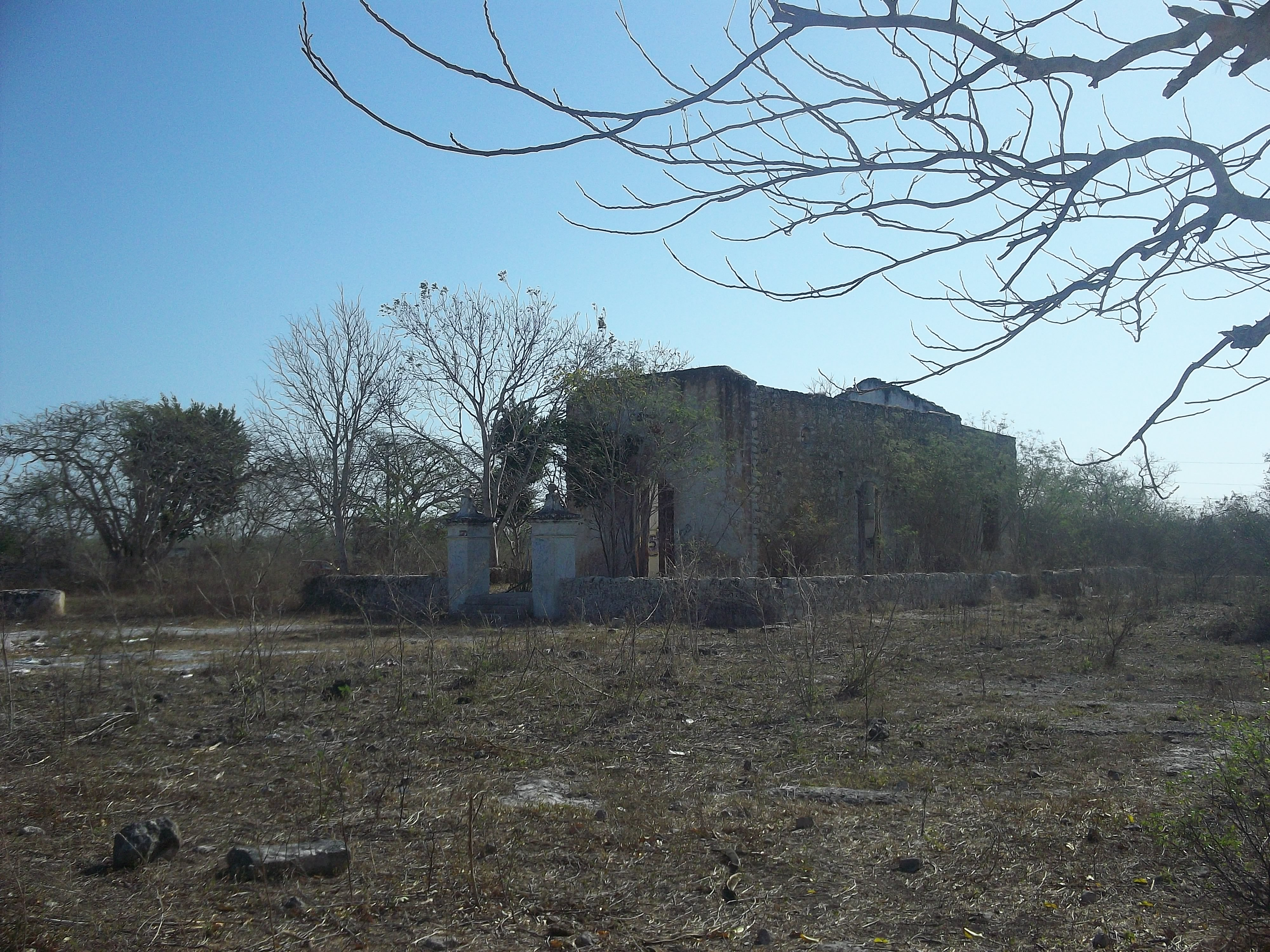

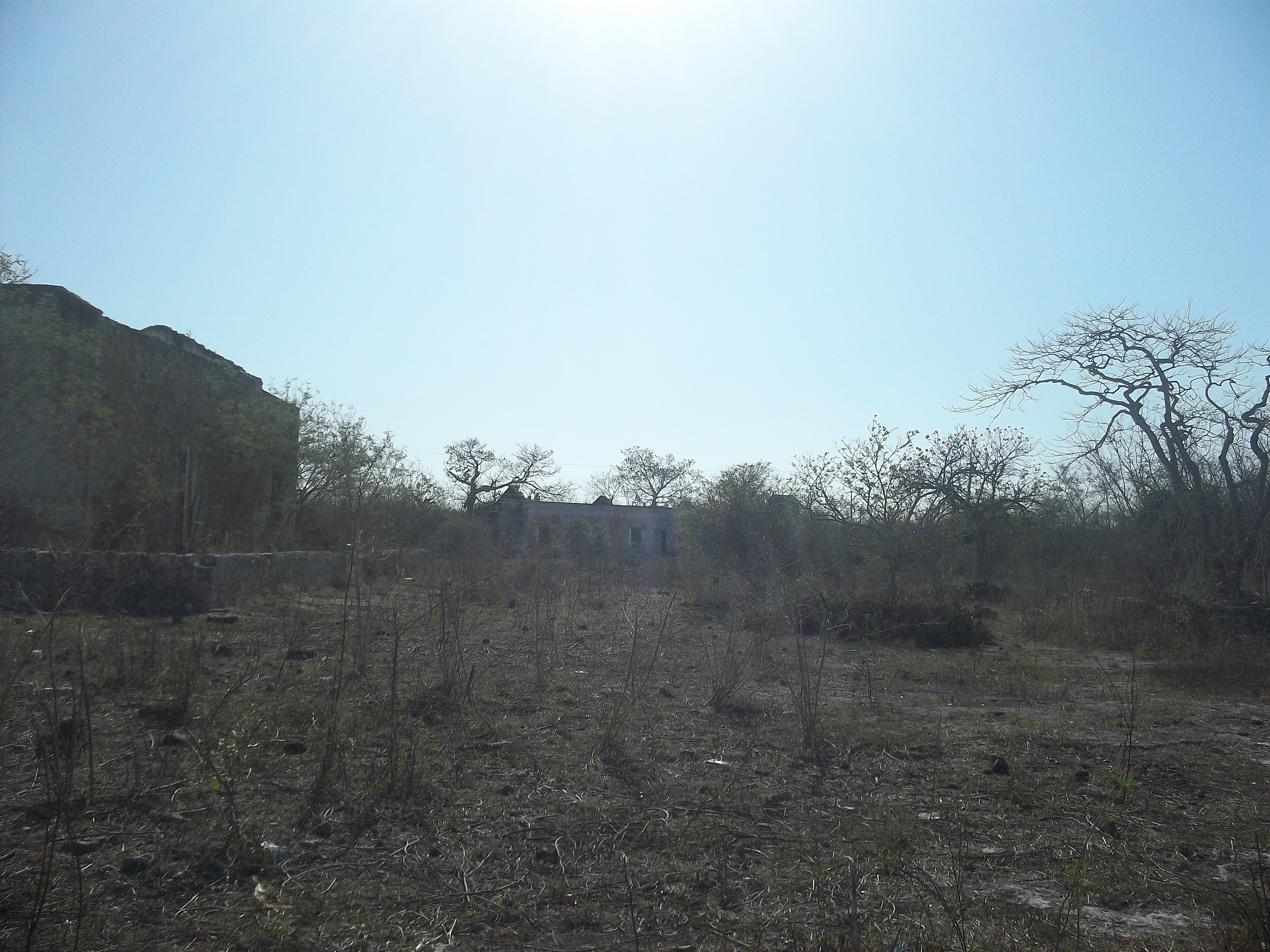

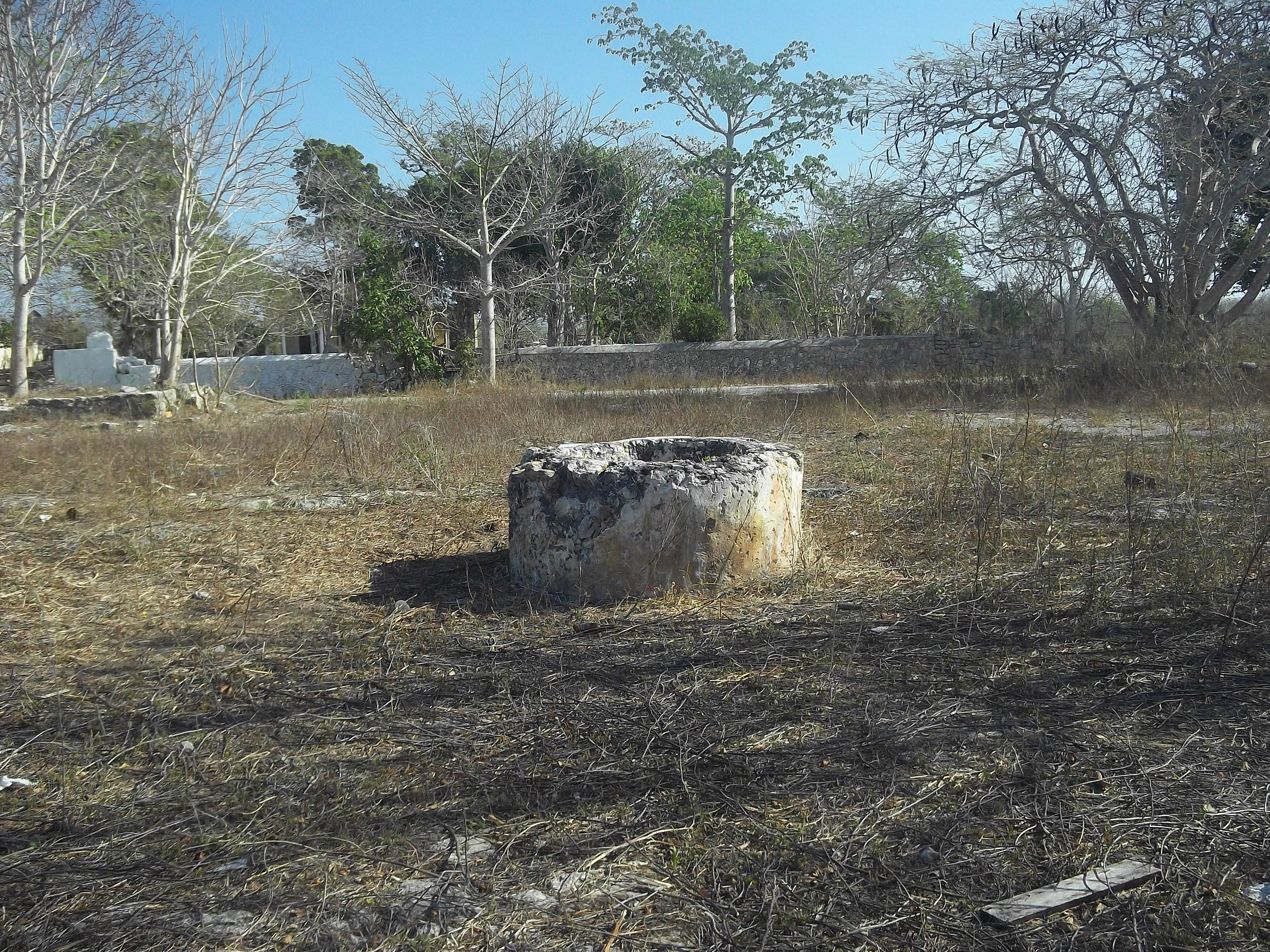
Misnebalam Water Well.

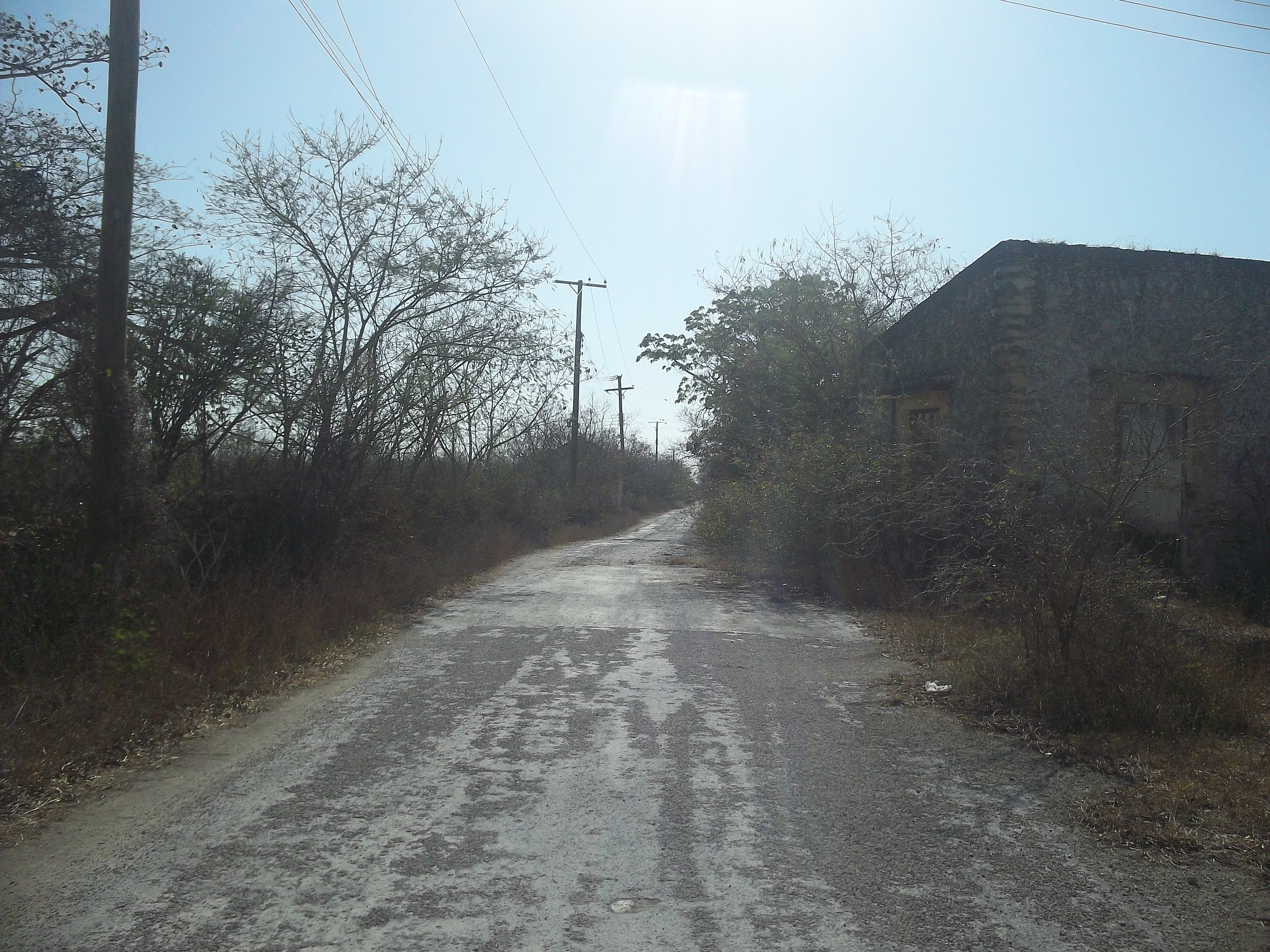
Other view of Street.

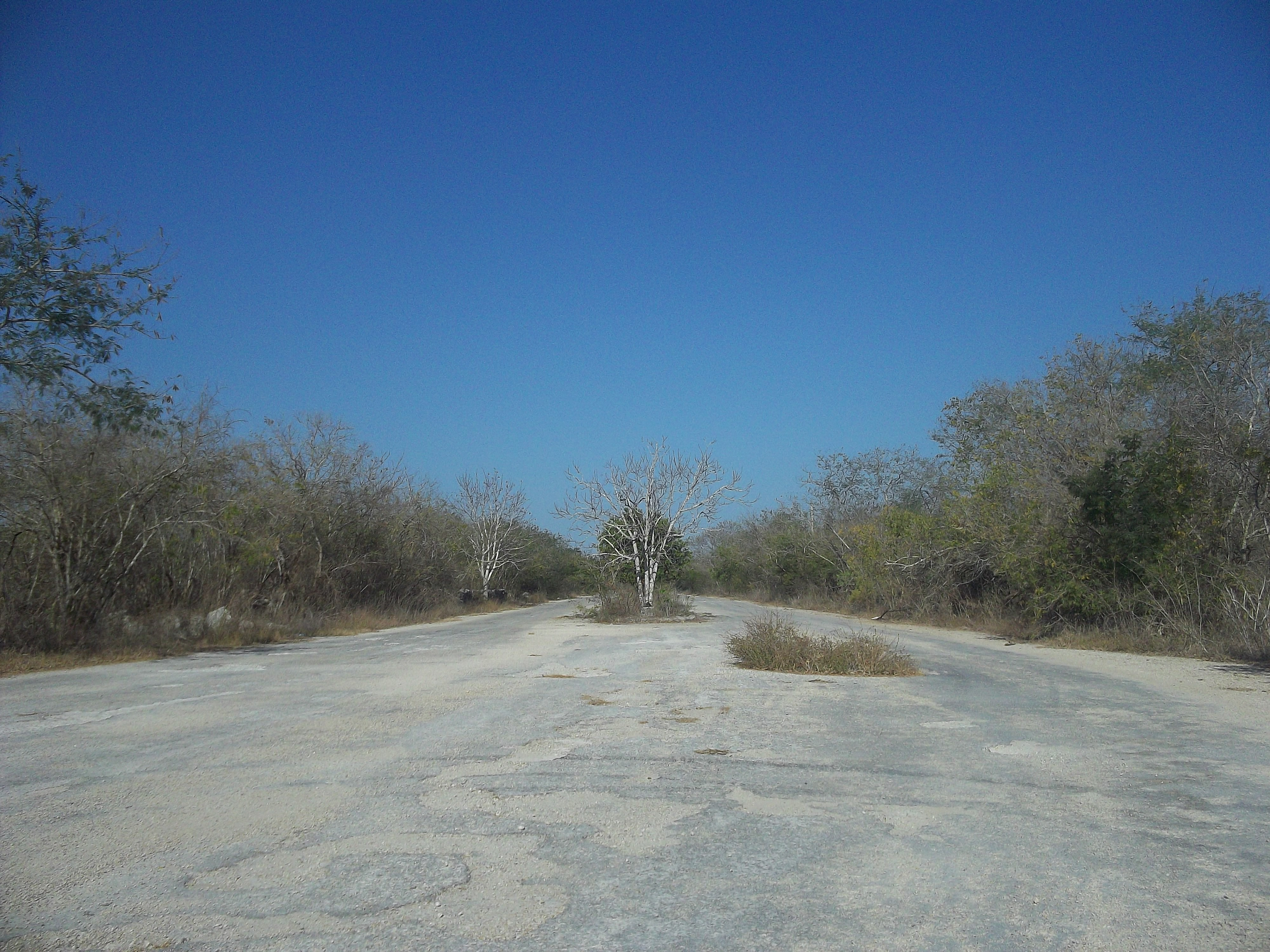

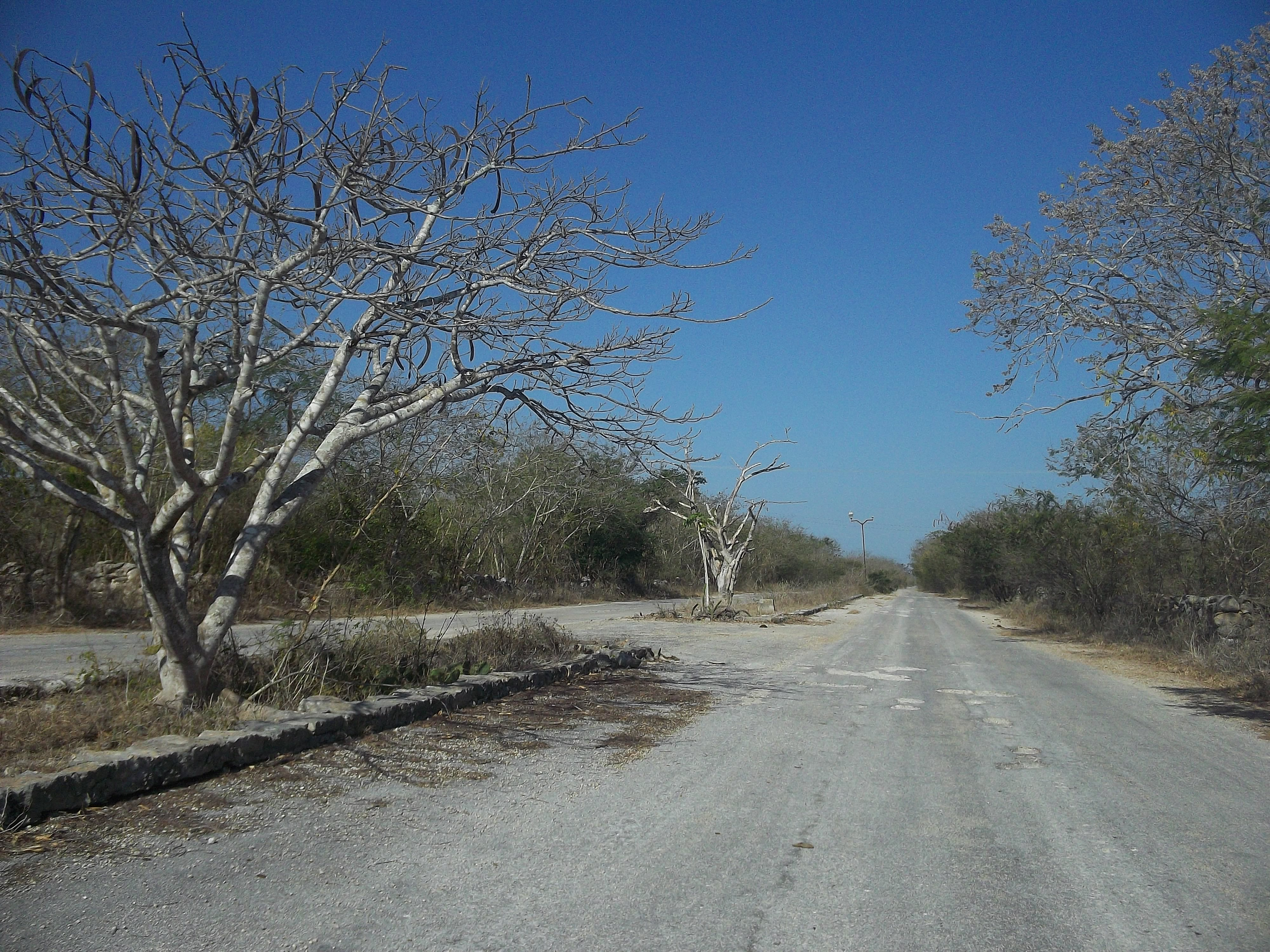
