= Mérida Municipality =

Municipality in the Mexican state of Yucatán

Merida
- Municipality
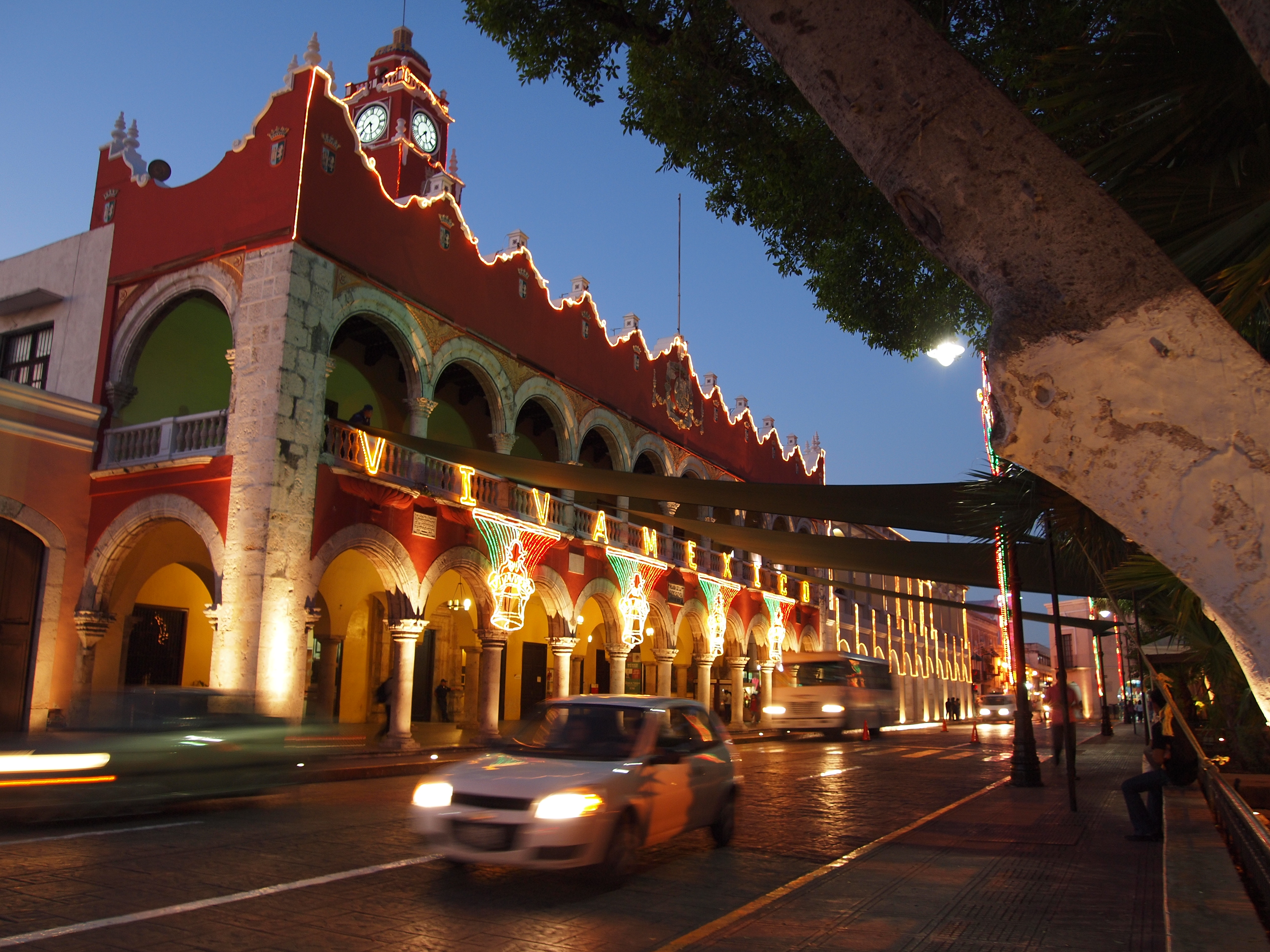
- Merida City Hall

- Coat of arms

- Location of the municipality in Yucatan

- Location of the municipality in Mexico
- Coordinates: 20°45′21″N 89°31′29″W
- Country: Mexico
- State: Yucatán
- Mexico Ind.: 1821
- Yucatán Est.: 1824
- Municipality Est: 1918
- Seat: Mérida

Government
  - Type: 2018 – 2021
  - Municipal President: Renán Barrera Concha

Area
  - Total: 858.41 km^{2} (331.43 sq mi)
- Elevation: 9 m (30 ft)

Population (2020)
  - Total: 995,129
  - Density: 1,159.3/km^{2} (3,002.5/sq mi)
- Time zone: UTC-6 (Central Standard Time)
- Area code: 999
- Major Airport: Merida (Manuel Crescencio Rejón) International Airport
- IATA Code: MID
- ICAO Code: MMMD
- Website: http://www.merida.gob.mx

Mérida Municipality is one of the 106 municipalities in the Mexican state of Yucatán containing 858.41 km^{2} of land with the head or seat being the city of Mérida. Because the archaeological remains of the Maya reminded the Spaniards of the ancient city of Mérida, Spain, which was marked by Roman archaeological sites, they renamed the site of T-hó after the Spanish city.

== History ==
What now constitutes the head of the municipality of Mérida, was a pre-Hispanic Itza Mayan town called T-hó (Yucatec Maya language meaning "five hills"), which was founded around the 12th century AD. By the time of the Spanish arrival, the city was virtually abandoned, though still used as a ceremonial center and its remnant buildings were of impressive monumental scale. Francisco de Montejo the Younger established the city of Mérida on the site on 6 January 1542. In the first year of the conquest, Montejo ordered the establishment of 54 encomiendas in favor of his soldiers and confirmed the three principal municipalities to be Mérida, Valladolid, and San Francisco de Campeche.

Overlapping jurisdictions occurred for the area at various times with the administration being under the Audiencia de Guatemala in 1549, but also the Viceroyalty of New Spain from 1549-1552. Then between 1552 and 1561 the area returned to the Audiencia de Guatemala and between 1561 and 1565 was again administered under the Viceroyalty of New Spain. In 1617, Yucatán became a Captaincy General in its own stead.

Yucatán declared its independence from the Spanish Crown in 1821 and in 1825, the area was distributed into 15 administrative partitions including Bacalar, Campeche, Hecelchakán, Hunucmá, Ichmul, Isla del Carmen, Izamal, Lerma, Mama, Mérida, Oxkutzcab, Seibaplaya, Sotuta, Tizimín and Valladolid. In 1840, Yucatán declared itself to be a free, independent nation with its capital located in Mérida. The following year treaties were signed for the peninsula to rejoin Mexico, but by 1842, independence was again declared. In 1843, a new treaty of reinstatement was signed, but in 1845 the peninsula withdrew because Mexico had not complied with the terms of the 1843 agreement. Finally in 1846 the peninsula agreed to reintegrate into Mexico but the outbreak of the Caste War, in 1847, an indigenous rebellion that took place throughout the Yucatán, delayed the full implementation until 1849.

The Constitution of 1850, redrafted the administrative divisions and made headquarters for the 17 partitions at: Bacalar, Bolonchenticul, Campeche, Espita, Hequelchakan, Isla del Carmen, Izamal, Maxcanú, Mérida, Motul, Peto, Seibaplaya, Sotuta, Tekax, Ticul, Tizimin, and Valladolid. In 1918, the modern municipality of Mérida was confirmed as the seat of the municipio and capital of the State.

== Governance ==
The municipal president is elected for a three-year term. The town council has seventeen councilpersons, who serve as Secretary and councilors of Markets, Utilities and Public Safety; Administration; Social Development; Public Security; Entertainment; Urban Development and Ecology; Public Works; Youth And Sports; Women; Health and Disability; Economic Development; Tourism; Heritage; Education; and Culture.

The Municipal Council administers the business of the municipality. It is responsible for budgeting and expenditures and producing all required reports for all branches of the municipal administration. Annually it determines educational standards for schools.

The Police Commissioners ensure public order and safety. They are tasked with enforcing regulations, distributing materials and administering rulings of general compliance issued by the council.

== Geography ==
The land throughout the municipality is virtually flat, without any areas of the elevation, and like much of the Yucatan Peninsula has no surface water streams. There are cenotes both underground and at the surface (collapsed caverns). The climate is semi-humid, with temperature range between a maximum of 40 °C and minimum 14 °C.

== Communities ==
The head of the municipality is Mérida, Yucatán. There are 158 populated areas of the municipality. The most notable include Caucel, Chablekal, Cholul, Chuburná de Hidalgo, Cosgaya, Dzityá, Dzununcán, Komchén, Molas, San José Tzal, Sierra Papacal and Sitpach. Communities of 50 people or more (as of 2005) are listed below, along with numerous smaller ones (not listed).

Communities of 50 people or more in the Mérida Municipality
Community	Pop	Community	Pop	Community	Pop
Mérida	734,153	Leona Vicario	1,822	Seminario San Pablo	53
Caucel	6,655	Molas	1,859	Sierra Papacal	986
Chablekal	3,165	Noc Ac	437	Sitpach	1,502
Chalmuch	454	Oncán	606	Susulá	447
Cheumán	197	Opichén	327	Suytunchén	92
Cholul	5,161	Petac	183	Tahdzibichén	678
Cosgaya	584	Sac-Nicté	278	Tamanché	555
Dzibilchaltún	156	San Antonio Hool	135	Temozón Norte	270
Dzidzilché	153	San Antonio Tzacalá	618	Texán Cámara	483
Dzityá	1,496	San Diego Texán	81	Tixcacal	765
Dzoyaxché	412	San Ignacio Tesip	329	Tixcuytún	348
Dzununcán	1,528	San José Tzal	3,092	Xcanatún	1,350
Hunxectamán	104	San Pedro Chimay	1,012	Xcunyá	837
Kikteil	216	Santa Cruz Palomeque	718	Xmatkuil	357
Komchén	3,778	Santa María Chí	328	Yaxché Casares	50
La Ceiba	1,023	Santa María Yaxché	50	Yaxnic	703

== Local festivals ==
Every year on 6 January the founding of the city is acknowledged in a citywide festival. Also annually from 27 September to 14 October is a celebration in honor of Santo Cristo de las Ampollas.

== Tourist attractions ==
- La Casa de Montejo (1549)
- Catedral de San Ildefonso (1598), first in the continental Americas
- Palacio de Gobierno (1892)
- Monumento à la Patria (1956)
- Haciendas of Yucatán: 18th century farms associated with the Henequen industry in Yucatán.
- Misnebalam Ghost Town
