= Komchen =

Komchén
- Town
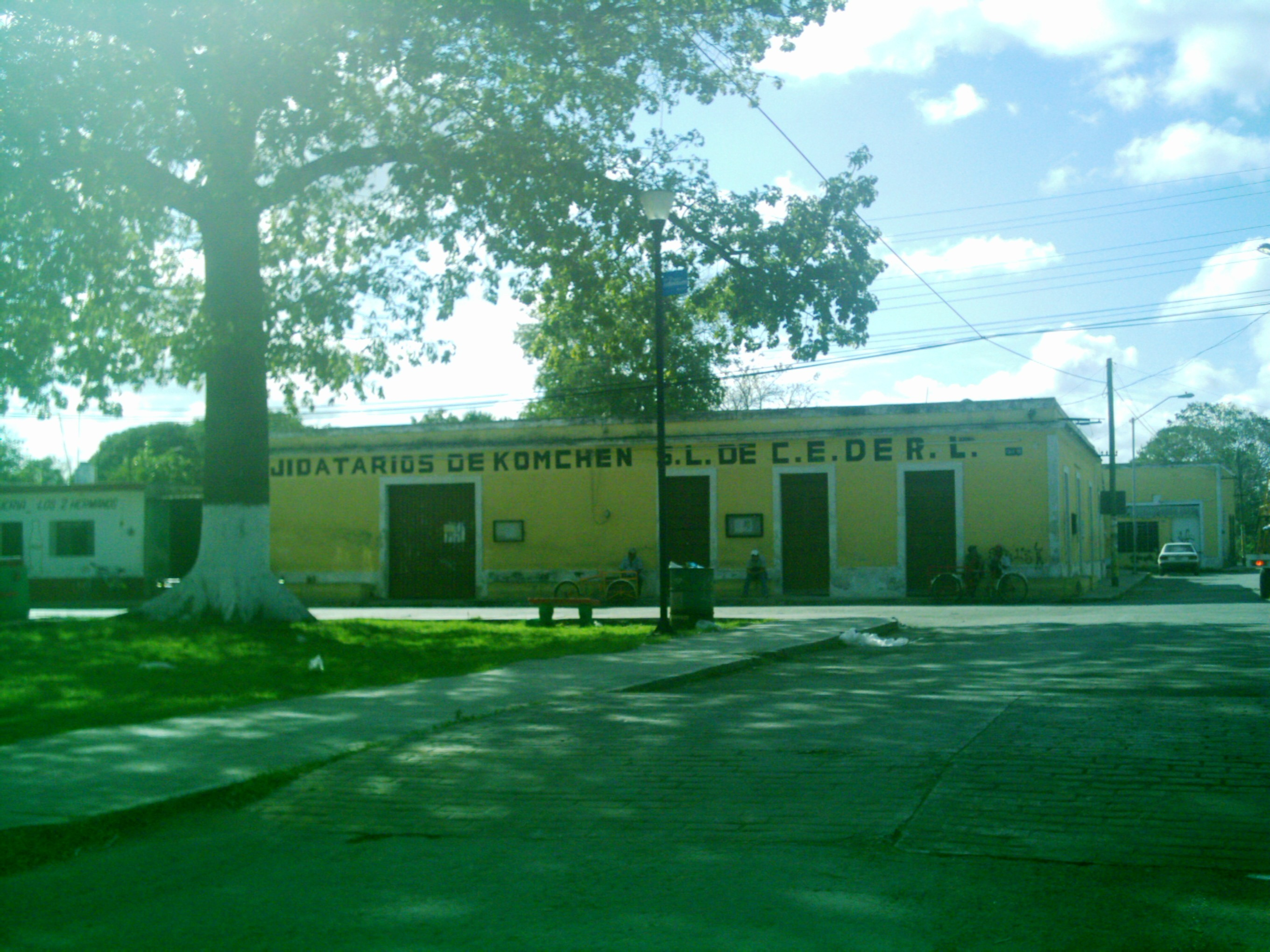

- Location within Yucatán (state) Location within Mexico
- Coordinates: 21°06′13″N 89°39′45″W
- Country: Mexico
- State: Yucatán
- Municipality: Mérida

Population (2005)
  - Total: 3,778
- Time zone: UTC-6 (Central Standard Time)
  - Summer (DST): UTC-5 (Central Daylight Time)
- Major Airport: Merida (Manuel Crescencio Rejón) International Airport
- IATA Code: MID
- ICAO Code: MMMD
- Website: Merida

Komchén is a community in the Mérida Municipality in the state of Yucatán, located in southeastern Mexico. Komchén is located 15 kilometers north of the city of Mérida, in the northwestern portion of the Yucatán Peninsula and is approximately 20 km from the northern peninsular coast. Its name comes from the Yucatec Mayan and means: In the well of the hollow. Its infrastructure includes, educational services (a kindergarten, a primary school, a high school and a Bachelors School and a municipal library), a clinic of the Mexican Social Security Institute as well as recreational parks and marinas. 90% of its streets are paved.

== Pre-Columbian History ==
Komchén is also the location of a pre-Columbian Maya archaeological site of the same name and is situated close to the site of Dzibilchaltun. Pre-Columbian Komchén was initially settled during the Mesoamerican Middle Preclassic. Its earliest settlement consisted of a small residential community with perishable structure. The site transitioned into a larger community during the Late Preclassic, reaching its peak in construction between the years 350-150 BC and employing permanent stone masonry in architectural construction. It appears that the site was entirely abandoned by the end of the Late Preclassic (ca. A.D. 250). Later, however, the site was partially reoccupied by residents of the expanding center of Dzibilchaltun.

Archaeological investigation of the site commenced during the early 1980s when a research project, under the direction of E. Wyllys Andrews V of the Middle American Research Institute (MARI) of Tulane University, began excavating at Komchén. This research documented nearly 1000 residential structures in an area approximately 2 km^{2} in size, including a core of five large platforms (the tallest of which was 8 meters) and a sacbe (one of the earliest identified in the Yucatán).
