= Hacienda San Pedro Chimay =

- Private Residence
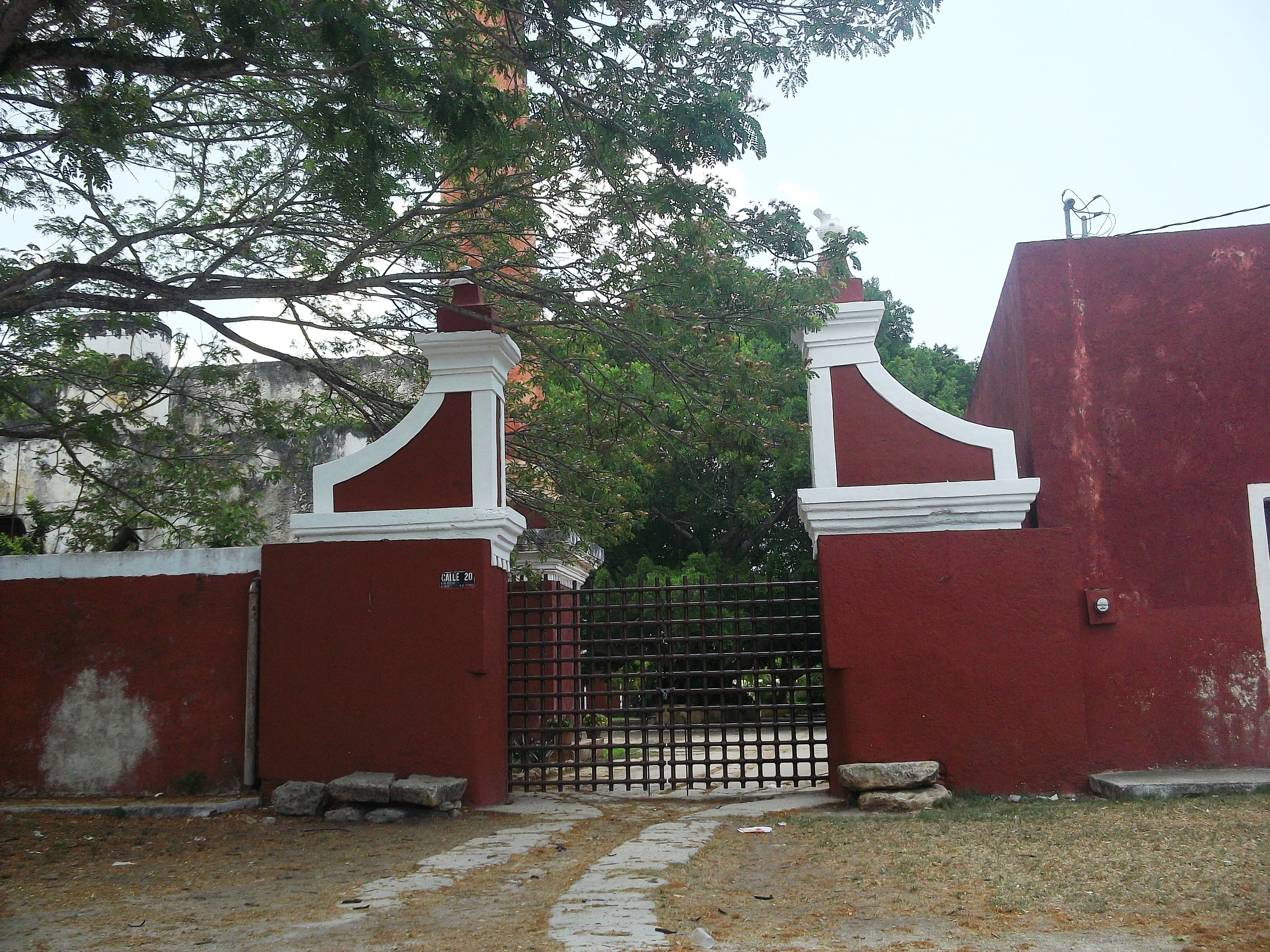
- Entrance

- Cuxtal Ecological Reserve

- Location in Mexico
- Coordinates: 20°51′55″N 89°34′46″W
- Country: Mexico
- Mexican States: Yucatán
- Municipalities: Mérida Municipality

Population (2005)
  - Total: 1,012
- Time zone: UTC−6 (CST)
  - Summer (DST): UTC−5 (CDT)
- Postal code: 97316
- Area code: 999

Hacienda San Pedro Chimay is located in the Mérida Municipality in the state of Yucatán in southeastern Mexico. It is one of the properties that arose during the nineteenth century henequen boom. It is part of the Cuxtal Ecological Reserve which was set aside in 1993 to protect both the man-made and natural history of the reserve area of Mérida.

== Toponymy ==
The name (San Pedro Chimay) is a combination of Maya and Spanish terms. "San Pedro" is Spanish for the patron saint of the chapel Saint Peter and "Chimay" is from the Mayan language and indicates a type of Acacia plant.

== How to get there ==
The property is located 7 km south of the Periférico of Mérida on the Carretera Mérida–Timucuy.

== History ==
The hacienda was built in the late sixteenth or early seventeenth century and is one of the oldest haciendas close to Mérida. In the eighteenth century, it was owned by the descendants of Bonifaz Lara, who was originally from Spain. Juan Miguel Castro, founder of the Port of Progreso refurbished his wife's family home in 1852, and dedicated the reconstruction with a dated plaque to his wife, María de Jesús Lara.

After the Castro Lara family, the estate passed to the Cervera family, when the owner surnamed Castro Rocher left the property to his wife Margarita Cervera Solis upon his death. José Eduardo Seijo Gutierrez, acquired the hacienda in 1982 from 10 lenders that had foreclosed on it. The family uses the property as their "country home", since it has a nice pool and a productive vegetable garden.

On 28 June 1993 the Cuxtal Ecological Reserve was designated to protect the history of the 7 large haciendas, their adjoining pueblas, 12 minor archaeological sites, 6 cenotes and one of Mérida's important water supply stations. Hacienda San Pedro Chimay was part of this historic designation.

Within the reserve are the following protected haciendas:

- Hacienda Hunxectamán in the village of Uxec Taman
- Hacienda San Antonio Tahdzibichén
- Hacienda San Ignacio Tesip in the village of Tesip
- Hacienda San Nicolás Dzoyaxché, contains Cenote Dzonot-Ich on its grounds
- Hacienda San Pedro Chimay
- Hacienda Santa Cruz Palomeque
- Hacienda Xmatkuil

== Architecture ==
The southern entrance predates the northern. The northern entrance of the estate was built to reverse the entrance toward Campeche when the property was rebuilt in 1852. The north has a singular arch framed with large stone pillars, three-pointed arch and a diamond center.

The main house was possibly built on a pre-Hispanic base. In the eastern corner of the corridor which slopes upward, one of the column capitals evidences a stone with a different cut than the others, which may have the frets of a Mayan temple. This wide corridor of multiple arches supported by pillars and decorative capitals is a unique feature of the hacienda.

The architecture of the main buildings dates from the colonial era. After its 19th-century remodel, the property went through a period of decline. The property recently was restored and a new esplanade was constructed. The back of the main house, facing south, also has main arches and ornate stone pillars with windows decorated with stuccoed colonial style headers. At the top of the building are neoclassical decorations and carved stone pipes.

On the west end of the main house is a green space, where the kitchen of the main house was and beneath that, the carpentry workshops and warehouses formerly used for bales of sisal. Another large green area precedes the entrance to the main house and to the east side are the former stables. Farther east is large bricked terrace with French-mosaic tiles, a pool and fountain. The pool is fed by water from three wells fed by a cenote located under the terrace. The edge of the pool is stone. There also is a cistern with stone stairs. A wide stone staircase connects to the entrance on the north side of the main house, where evidence of neoclassical and French influences of the nineteenth century are seen.

At the opposite end of the concourse are two fireplaces, one of which has a Moorish mantel. On one side of the thinner chimney is the inscription "JMC January 1875". The wider fireplace is the oldest and served the mill. In this same area is the powerhouse and all the parts of the threshing equipment.

The Church, is located in the left side of the house and is surrounded by large trees. The belfry has three spaces which are adorned with goblets of majolica in green and ivory. Inside one of the spaces hangs copper bell. A wrought iron cross is affixed to the front of the church.

A wooden altar, with gold leaf detailing and a small choir with ornate wooden railing are preserved. The choir is accessed by a stone staircase located outside the chapel. In each of the ends of the altarpiece there are the images of Jesus of Nazareth and the Virgin Mary.

== Demographics ==
All of the henequen plantations ceased to exist as autonomous communities with the agrarian land reform implemented by President Lazaro Cardenas in 1937. His decree turned the haciendas into collective ejidos, leaving only 150 hectares to the former landowners for use as private property. Figures before 1937 indicate populations living on the farm. After 1937, figures indicate those living in the community, as the remaining Hacienda San Pedro Chimay houses only the owner's immediate family.

According to the 2005 census conducted by the INEGI, the population of the city was 1012 inhabitants, of whom 516 were men and 496 were women.

Population of San Pedro Chimay by year
Year	1900	1910	1921	1930	1940	1950	1960	1970	1980	1990	1995	2000	2005
Population	205	465	349	272	216	275	365	430	614	726	862	930	1012

== Bibliography ==
- Bracamonte, P and Solís, R., Los espacios de autonomía maya, Ed. UADY, Mérida, 1997.
- Gobierno del Estado de Yucatán, "Los municipios de Yucatán", 1988.
- Kurjack, Edward y Silvia Garza, Atlas arqueológico del Estado de Yucatán, Ed. INAH, 1980.
- Patch, Robert, La formación de las estancias y haciendas en Yucatán durante la colonia, Ed. UADY, 1976.
- Peón Ancona, J. F., "Las antiguas haciendas de Yucatán", en Diario de Yucatán, Mérida, 1971.

== Photo gallery ==
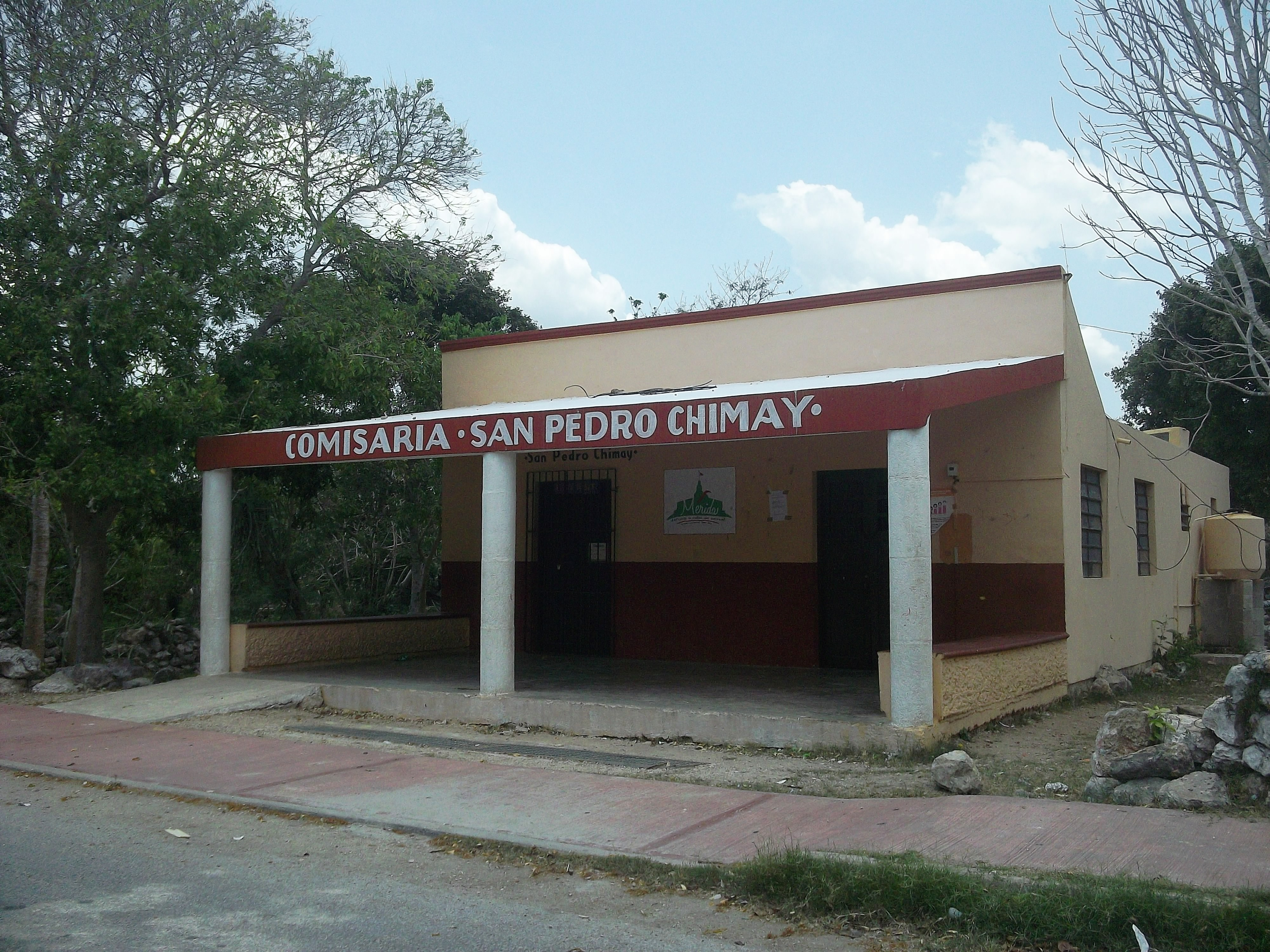
Company store of the Hacienda San Pedro Chimay

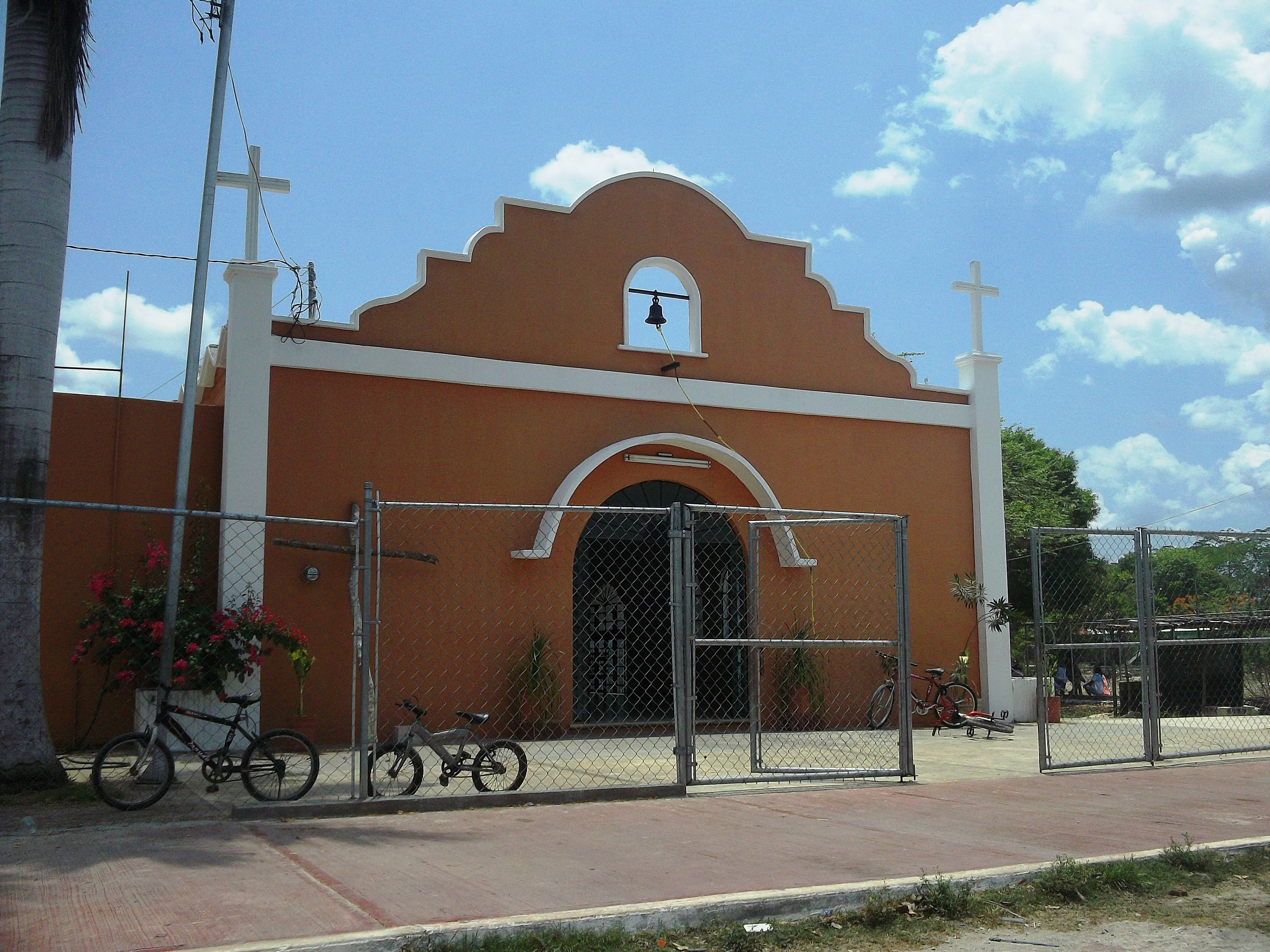
Church of the Hacienda San Pedro Chimay

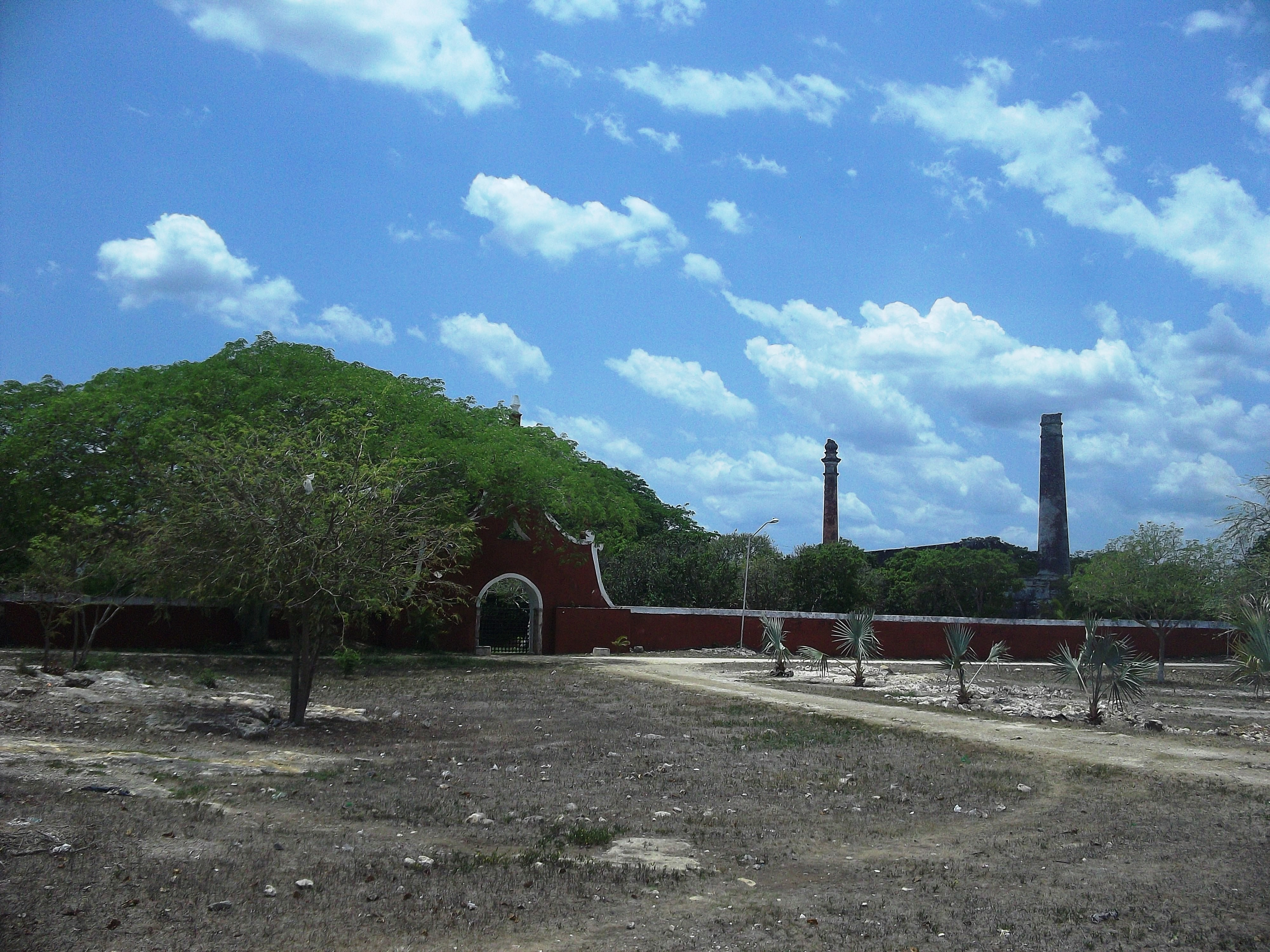
View of the Hacienda San Pedro Chimay

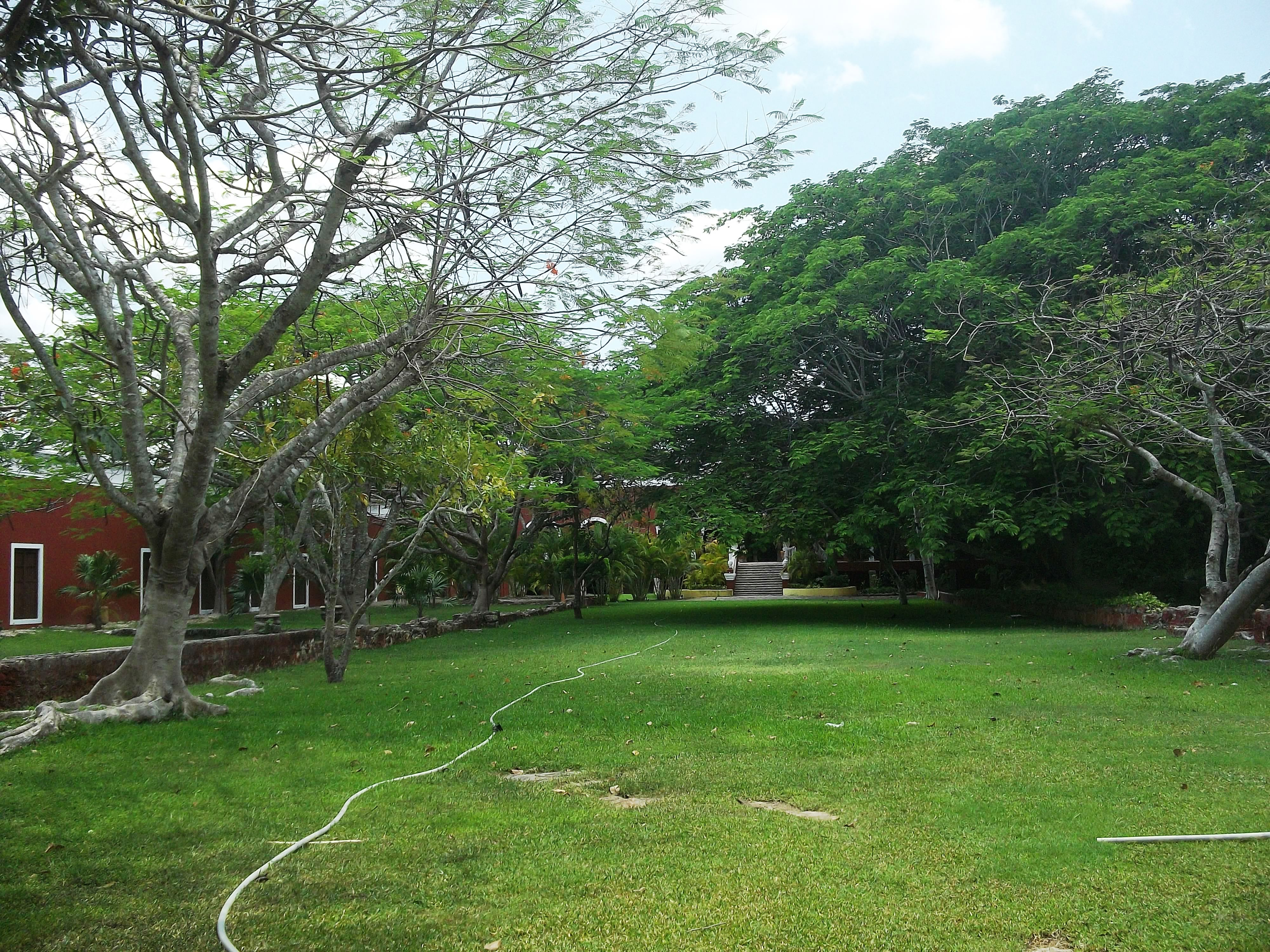
View of the Hacienda San Pedro Chimay

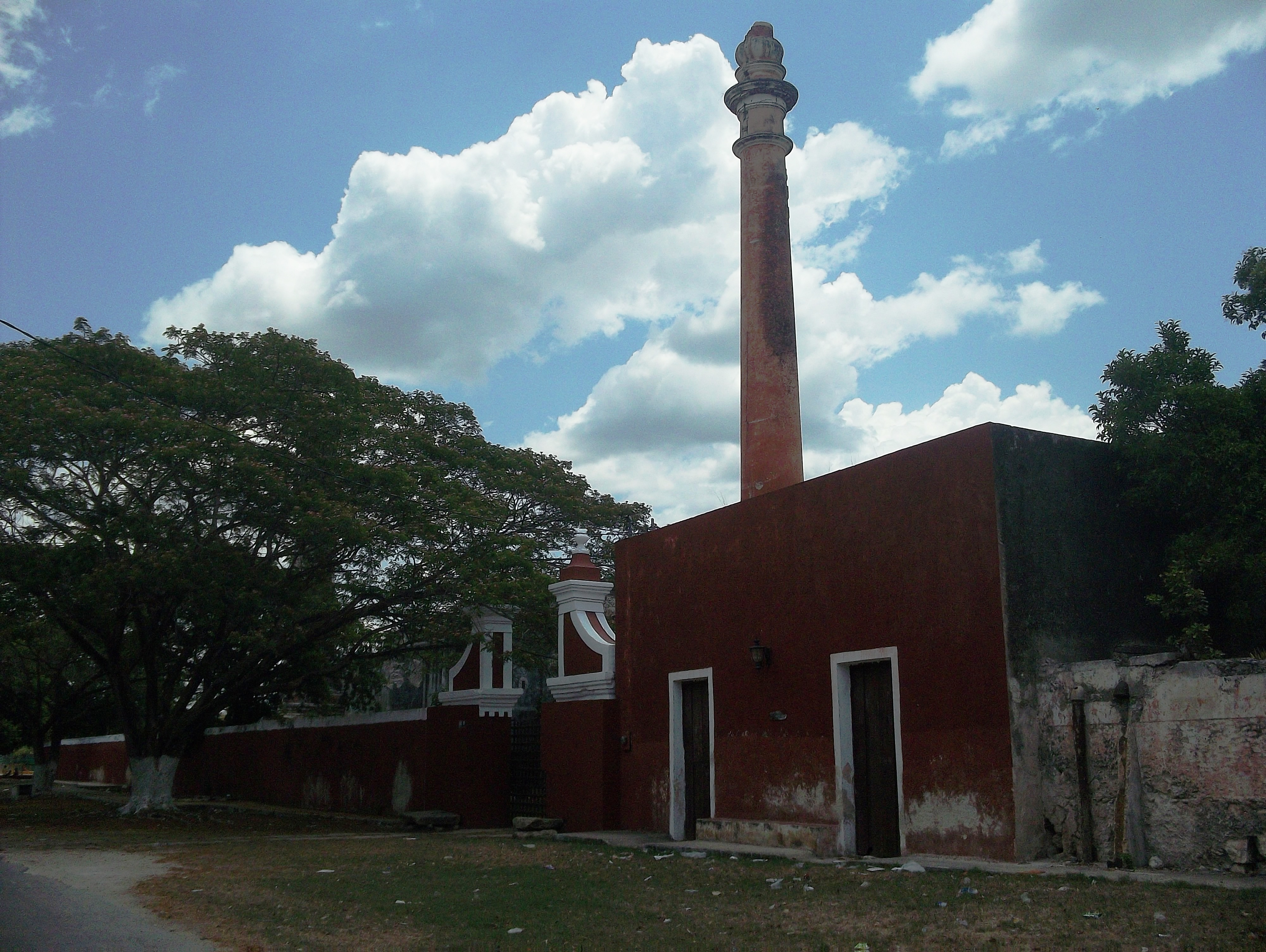
View of the Hacienda San Pedro Chimay

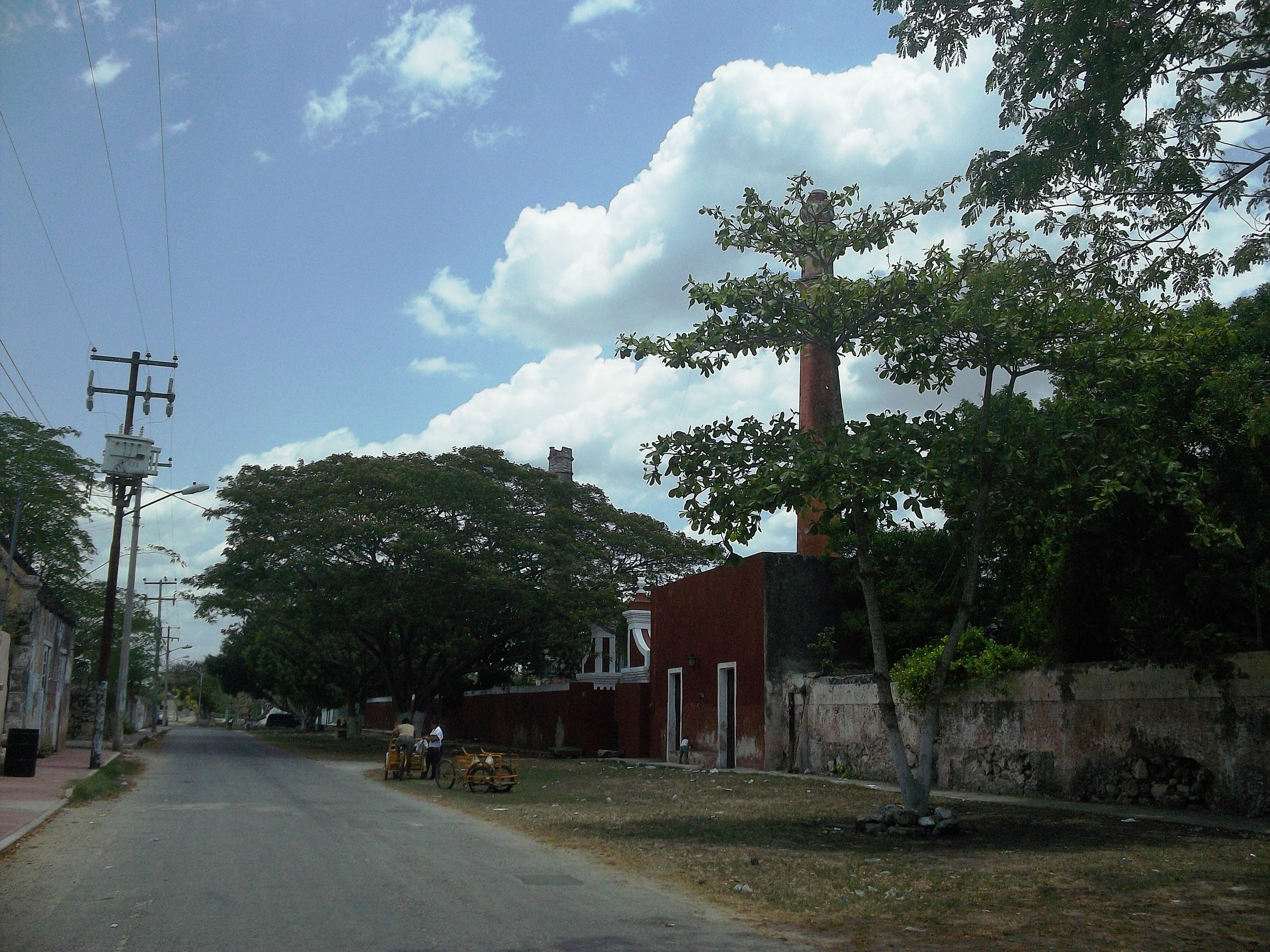
View of the Hacienda San Pedro Chimay

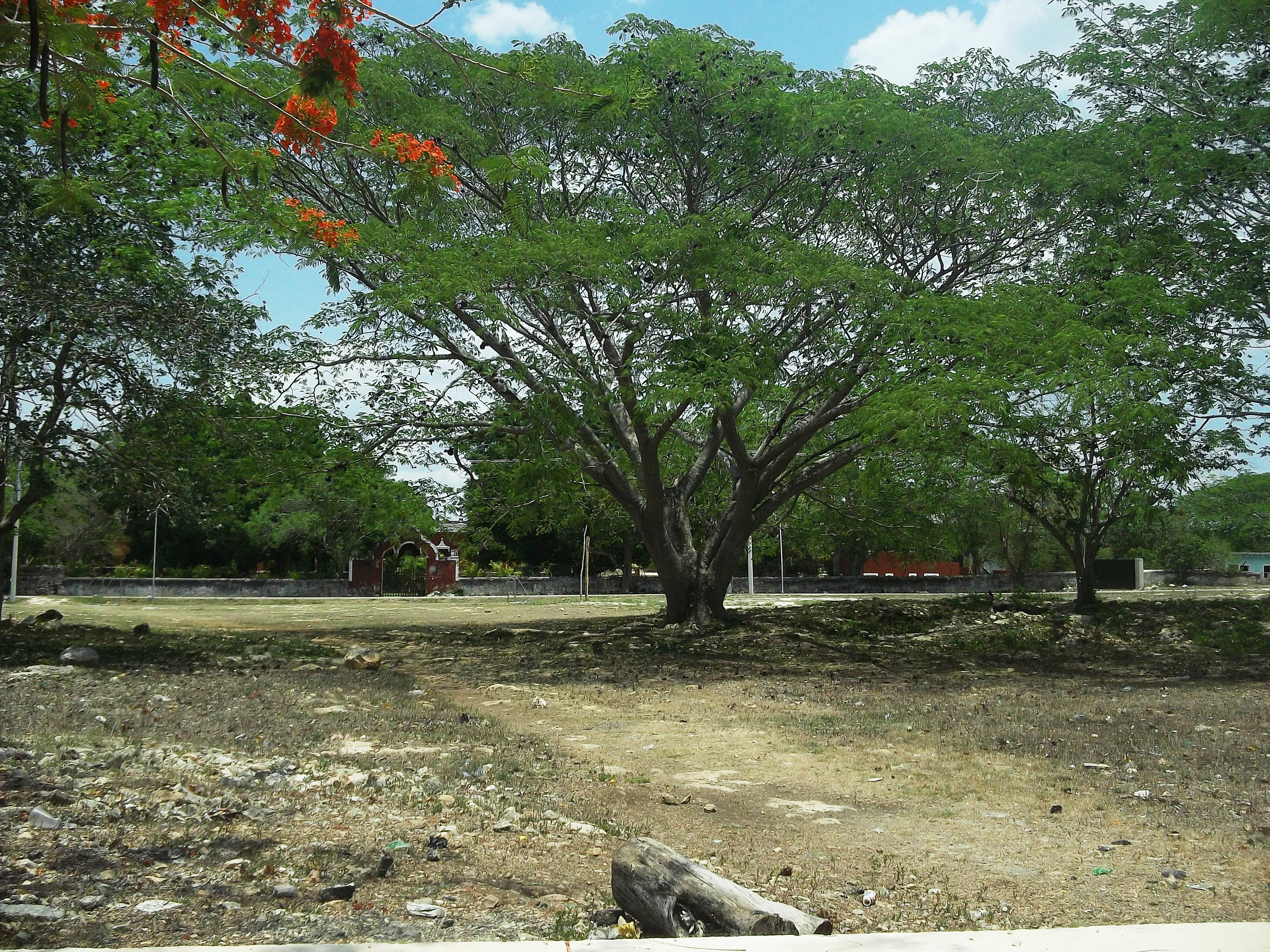
View of the Hacienda San Pedro Chimay

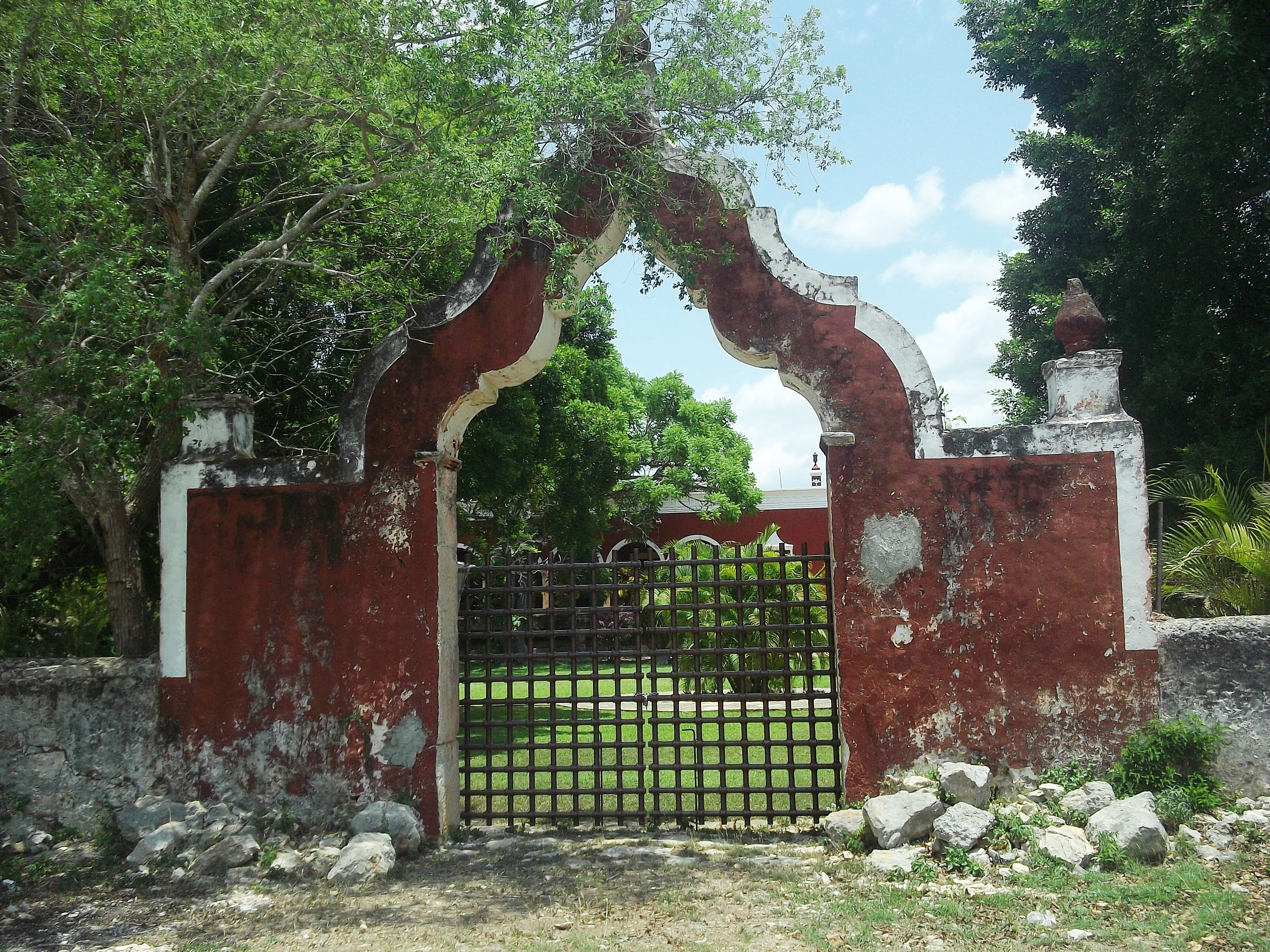
Entrance of the Hacienda San Pedro Chimay

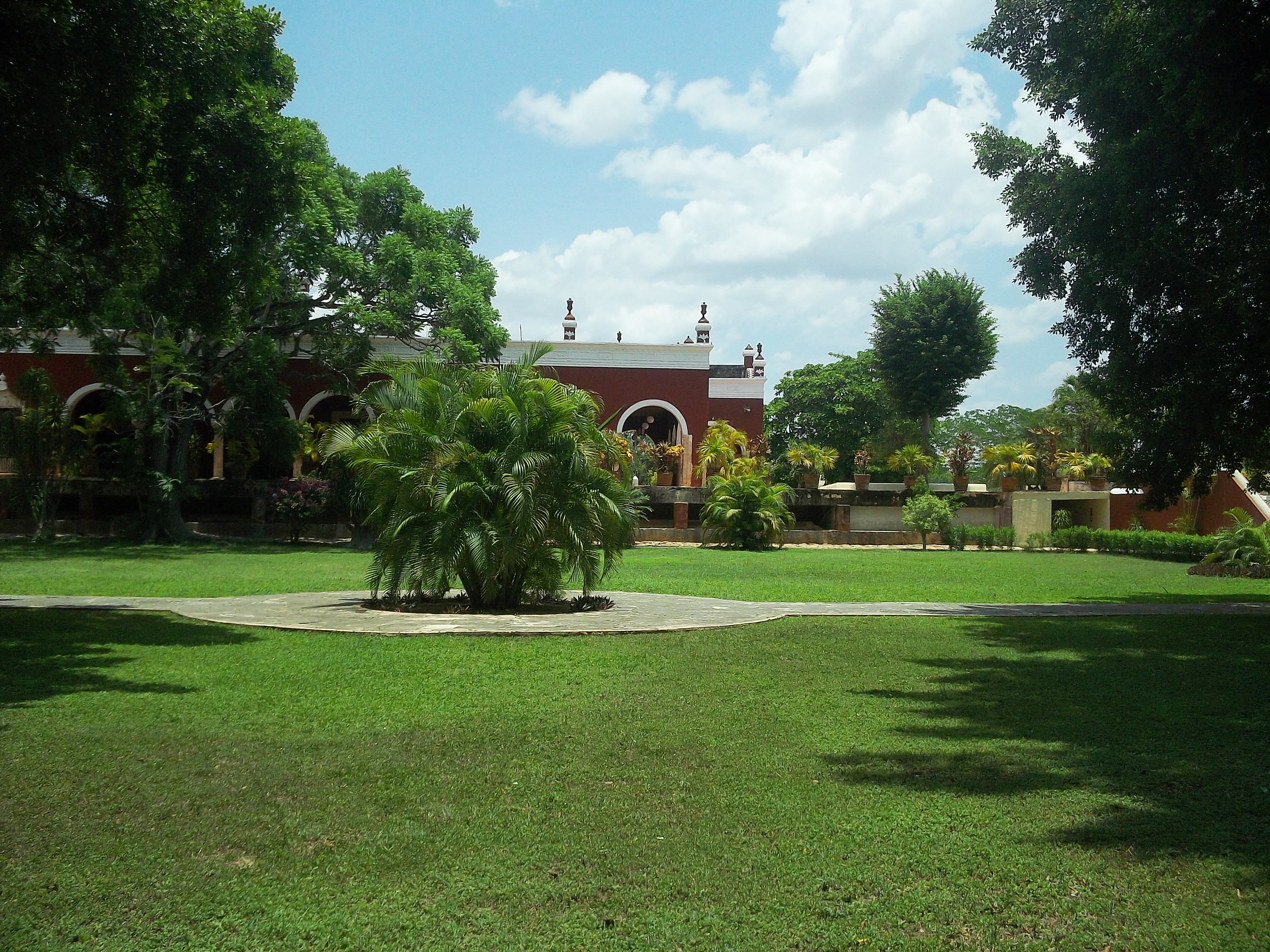
View of the Hacienda San Pedro Chimay

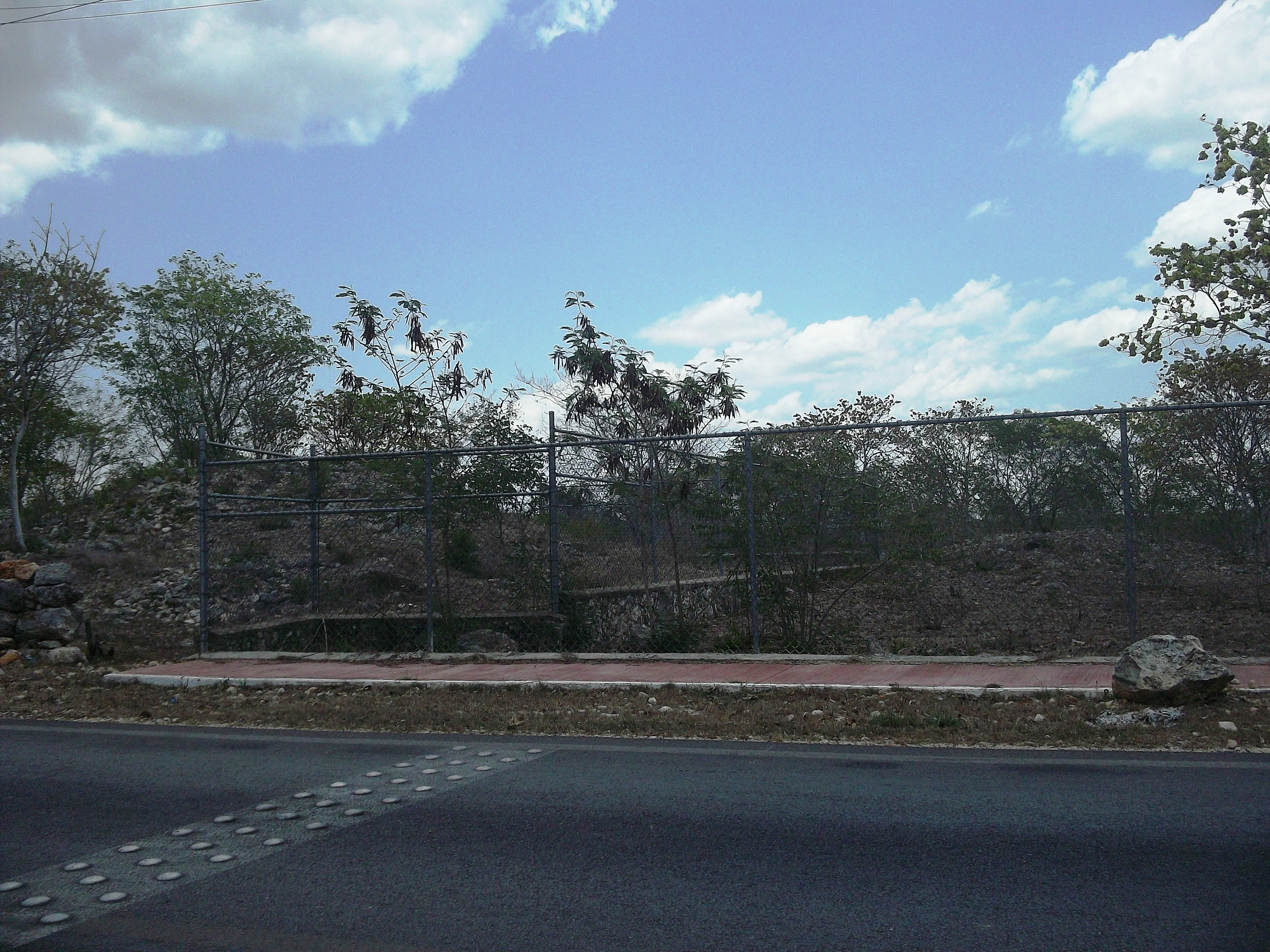
Archaeological site on the Hacienda San Pedro Chimay

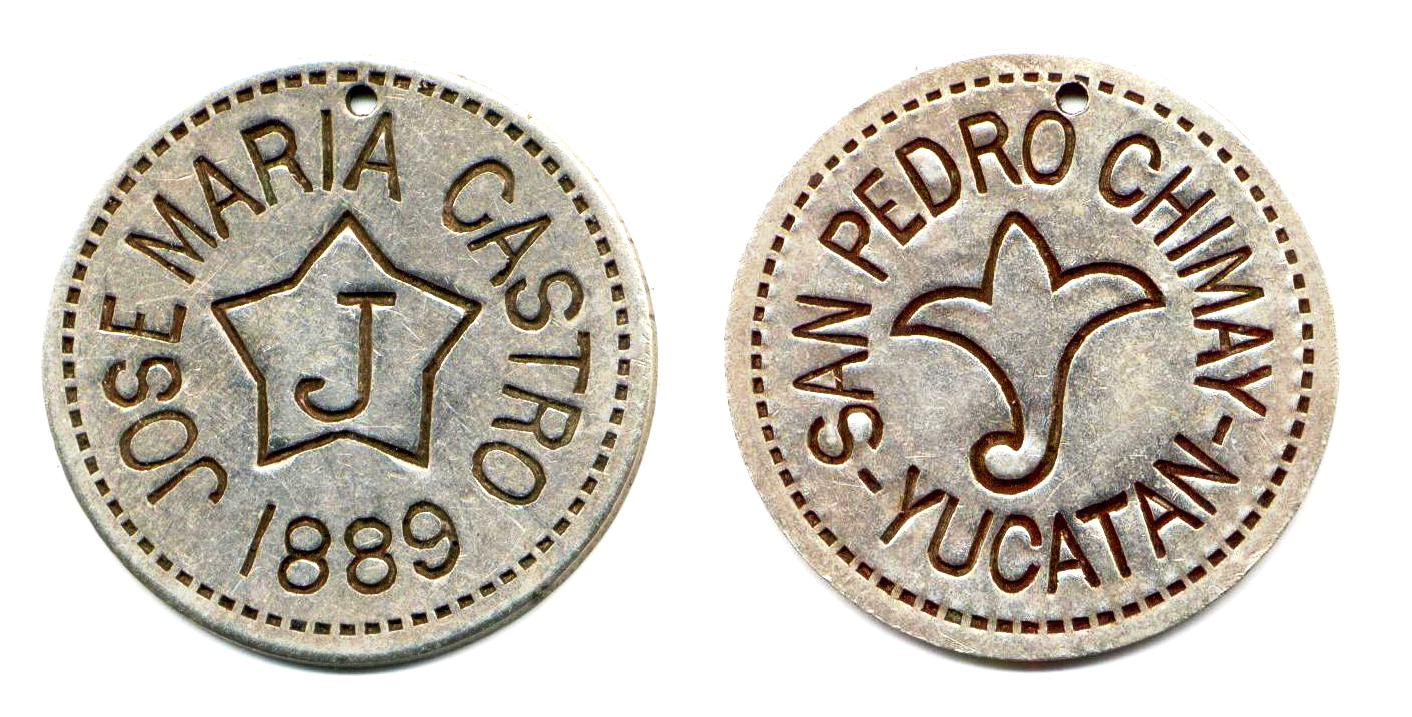
Tokens of the Hacienda San Pedro Chimay

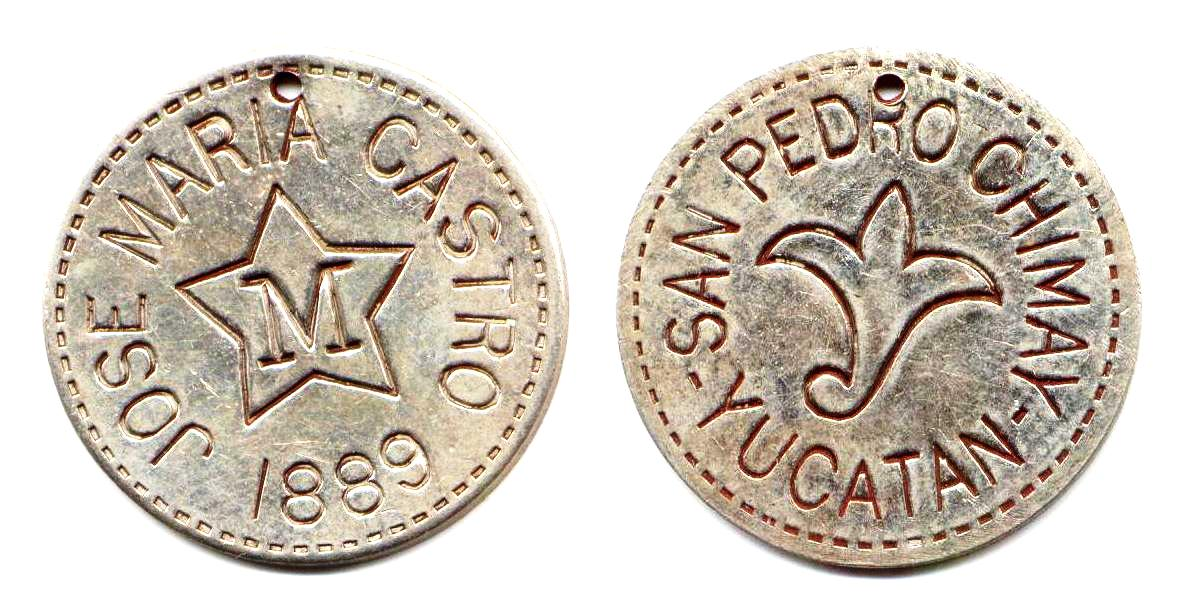
Tokens of the Hacienda San Pedro Chimay
