= Hacienda San Nicolás Dzoyaxché =

- Private Event Venue
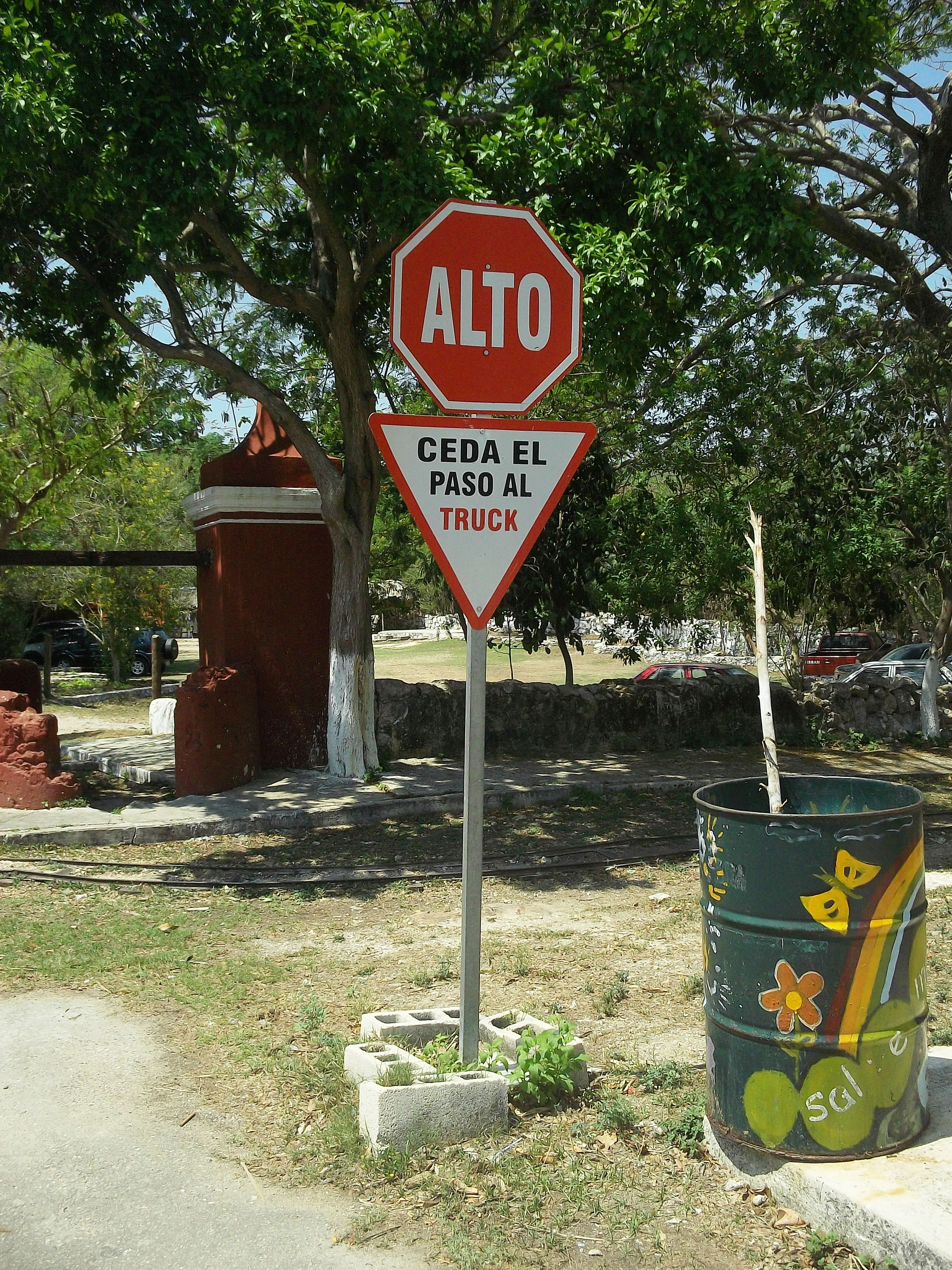
- Entrance Hacienda San Nicolás Dzoyaxché, Yucatán.

- Location in Yucatán
- Coordinates: 20°47′22″N 89°35′25″W
- Country: Mexico
- Mexican States: Yucatán
- Municipalities: Mérida Municipality
- Time zone: UTC−6 (CST)
  - Summer (DST): UTC−5 (CDT)
- Postal code: 97316
- Area code: 999

Hacienda San Nicolás Dzoyaxché (also known as Dzoyaxché) is located in the Mérida Municipality in the state of Yucatán in southeastern Mexico. It is one of the properties that arose during the nineteenth century henequen boom. It is part of the Cuxtal Ecological Reserve which was set aside in 1993 to protect both the man-made and natural history of the reserve area of Mérida.

== Toponymy ==
The name (San Nicolás Dzoyaxché) is a combination of Maya and Spanish terms. "San Nicolás" is Spanish for the patron saint of the chapel, Nicholas of Tolentino and "Dzoyaxché" is derived from the Mayan language. It comes from the words "dzo" meaning row and "yaxché", meaning ceiba. Thus a row of sacred trees.

== How to get there ==
The property is located 27 km south of Mérida on Calle 42.

== History ==
The chapel on the property was built in 1926 and every year from 10 to 20 September, fiesta in honor of the patron saint is held. There is a carving in marble from an Italian artist in the chapel dating from 1888. In 1952, the owner of the property was Francisco Martínez de Arredondo y Castro. When he died, it was inherited by Josefina Molina Vda. de Martínez de Arredondo. In 1962, she sold a portion of the hacienda to Nacional Financiera.

On 28 June 1993 the Cuxtal Ecological Reserve was designated to protect the history of the 7 large haciendas, their adjoining pueblos, 12 minor archaeological sites, 6 cenotes and one of Mérida's important water supply stations. Hacienda San Nicolás Dzoyaxché was part of this historic designation.

Within the reserve are the following protected haciendas:

- Hacienda Hunxectamán in the village of Uxec Taman
- Hacienda San Antonio Tahdzibichén
- Hacienda San Ignacio Tesip in the village of Tesip
- Hacienda San Nicolás Dzoyaxché
- Hacienda San Pedro Chimay
- Hacienda Santa Cruz Palomeque
- Hacienda Xmatkuil

The property currently allows tours, private events, and offers horseback riding, bicycle paths, swimming in the cenote and picnic grounds for nominal fees.

== Architecture ==
The Hacienda San Nicolás Dzoyaxché is built in a colonial style. One of its unique features is that the house is built over the Cenote Dzonot-Ich.

The 500 mm (19 3/4 in) narrow gauge horse-drawn tram, powerhouse, and machines are relics of the former use of the hacienda for henequen production.

== Demographics ==
All of the henequen plantations ceased to exist as autonomous communities with the agrarian land reform implemented by President Lazaro Cardenas in 1937. His decree turned the haciendas into collective ejidos, leaving only 150 hectares to the former landowners for use as private property. Figures before 1937 indicate populations living on the farm. After 1937, figures indicate those living in the community, as the remaining Hacienda San Nicolás Dzoyaxché houses only the owner's immediate family.

According to the 2005 census conducted by the INEGI, the population of the city was 412 inhabitants, of whom 218 were men and 194 were women.

Population of Dzoyaxché by year
Year	1930	1940	1950	1960	1970	1980	1990	1995	2000	2005
Population	235	183	155	193	246	301	317	361	366	412

== Bibliography ==
- Bracamonte, P and Solís, R., Los espacios de autonomía maya, Ed. UADY, Mérida, 1997.
- Gobierno del Estado de Yucatán, "Los municipios de Yucatán", 1988.
- Kurjack, Edward y Silvia Garza, Atlas arqueológico del Estado de Yucatán, Ed. INAH, 1980.
- Patch, Robert, La formación de las estancias y haciendas en Yucatán durante la colonia, Ed. UADY, 1976.
- Peón Ancona, J. F., "Las antiguas haciendas de Yucatán", en Diario de Yucatán, Mérida, 1971.

== Photo gallery ==
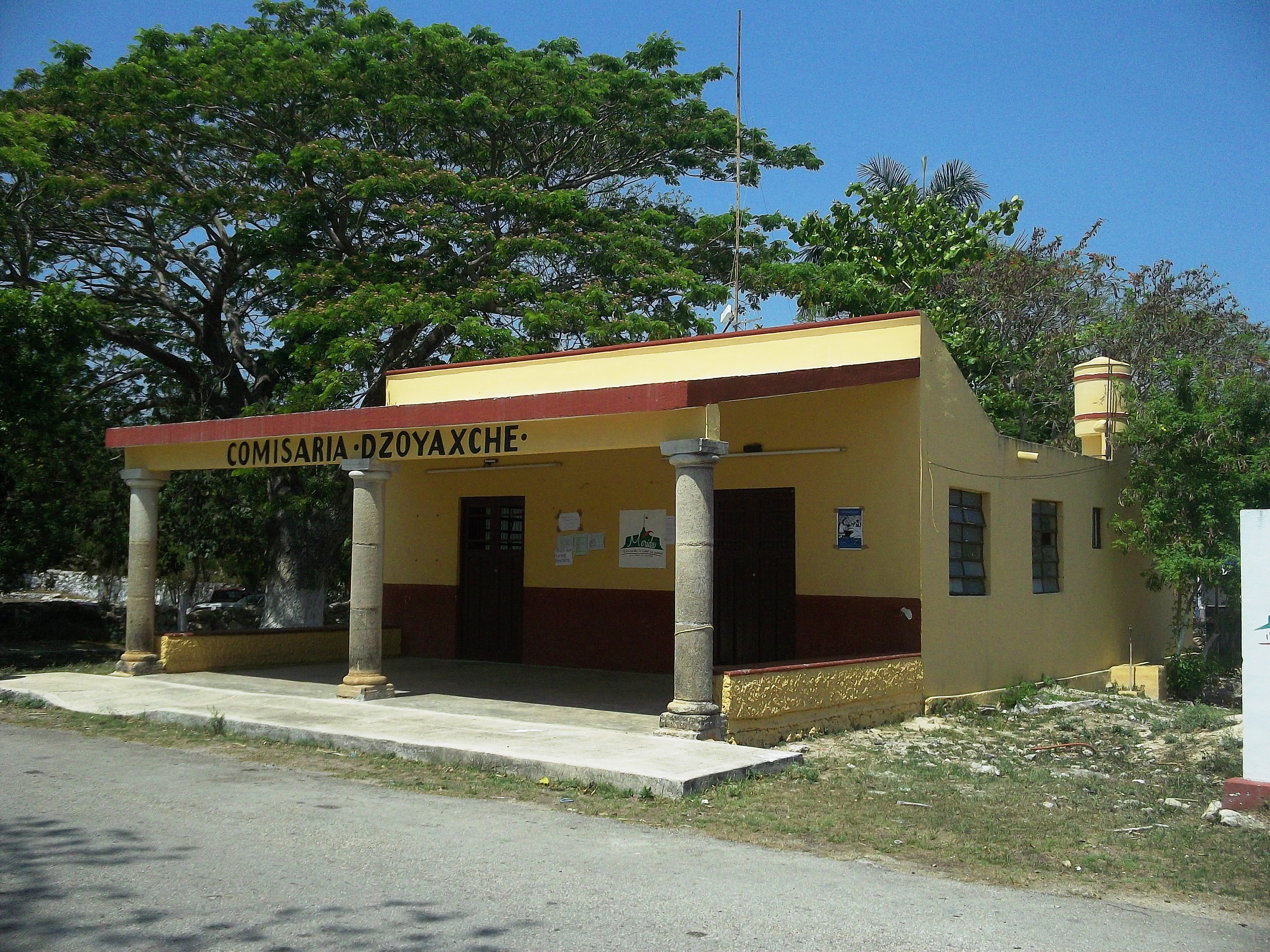
Company Store at Hacienda San Nicolás Dzoyaxché

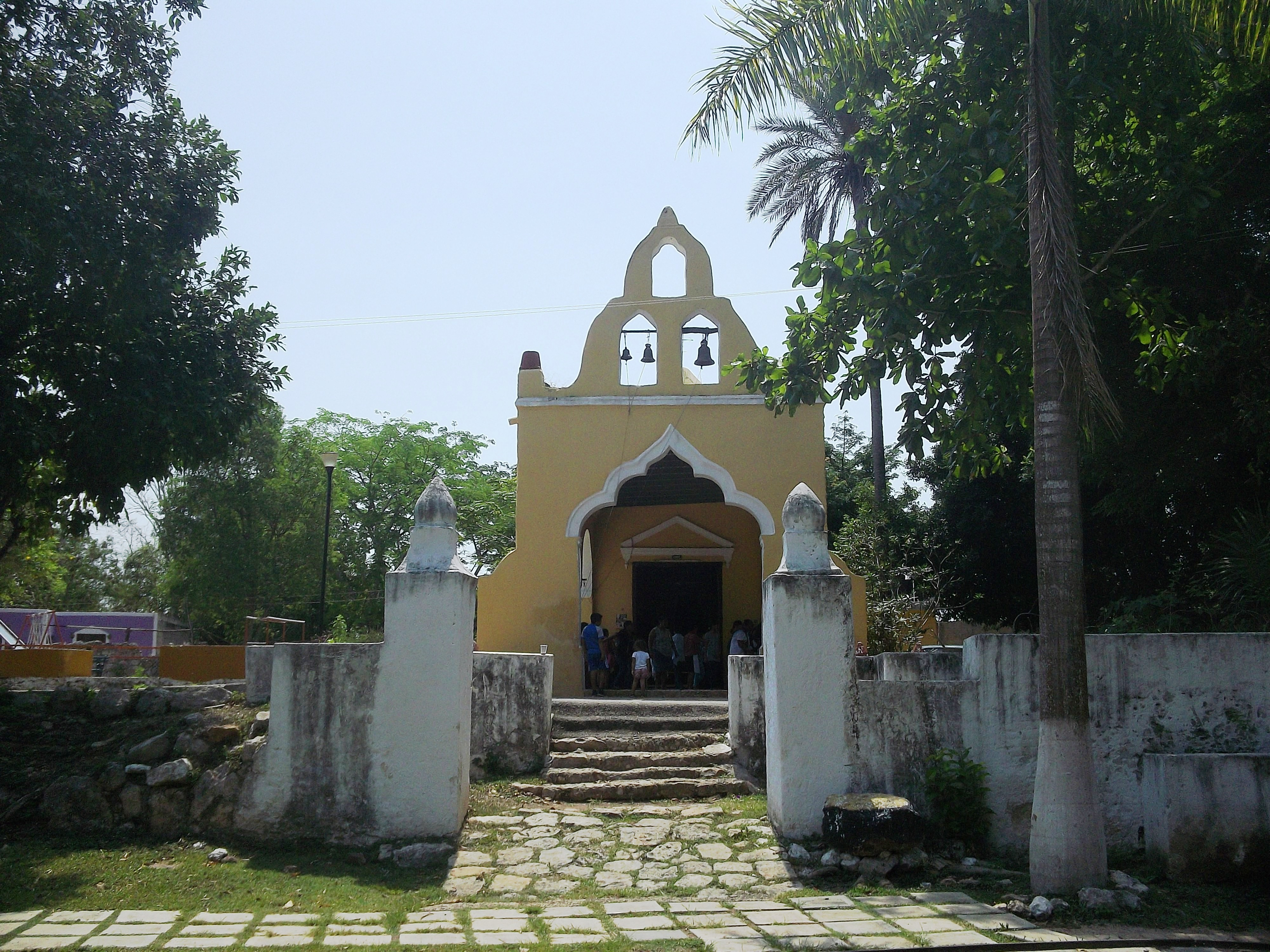
Church at Hacienda San Nicolás Dzoyaxché

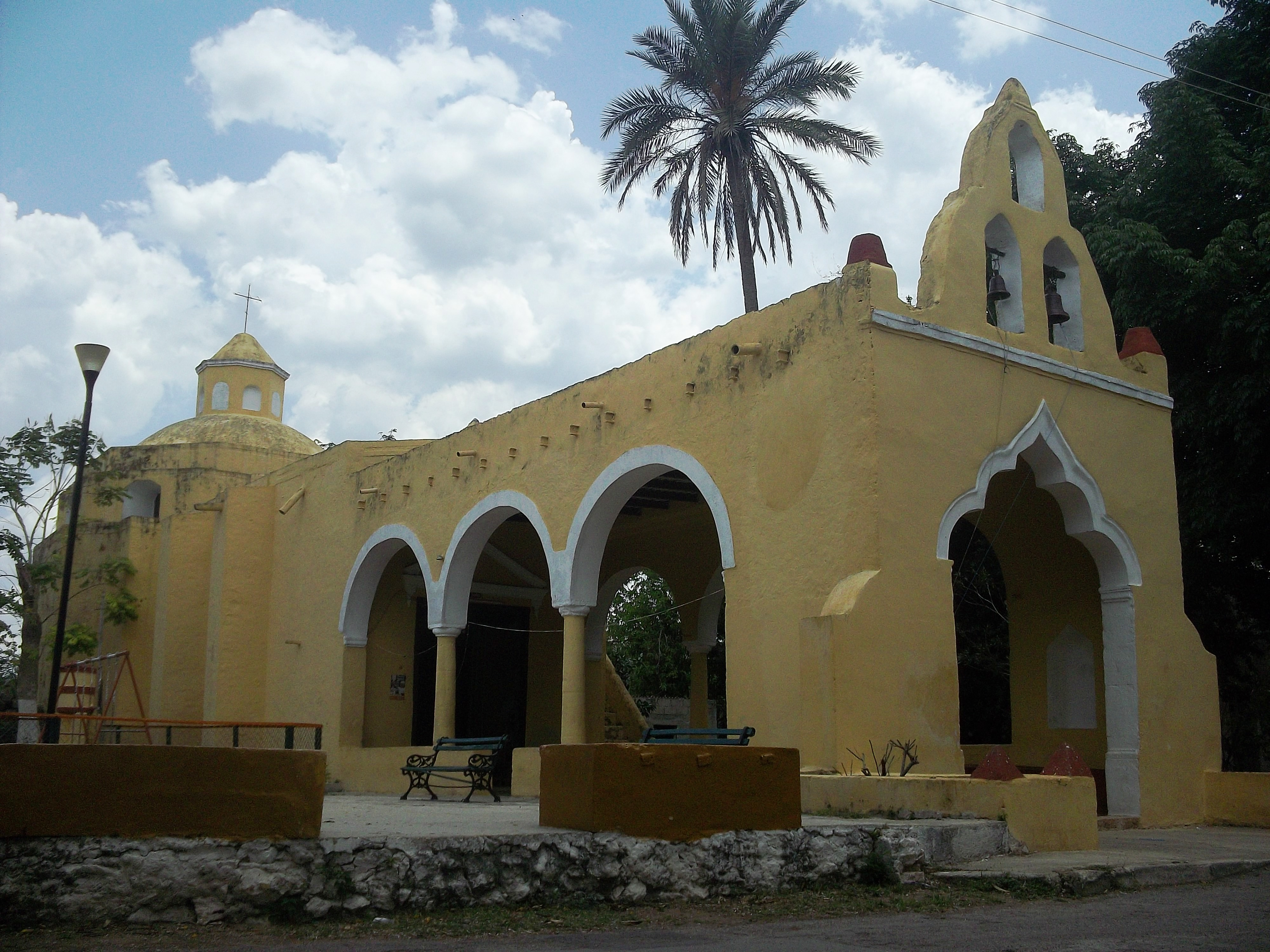
Church at Hacienda San Nicolás Dzoyaxché

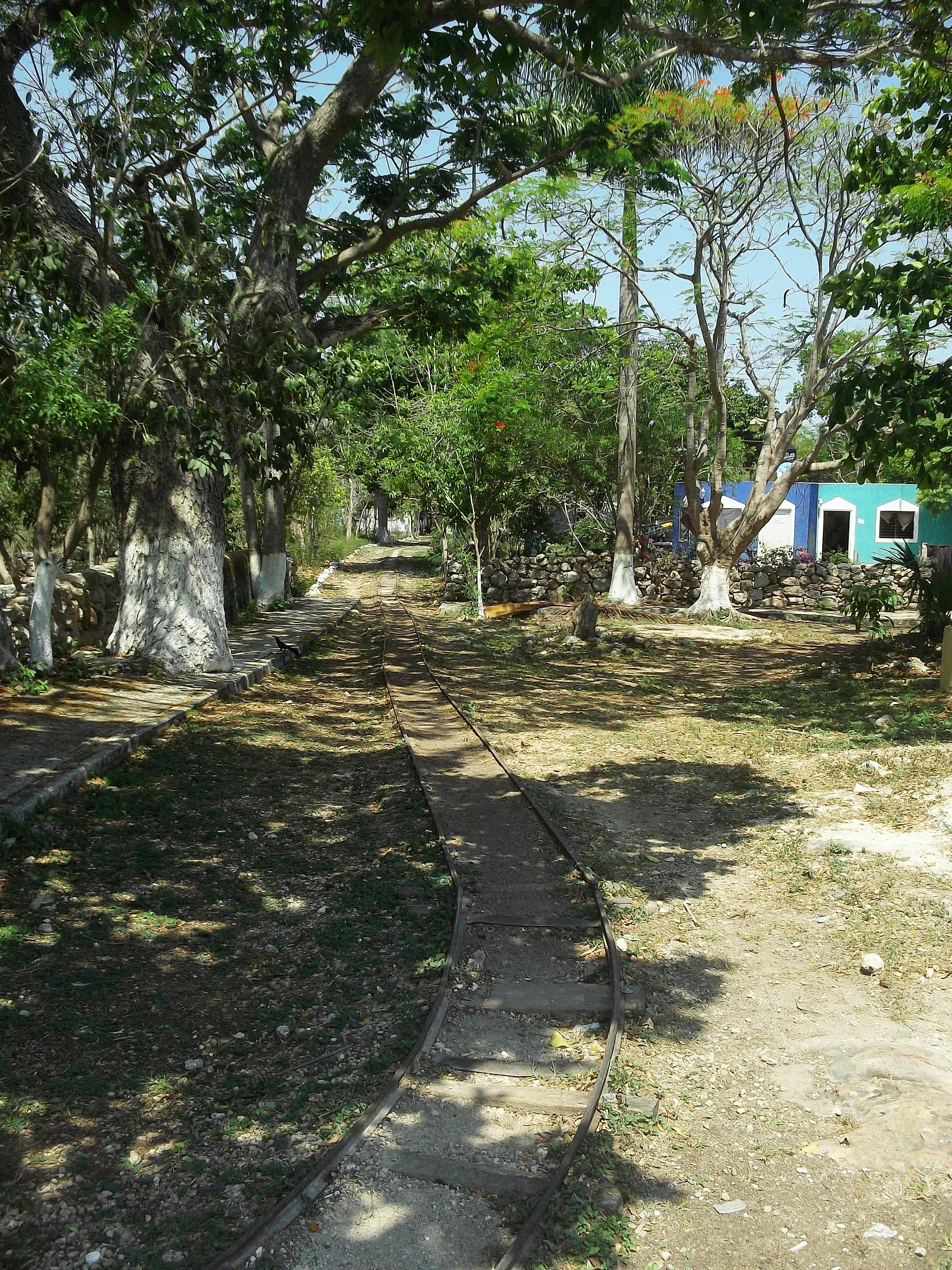
View of Hacienda San Nicolás Dzoyaxché

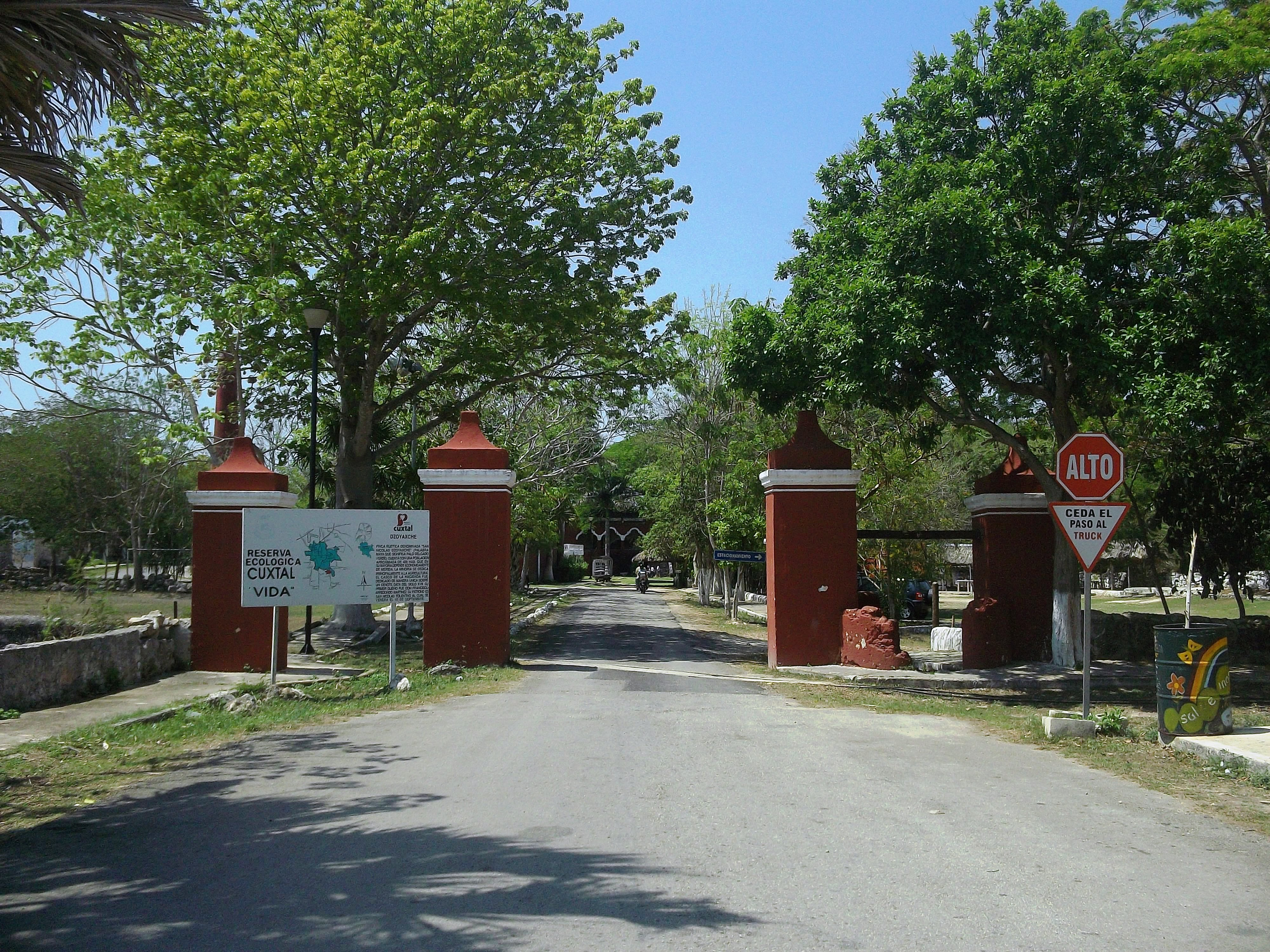
View of Hacienda San Nicolás Dzoyaxché

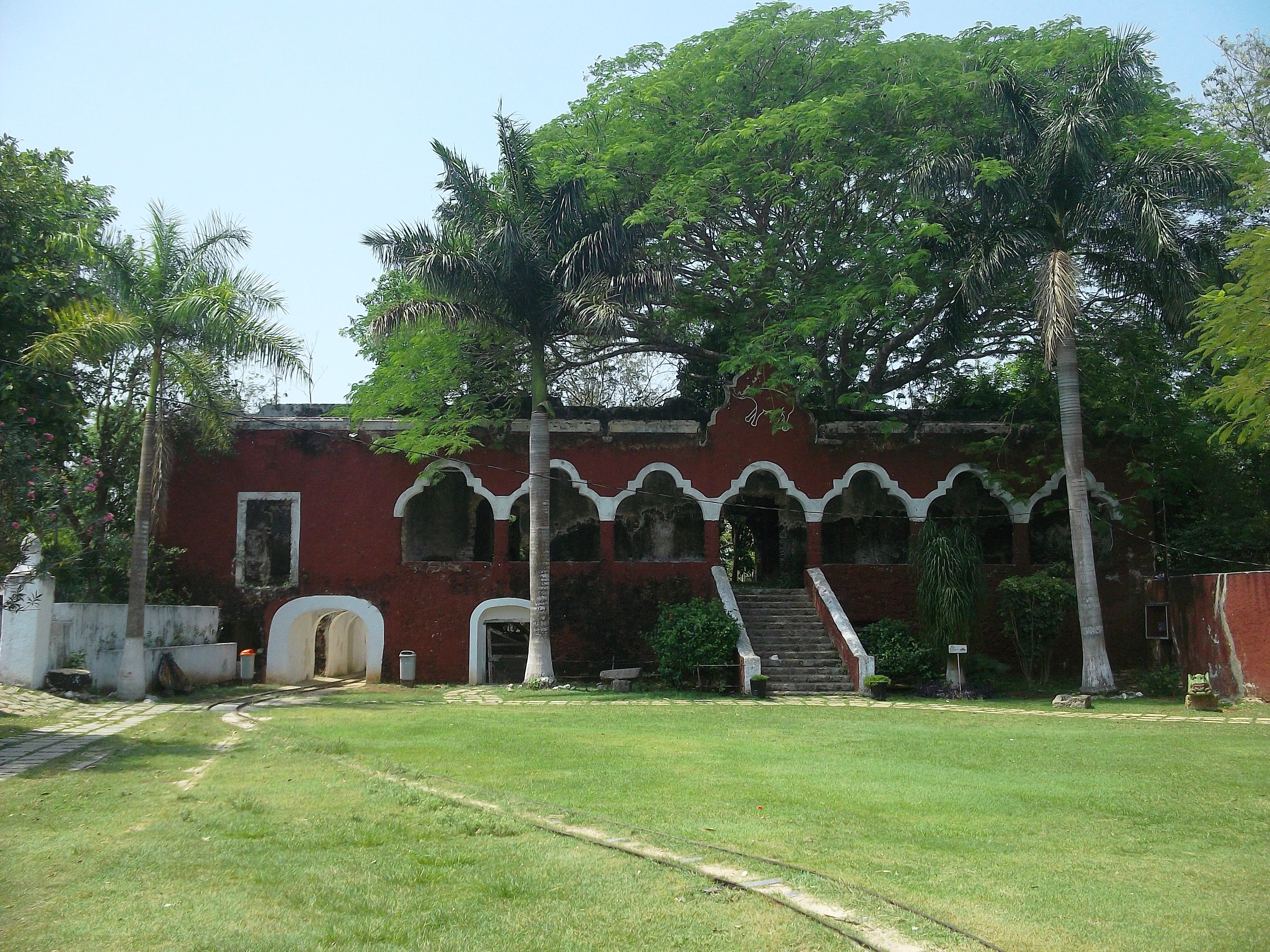
View of Hacienda San Nicolás Dzoyaxché

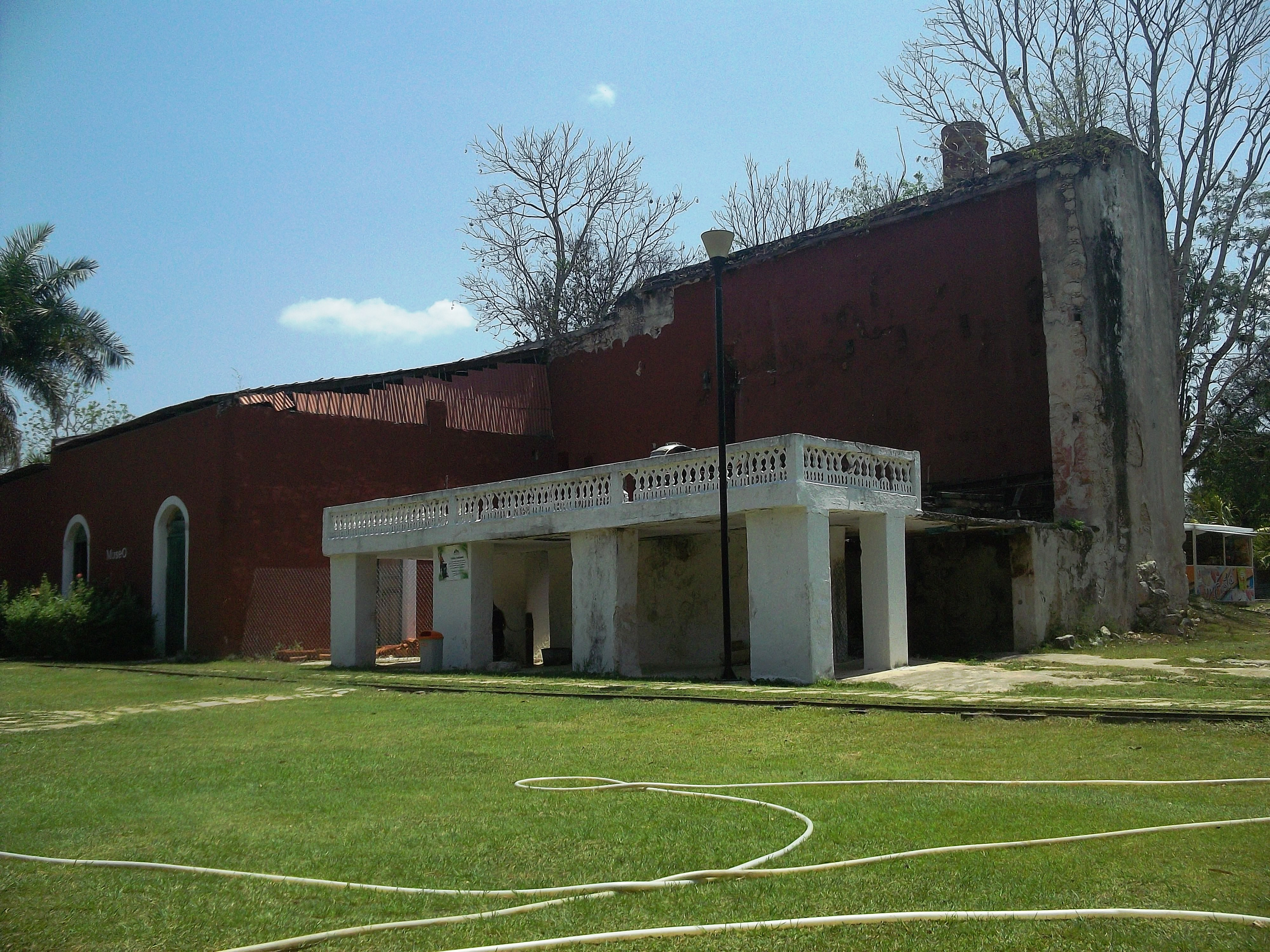
View of Hacienda San Nicolás Dzoyaxché

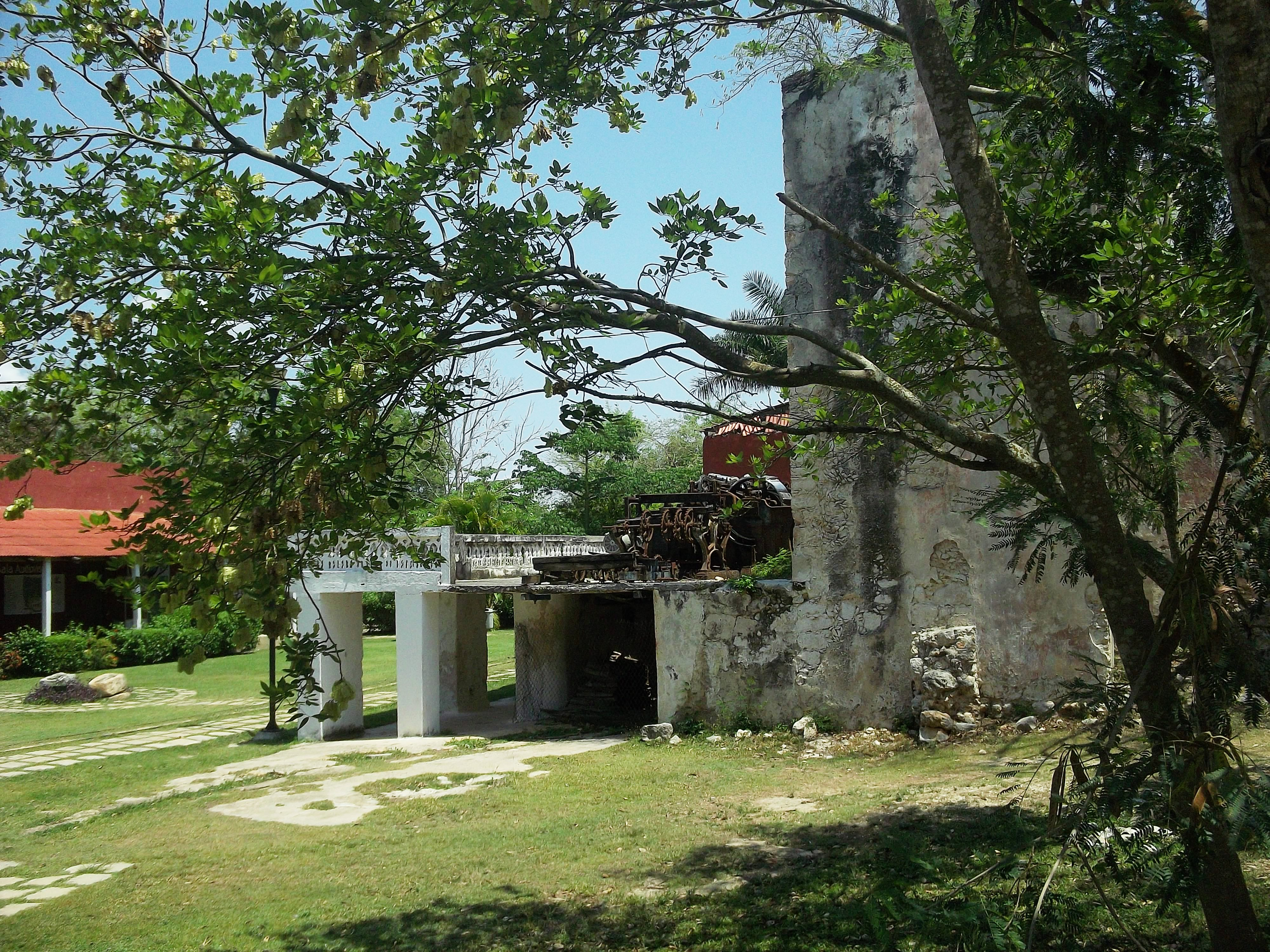
View of Hacienda San Nicolás Dzoyaxché

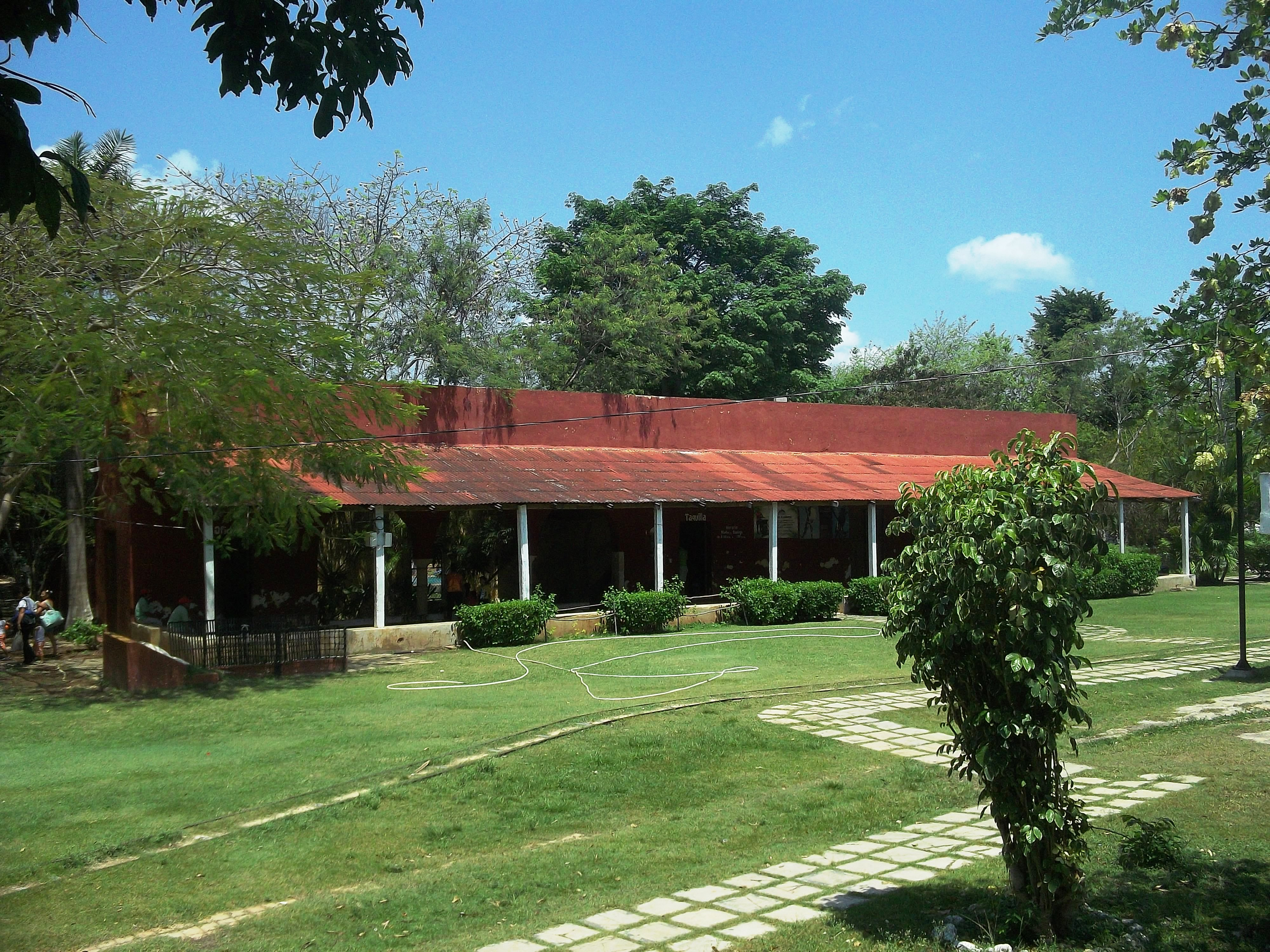
View of Hacienda San Nicolás Dzoyaxché

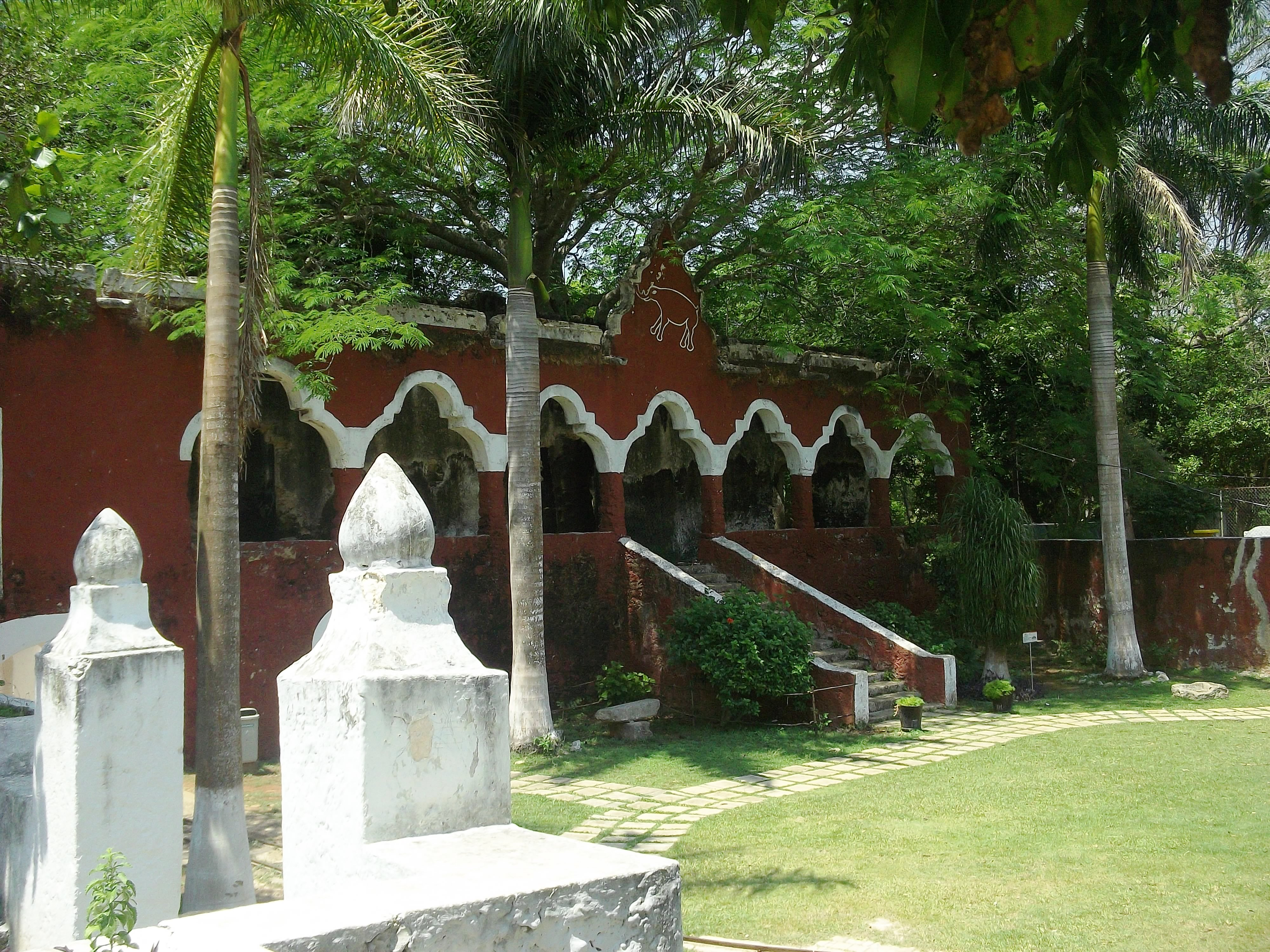
View of Hacienda San Nicolás Dzoyaxché

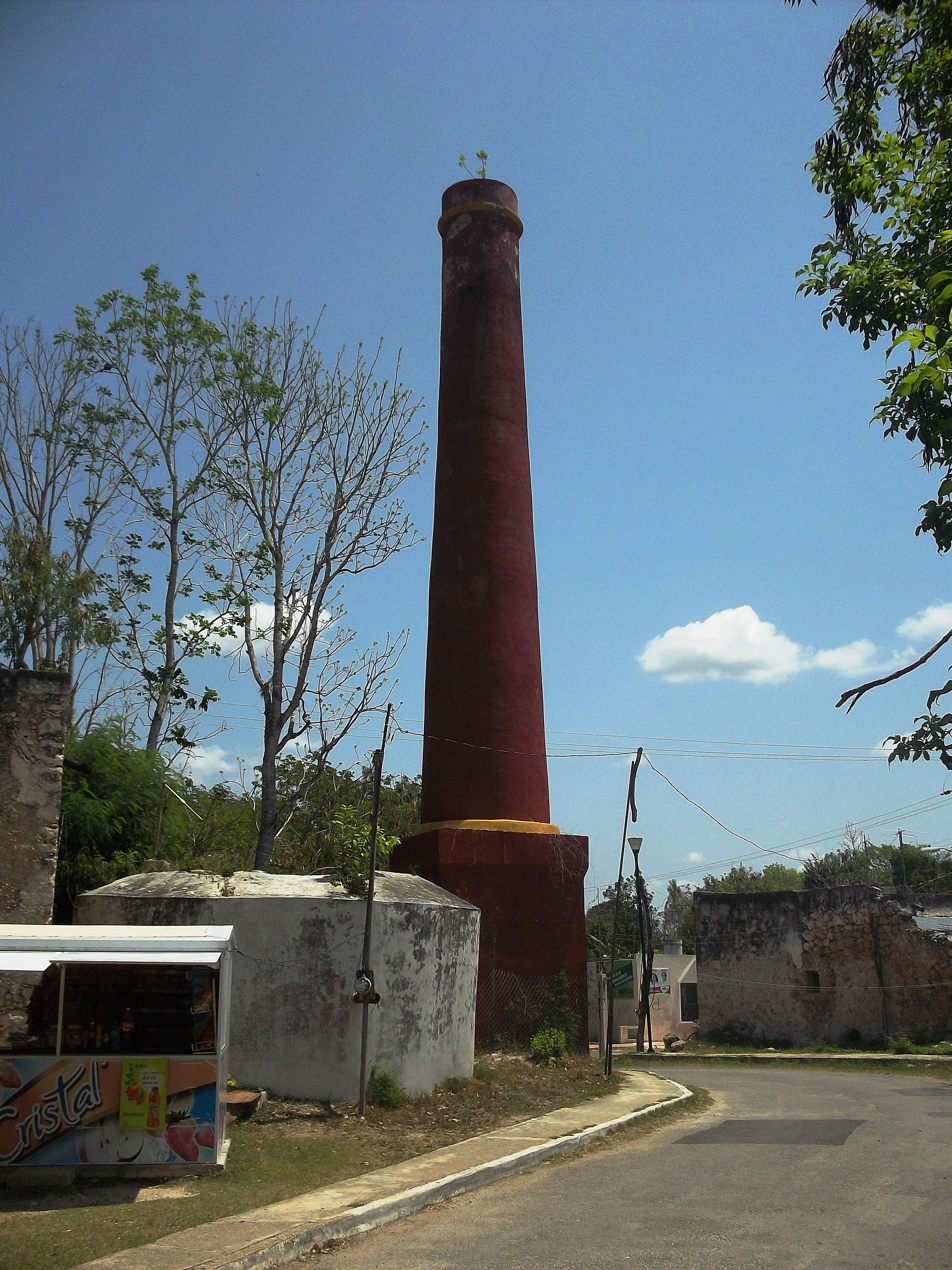
View of Hacienda San Nicolás Dzoyaxché

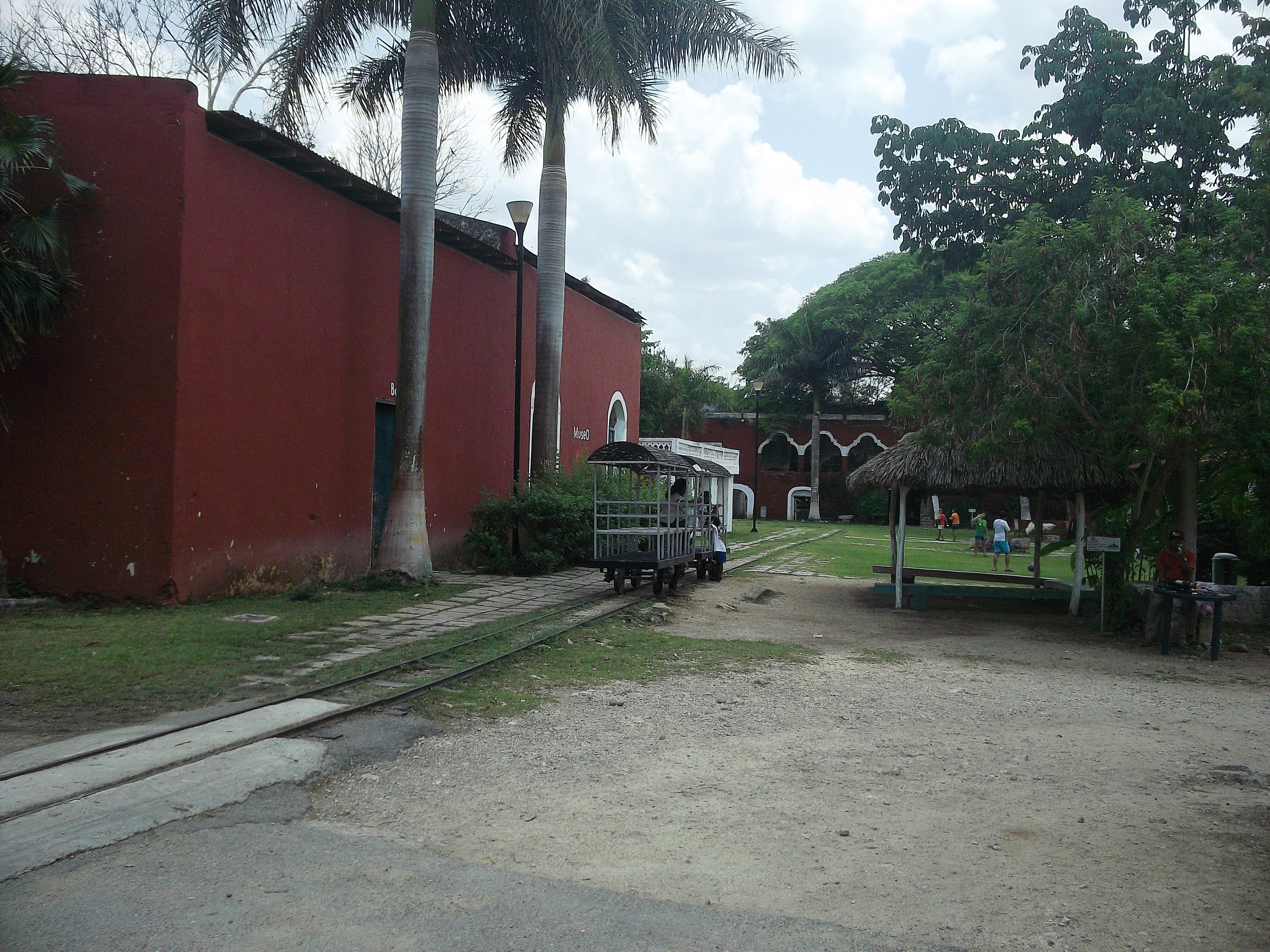
Train at Hacienda San Nicolás Dzoyaxché

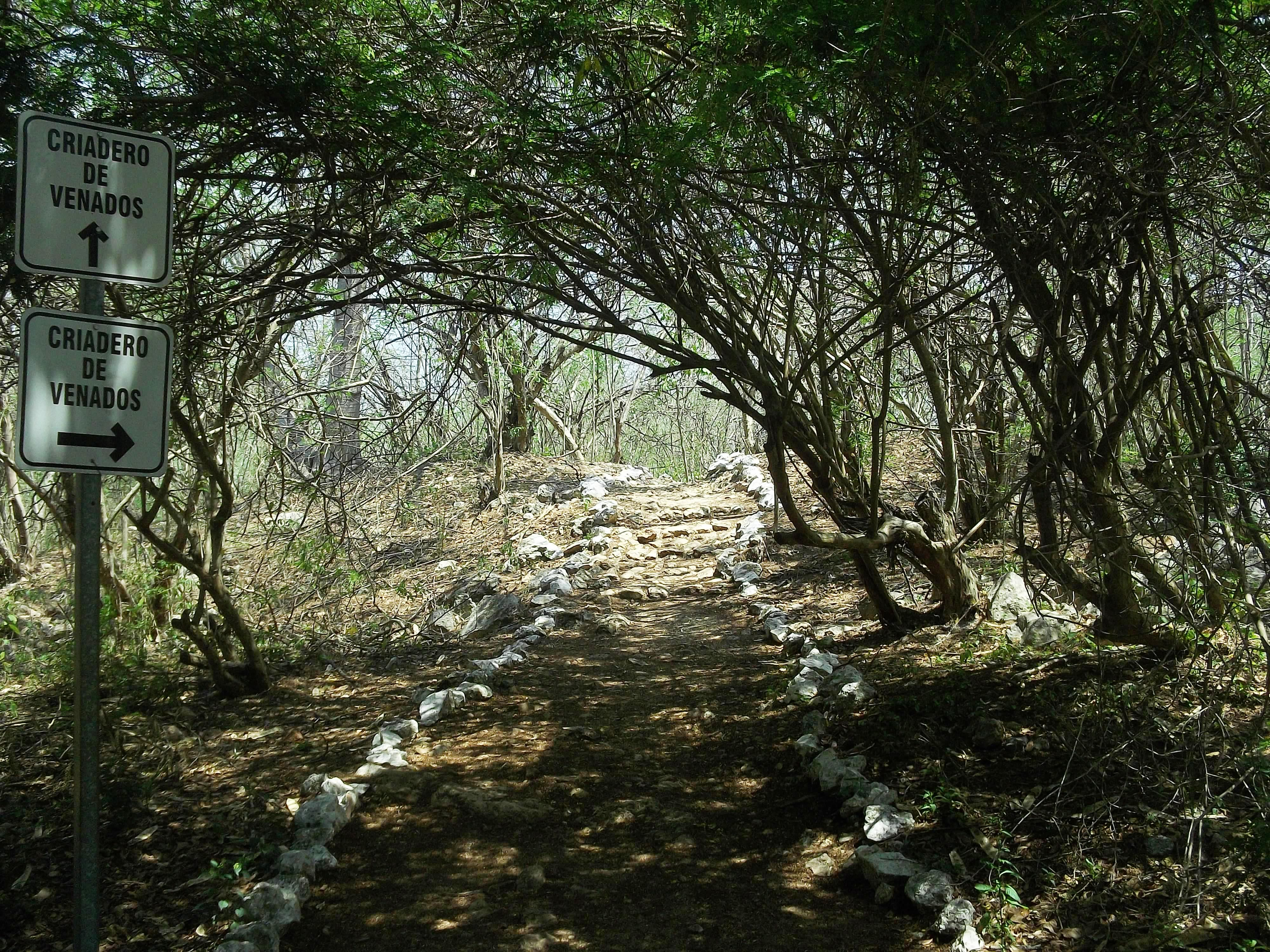
View of Hacienda San Nicolás Dzoyaxché

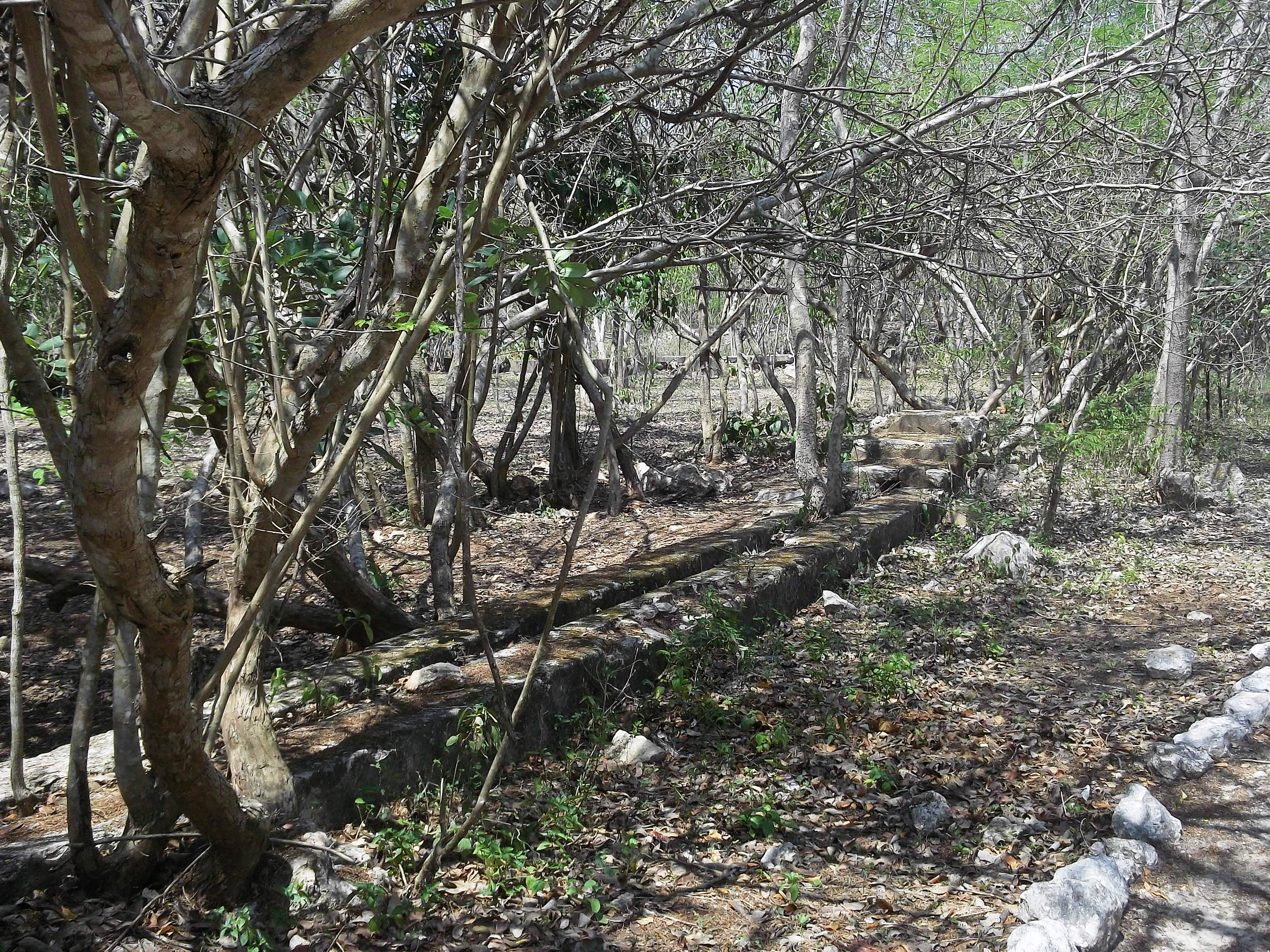
View of Hacienda San Nicolás Dzoyaxché

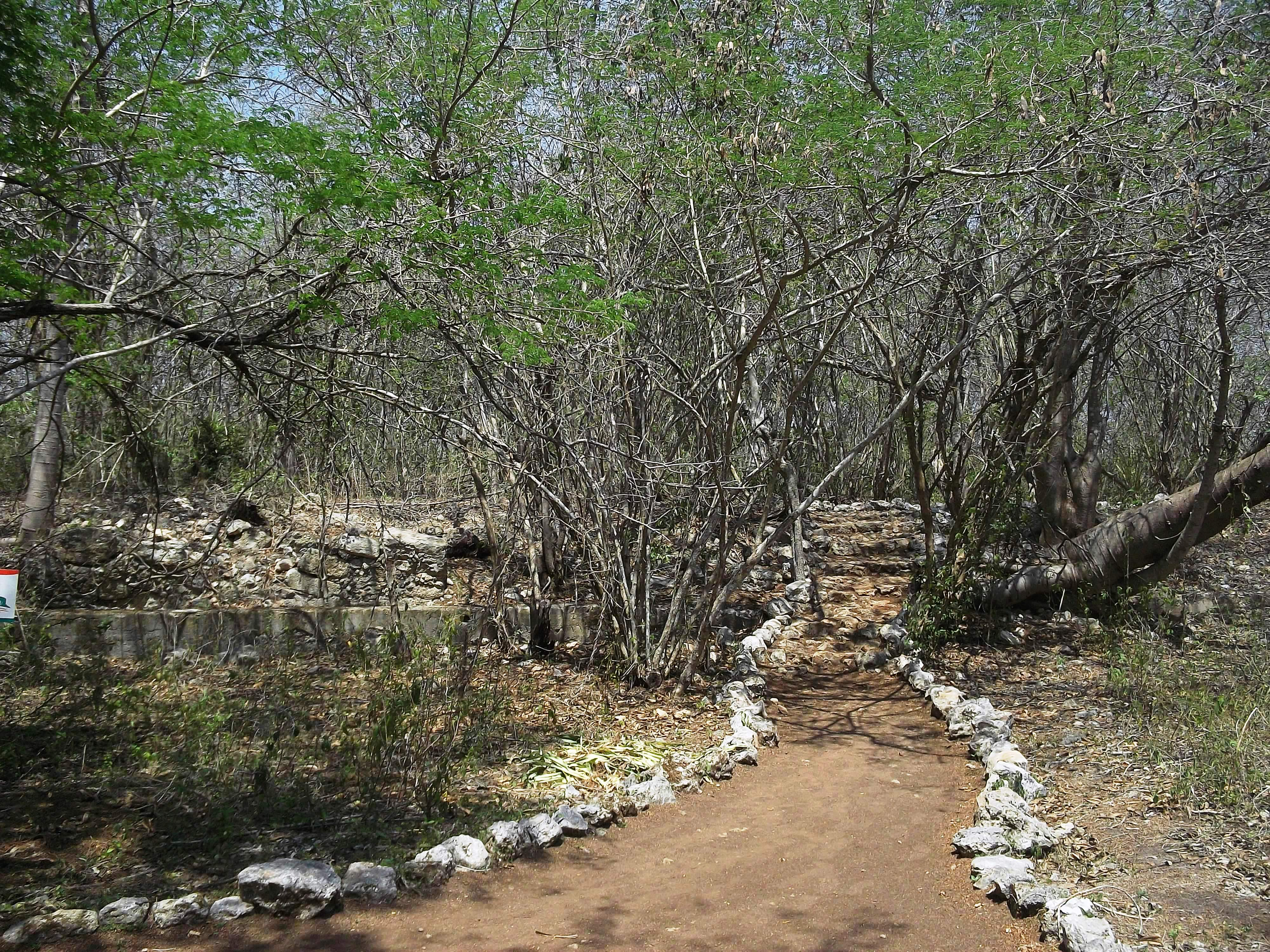
View of Hacienda San Nicolás Dzoyaxché

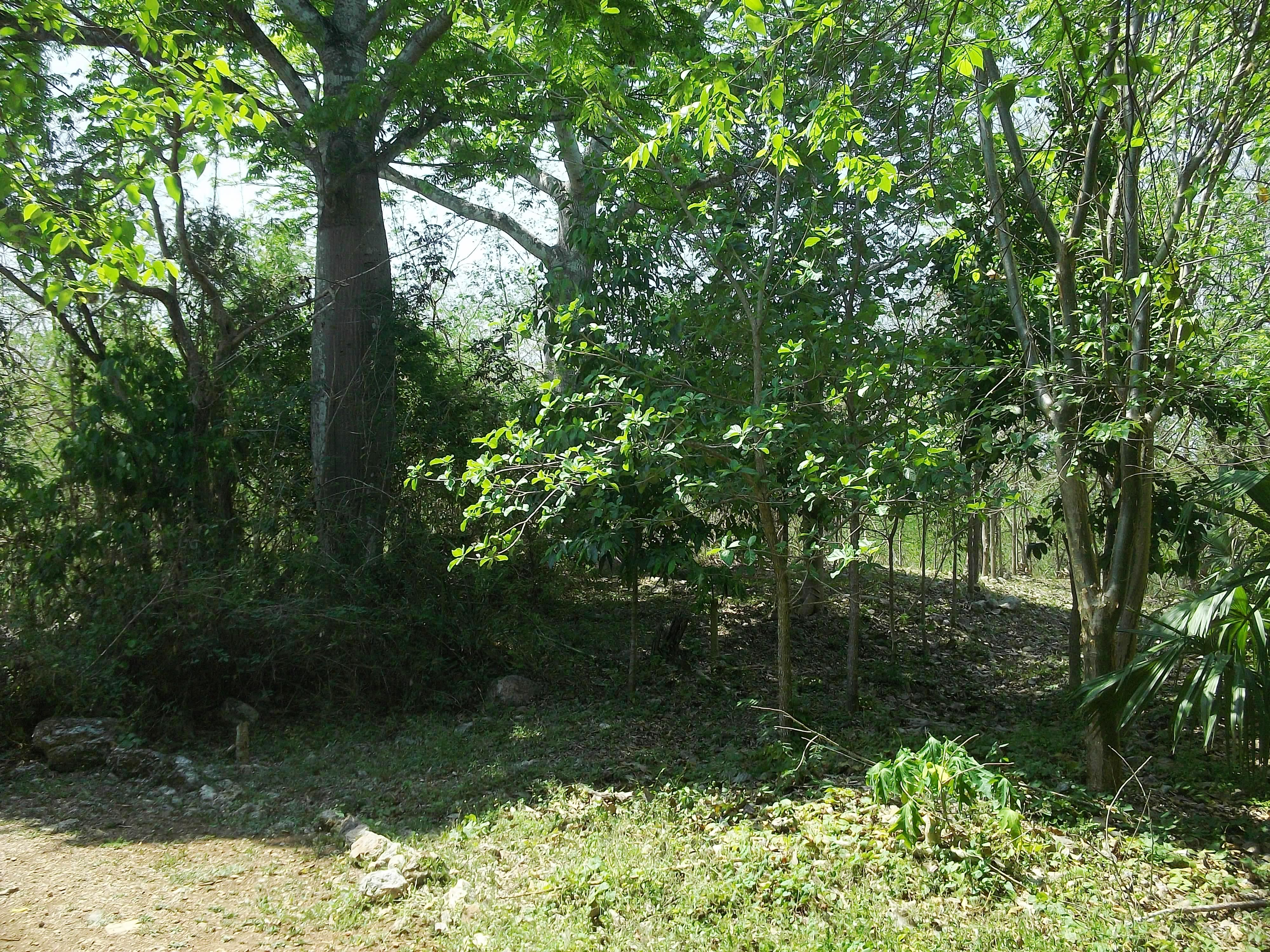
View of Hacienda San Nicolás Dzoyaxché

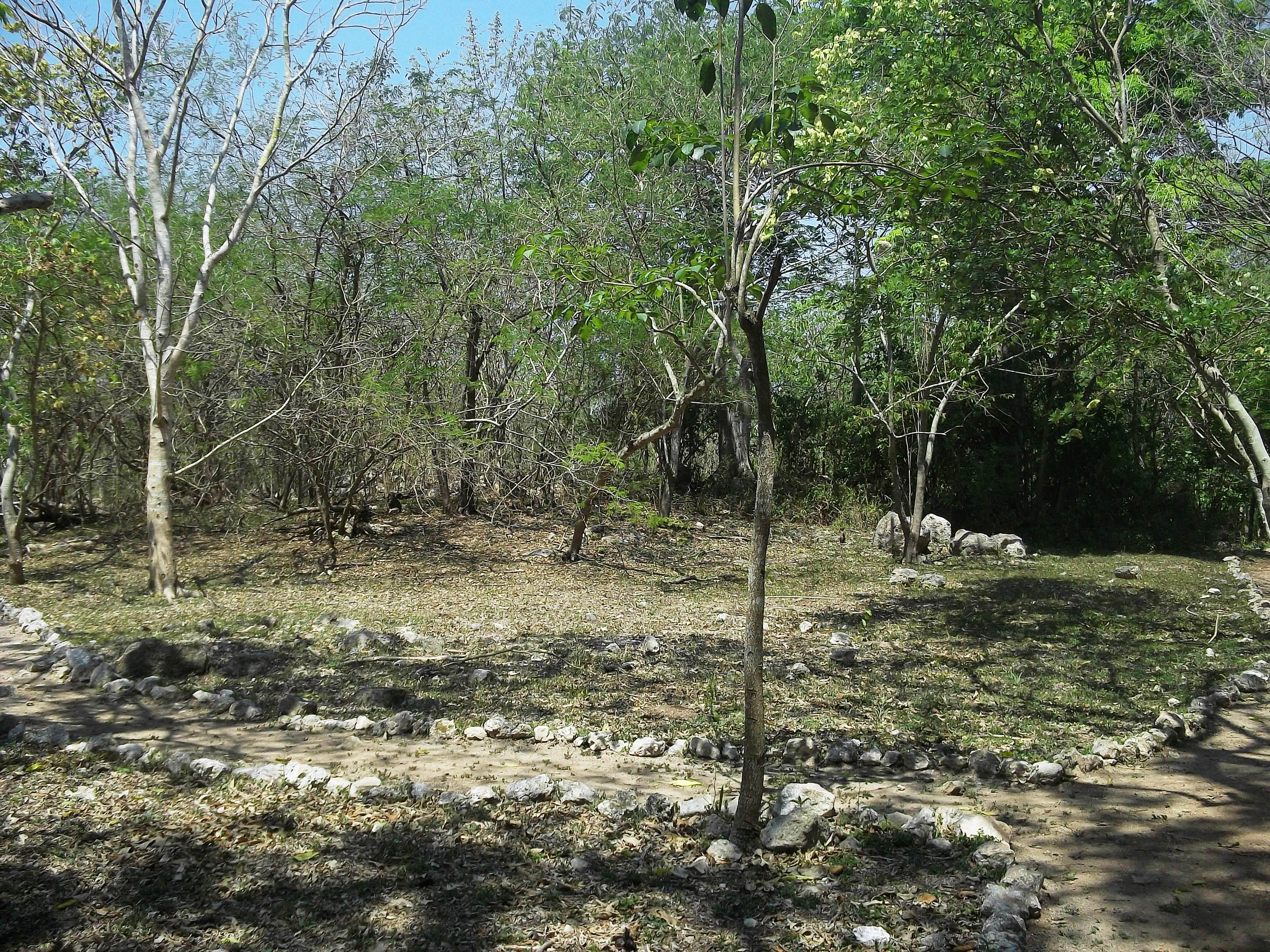
View of Hacienda San Nicolás Dzoyaxché

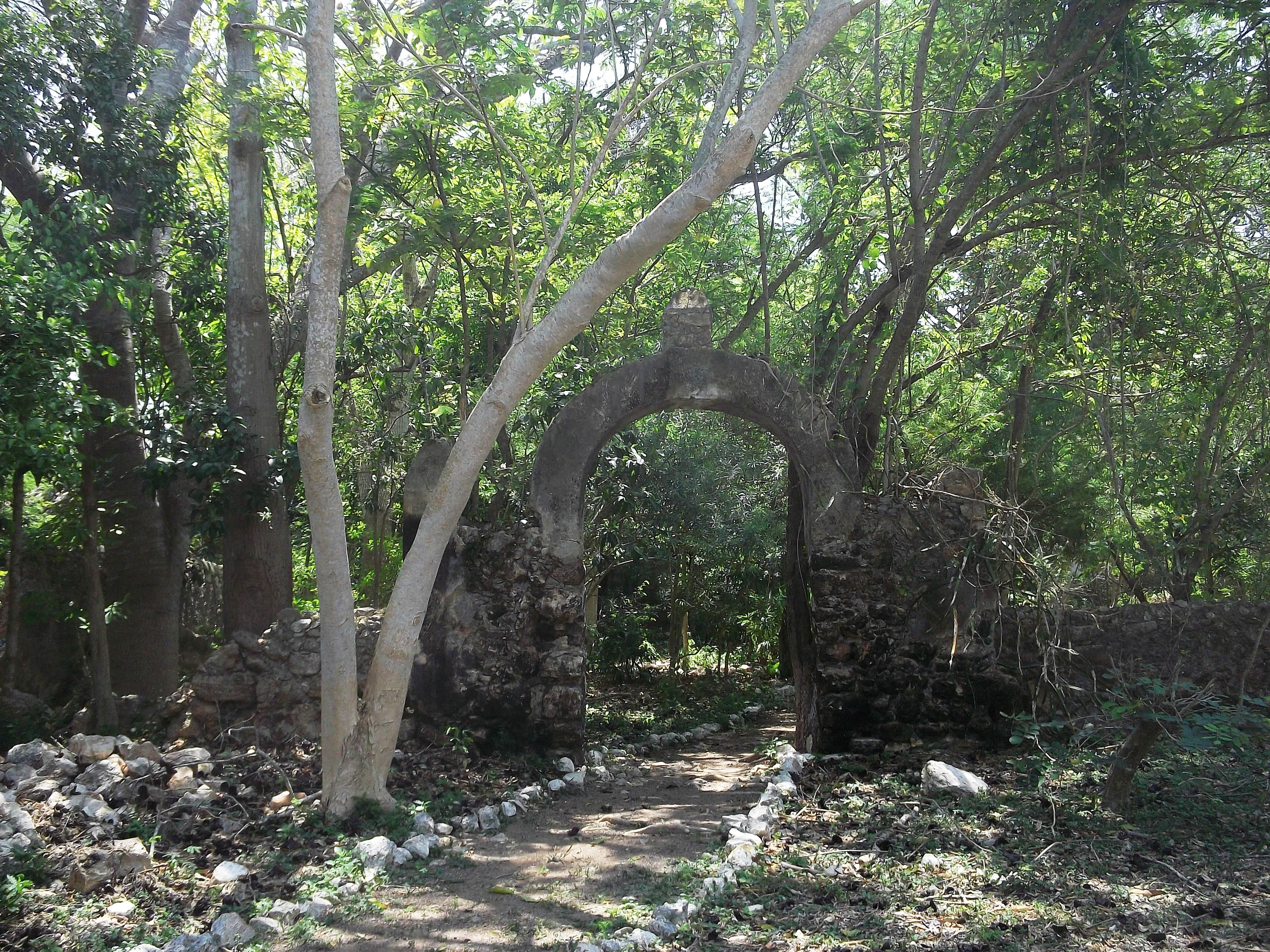
View of Hacienda San Nicolás Dzoyaxché

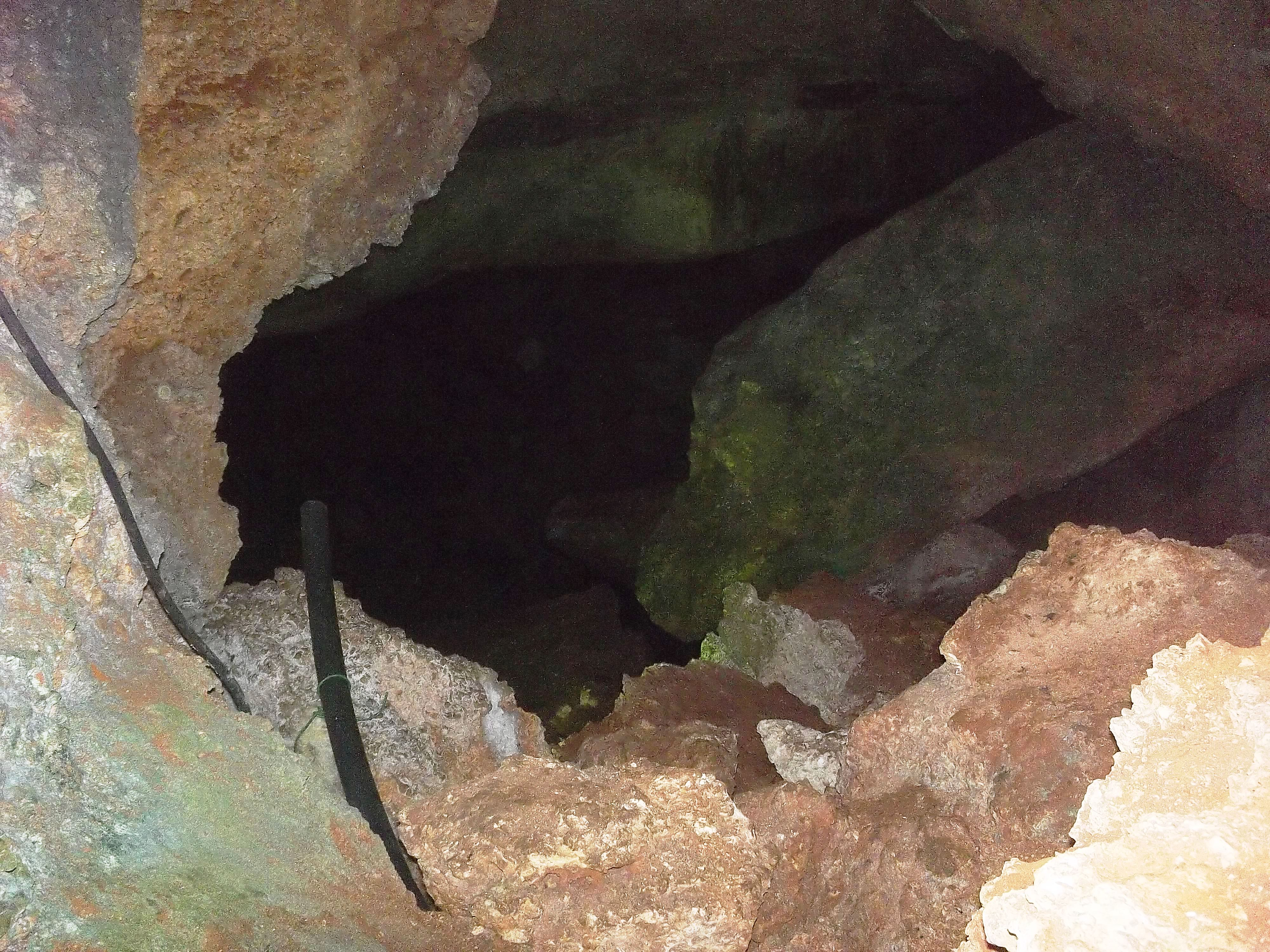
Cenote of Hacienda San Nicolás Dzoyaxché

Transport Decauville of Hacienda San Nicolás Dzoyaxché with horsecars

Transport Decauville of Hacienda San Nicolás Dzoyaxché with horsecars
