= Ismael Moreno Pino =

Mexican lawyer and diplomat

His Excellency Ismael Moreno Pino BVO OMCh OSC OSP
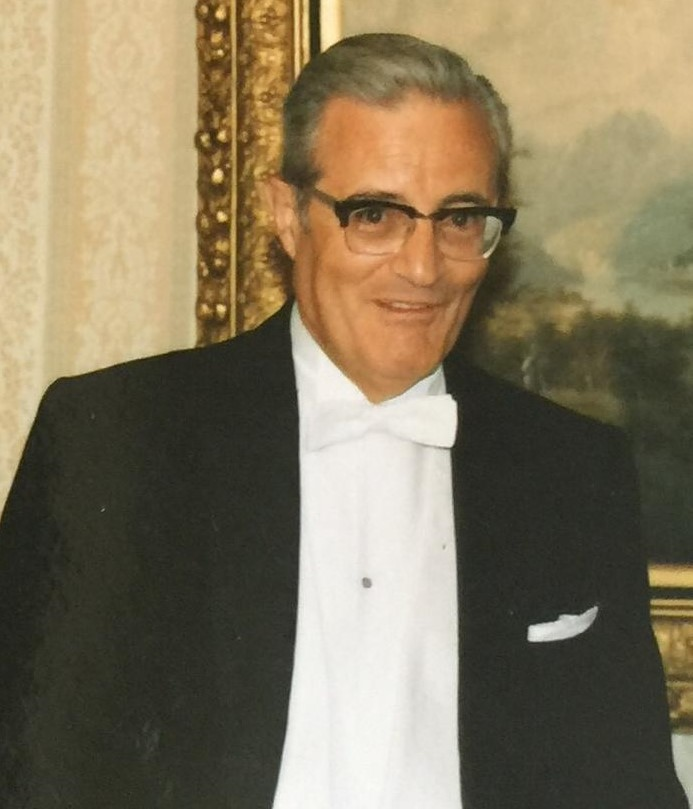

Undersecretary for Foreign Affairs (Multilateral Affairs and Human Rights)
- In office 1964–1965
- President: Adolfo López Mateos; Gustavo Díaz Ordaz

Ambassador of Mexico
- In office 1964–1992
- President: Adolfo López Mateos; Gustavo Díaz Ordaz; Luis Echeverría; José López Portillo; Miguel de la Madrid; Carlos Salinas de Gortari

Personal details
- Born: 15 February 1927 Mérida, Yucatán, Mexico
- Died: 15 August 2013 (aged 86) Mexico City
- Party: Independent
- Spouse: Guadalupe Mercedes González de Hermosillo y Quirós
- Children: 3
- Parent(s): Aida Pino Cámara (mother); Ramón Moreno (father)
- Relatives: Pino Cámara Family; María Cámara Vales (grandmother); José María Pino Suárez (grandfather); Alejandro Lecanda Moreno (grandson)
- Education: American School Foundation; Universidad Nacional Autónoma de México; Georgetown University
- Profession: Lawyer, statesman, diplomat, author
- Awards: List of honours and decorations

Ismael Moreno Pino (15 February 1927 – 15 August 2013) was a Mexican lawyer, diplomat, and author instrumental in negotiating the Tlatelolco Treaty, which established Latin America as the first inhabited region in the planet free of nuclear weapons. He worked alongside Alfonso García Robles, who received the Nobel Peace Prize for their joint efforts. Ambassador of Mexico between 1964 and 1992, he represented his country in Germany, the Netherlands, several Latin American states, and before international organizations, including the Organization of American States in Washington, D.C., and the United Nations in New York City and Geneva, Switzerland. Additionally, he served on the Administrative Council of the Permanent Court of Arbitration in The Hague. His maternal grandfather was José María Pino Suárez, Vice President of Mexico from 1911 until his assassination in 1913 during the Ten Tragic Days, remembered as a martyr in the struggle for democracy and social justice during the Mexican Revolution.

Born in Mérida, Yucatán, into the Pino–Cámara family, he was educated at the American School Foundation in Mexico City. He earned a law degree from the UNAM and later obtained bachelor's and master's degrees in International relations from the School of Foreign Service at Georgetown University. He joined the Foreign Ministry in 1951, working closely with intellectuals such as Octavio Paz. During the early 1960s, he served as Assistant Secretary for International Organization Affairs and Undersecretary for Multilateral Affairs, helping shape Mexico's position on major Cold War events, such as the Cuban Revolution and the Missile Crisis. During his tenure in Chile as ambassador and dean of the diplomatic corps, he observed the historic 1970 presidential election and the difficulties that confronted Salvador Allende which ultimately led to the 1973 coup. As ambassador to West Germany, he played a pivotal role in the historic decision to extend diplomatic recognition to East Germany in January 1973, making Mexico one of the first countries in the Americas to do so, nearly two years before the United States followed suit under the Ford Administration. This move aligned with Willy Brandt's Ostpolitik, strengthening Mexico's autonomous foreign policy during the Cold War.

In 1982 President José López Portillo conferred upon him the title of embajador eminente, a distinction legally reserved for only ten career ambassadors in recognition of their exceptional service. In 1990, he was knighted by Beatrix, Queen of the Netherlands and his work also earned him numerous honors from other foreign governments, including those of Brazil, Chile, Germany, Japan, Peru, the Republic of China, Venezuela, and Yugoslavia. Upon his retirement in 1992, he was recognized as the senior-most diplomat, or doyen, of the Mexican Foreign Service. Among his publications, his book Diplomacy: Theoretical and Practical Aspects became a seminal reference for generations of Latin American diplomats.

== Family origins ==
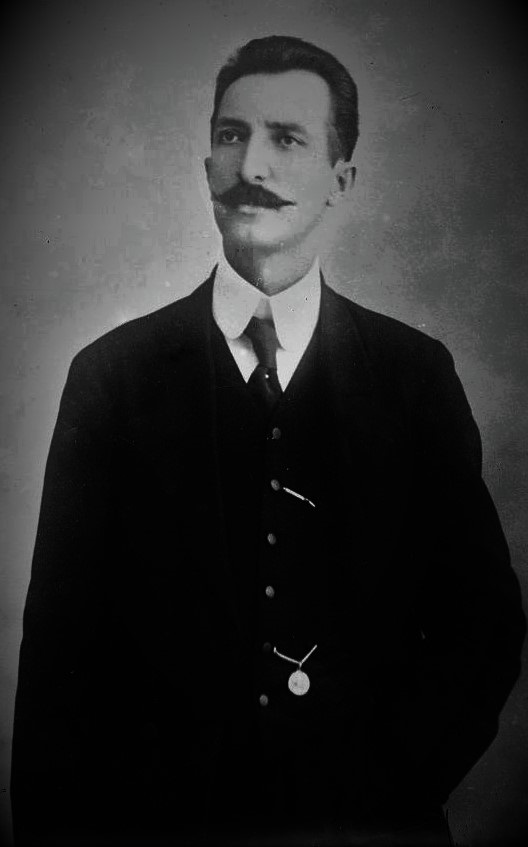
Moreno Pino was the grandson of José María Pino Suárez, Vice-President of Mexico from 1911 until his assassination in 1913, during the Mexican Revolution.

He was born in Mérida, Yucatán on 15 February 1927, the only son of Aída Pino Cámara and Ramón Moreno. His maternal grandparents were José María Pino Suárez, Vice President of Mexico from 1911 until his assassination in 1913, and María Cámara Vales, recipient of the Belisario Domínguez Medal of Honor, one of the highest civil honors that a Mexican citizen can receive.

He descends from the de la Cámara lineage, a distinguished landowning family which settled in the Yucatán peninsula in the 16th century. Their ancestry can be traced back to the early 13th century and they gained recognition in Spain, Portugal, and Yucatán where family members have held positions as knights, explorers, conquerors, aristocrats, landowners, and industrialists. His great-grandfather was Raymundo Cámara Luján, a prominent businessman, while his great-granduncle was Agustín Vales Castillo, an industrialist who served as Mayor of Mérida between 1902 and 1908. Alfredo and Nicolás Cámara Vales who served as Governor of Quintana Roo and Yucatán, respectively, were his great-uncles. He was also related to Eusebio Escalante, the industrialist responsible for developing the henequen industry in Yucatán, José María Ponce, the founder of the Cervecería Yucatán brewery, Carlos Peón, governor of Yucatán, and Alfredo Pino Cámara, the Supreme Court Justice.

In the arts, Hortensia Cámara Vales and Pablo Castellanos León, his great-uncles, were a couple of concert pianists; Castellanos León, a virtuoso, was educated in the conservatoire de Paris under Antoine François Marmontel. His son, Pablo Castellanos Cámara, also became a virtuoso pianist, having studied at the Paris and Berlin Conservatories under Alfred Cortot and Edwin Fischer. Meanwhile, Fernando Cámara Barbachano, another cousin, was a distinguished anthropologist and museum director.

As the grandson of Pino Suárez, he is also a direct line descendant of Pedro Sáinz de Baranda, a Founding Father who, after fighting the Battle of Trafalgar as a Spanish Naval Officer, founded the Mexican Navy during the Mexican War of Independence; later in his career, he served as Governor of Yucatán and is widely regarded for having introduced the Industrial Revolution to the country. Other prominent members of the Sáinz de Baranda family include the brothers Pedro Baranda and Joaquín Baranda, as well as Pedro Sainz de Baranda who served as mayor of Madrid during the Napoleonic invasion of Iberia.

== Education ==
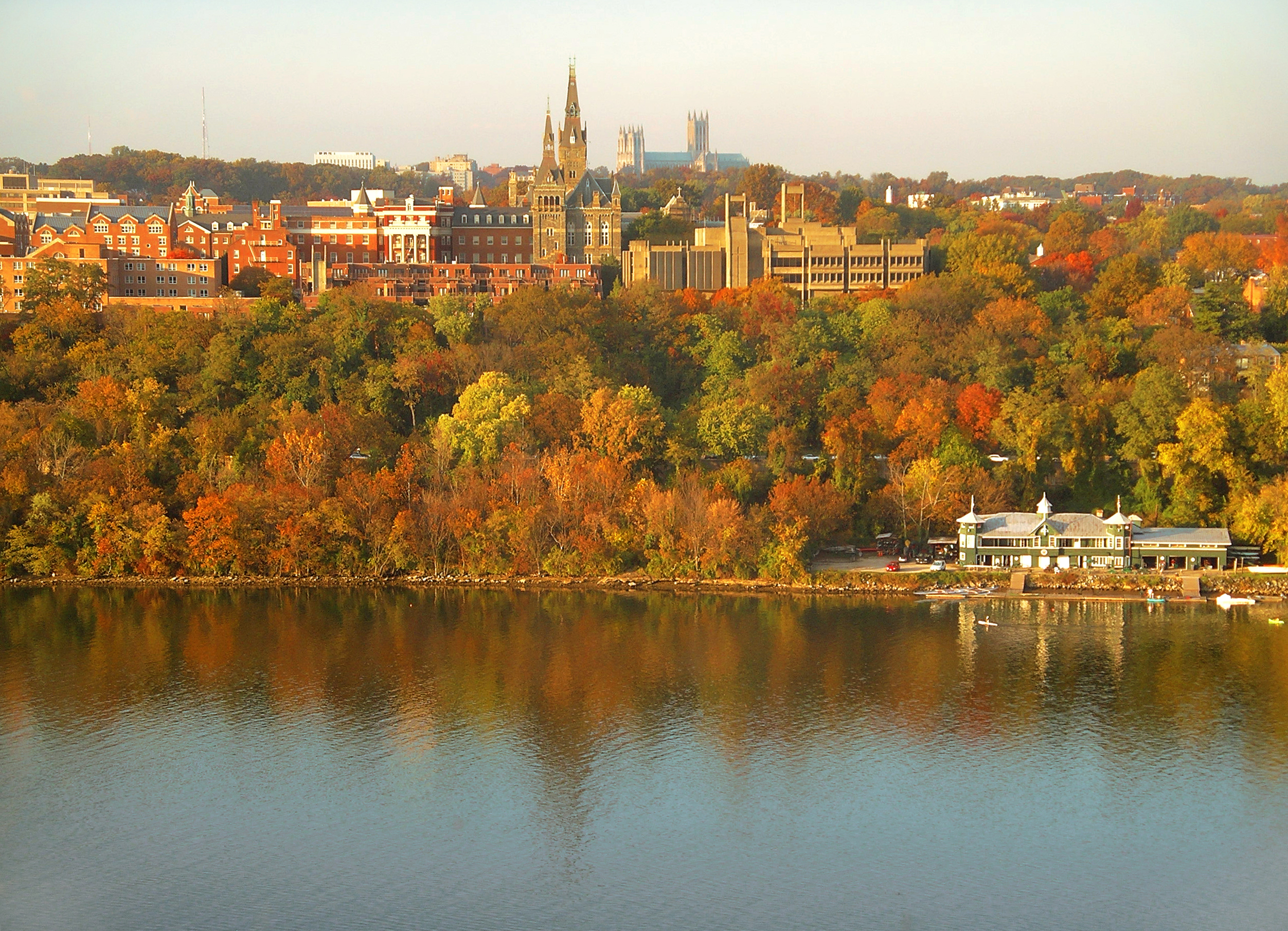
An alumnus of Georgetown University in Washington, D.C., later, Moreno Pino was a lecturer of international law.

Educated at the American School, he received his Law degree from the National University of Mexico in 1950, writing a thesis on "the role of the consular corps in the national economic recovery plan", a copy of which can still be obtained in the U.S. Library of Congress.

He continued his studies at the School of Foreign Service at Georgetown University in Washington, D.C., obtaining bachelor's and master's degrees in Foreign Service. His roommate at Georgetown was Frank V. Ortiz, who would later serve as U.S. Ambassador to Argentina and Peru.

== Diplomatic career ==
=== Early career: the Foreign Ministry and Mexico's response to the Cold War ===
A protégé of Manuel Tello, then the Foreign Secretary, Moreno Pino joined the Foreign Office in 1951 and the Diplomatic service in 1955, after passing the necessary examinations. Originally, he was hired as a legal advisor to the Mexican delegation to the Organization of American States in Washington, D.C.

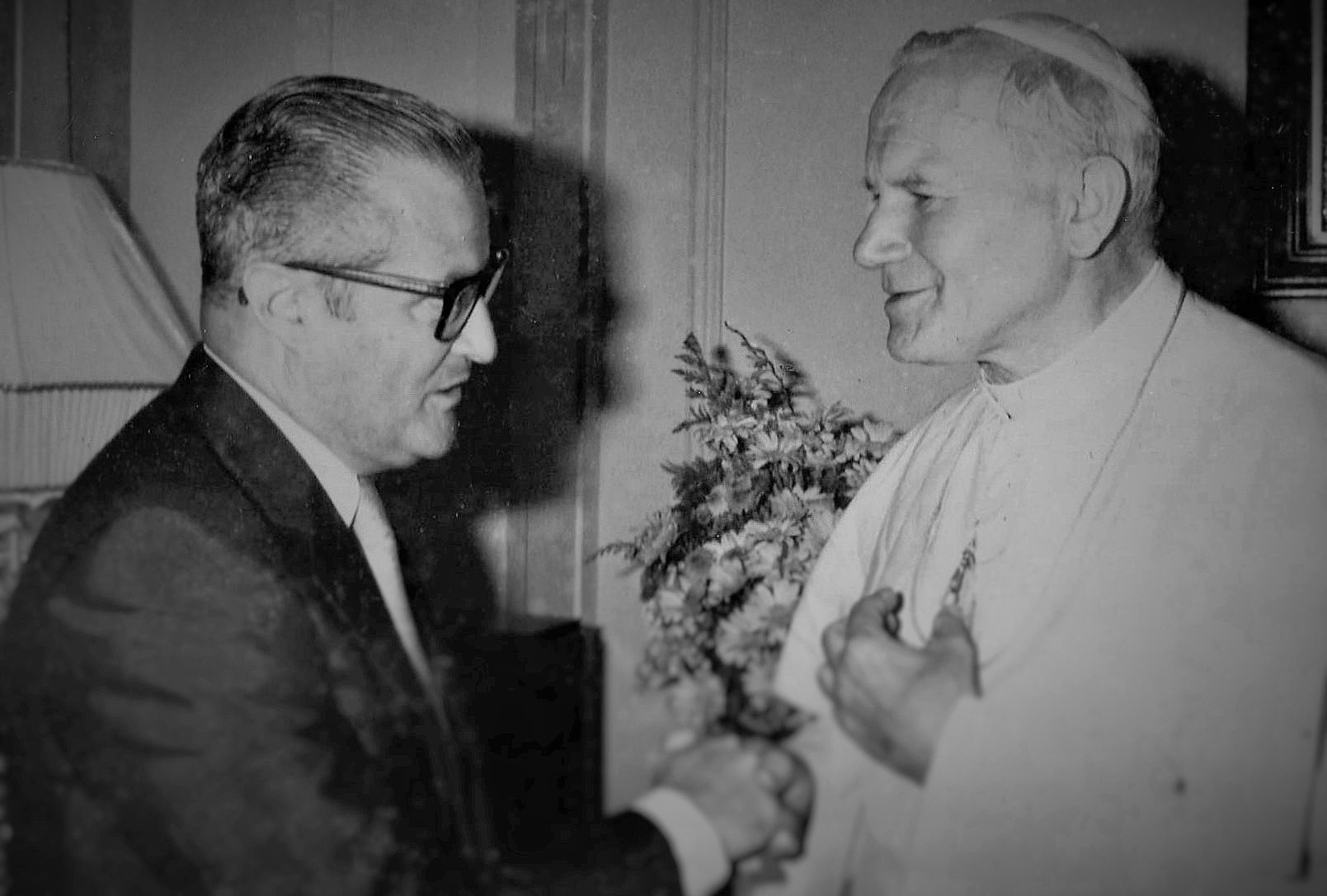
Moreno Pino (left) with Pope John Paul II (right).

Returning to Mexico, he worked in the Bureau for International Organization Affairs, collaborating closely with Octavio Paz, who would be awarded the Nobel Prize in Literature in 1990, and with Jorge Castañeda, who would serve as Foreign Secretary. In 1960, succeeding the latter, he served as Assistant Secretary for International Organization Affairs. Between 1964 and 1965, he served as Undersecretary for Multilateral Affairs. In 1964, President Adolfo López Mateos appointed him to the rank of Ambassador of Mexico.

As a non-aligned country in a Cold War context, Mexico was treading a fine line between the Western Bloc, led by the United States, and the Warsaw Pact countries, led by the USSR. This was exacerbated after Fidel Castro came to power in Cuba in 1959, providing no easy solutions for Mexican foreign policy: "wholehearted support for the Cuban Revolution would create an unsustainable tension with the United States, the business community and the Catholic Church; meanwhile, wholehearted support for the United States would provoke an unsustainable tension with the revolutionary government of Cuba, the Mexican intelligentsia and other left-wing sectors which could become radicalized. The Mexican political system entrusted this delicate mission to the Foreign Ministry headed at that time by Manuel Tello, Foreign Secretary, and José Gorostiza, Deputy Foreign Secretary and, next to them, a noteworthy cadre of career diplomats educated in a tradition that [dates back] to the times when the proverb 'a Texan might beat a Mexican in a fight, but he is lost if he tries to argue with him' was minted."

Moreno Pino actively participated in shaping Mexico's response to the Cuban Revolution and its aftermath, including the Bay of Pigs Invasion (1961) and the Cuban Missile Crisis (1962). Indeed, Moreno Pino was one of the key Mexican delegates in the Punta del Este meeting (1962) held after the Cuban Revolution, during which it was decided, contrary to the express wishes of the United States, not to expel Cuba from the Organization of American States (OAS). During the meeting, Secretary Tello declared that Cuba's communist ideology was incompatible with OAS membership (pleasing the US); nevertheless, Mexico argued that the OAS Charter had no provision for the expulsion of a member state (pleasing Cuba). Mexico also advocated for non-interventionism, as established in the Estrada Doctrine.

During these crises, Mexico successfully maintained close relations both with the United States and Cuba. In June 1962, President John F. Kennedy carried out a state visit to Mexico and Moreno Pino was invited to act as interpreter. During the visit, Kennedy "recognized that the fundamental goals of the Mexican Revolution were the same as those of the Alliance for Progress: social justice and economic progress in a framework of individual and political liberty." On the other hand, Fidel Castro extended his recognition "to Mexico, to the Mexican government that has maintained the strongest position, we can say that it inspires us with respect, that with the Mexican government we are willing to talk and discuss, and... we are willing to commit ourselves to maintaining a policy subject to norms, inviolable norms of respect for the sovereignty of each country and of not interfering in the internal affairs of any country."

Another sensitive issue at the time was the representation of China in the United Nations; this issue was particularly delicate because China had a permanent seat in the UN Security Council. After the Chinese Communist Revolution, the Chinese Communist Party led by Mao Zedong had established the People's Republic of China (PRC) while Chiang Kai-shek and his followers took refuge in Taiwan, continuing the regime of the Republic of China. During the first two decades of the Cold War, the latter was known as "Nationalist China", while the former was known as "Communist China" (Two Chinas). Despite Mao's triumph, most Western countries, including Mexico, continued to recognize "Nationalist China". During these years, the question of which of the two had the right to be China's legitimate representative before the UN was one of the biggest headaches for multilateral diplomacy. Between 1949 and 1971, Taiwan continued to represent China in the United Nations to the chagrin of the Soviet bloc.

In December 1961, while serving as Assistant Secretary for International Organization Affairs, responsible for supervising Mexico's relations with the United Nations, Moreno Pino persuaded Secretary Tello to instruct Ambassador Luis Padilla Nervo, then Mexico's Permanent Representative to the UN, to vote in favor of United Nations General Assembly Resolution 1668, which, proposed by the United States, established that any proposal that tried to change the representation of China in the UN required a supermajority of votes in the UN General Assembly. This resolution delayed the accession of Communist China to the UN for a decade, until, in 1971, United Nations General Assembly Resolution 2758 was passed, recognizing the PRC as "China's sole legitimate representative to the United Nations."

=== Negotiation of the Treaty of Tlatelolco: denuclearization in Latin America ===
After the Cuban Missile Crisis in 1962, it became obvious to Latin American and Caribbean countries that they had to protect themselves in the case of a nuclear conflict between the United States and the Soviet Union.

President Adolfo López Mateos, "who extended Mexico's diplomatic networks beyond their traditional limits and devoted significant effort to promoting Latin American integration", promoted denuclearization in the region. Indeed, Mexico had been at the forefront of the efforts to denuclearize Latin America; as early as 22 March 1962, Manuel Tello, then the Foreign Secretary, made a unilateral declaration before the United Nations Conference on Disarmament held in Geneva, Switzerland, establishing that Mexico would be free of nuclear weapons.

By 1963, Mexico sought backing in creating a nuclear-free zone in Latin America from presidents Victor Paz Estenssoro (Bolivia), Joao Goulart (Brazil), Jorge Alessandri (Chile) and Carlos Julio Arosemena (Ecuador). Reflecting on Mexico's leadership during the negotiations, Alfonso García Robles noted that: "the prohibition of nuclear weapons in Latin America constitutes, in effect, an undertaking to which Mexico has had the privilege of making a contribution of extraordinary value."

The chief negotiators appointed by Mexico to guide these negotiations included three important diplomats:

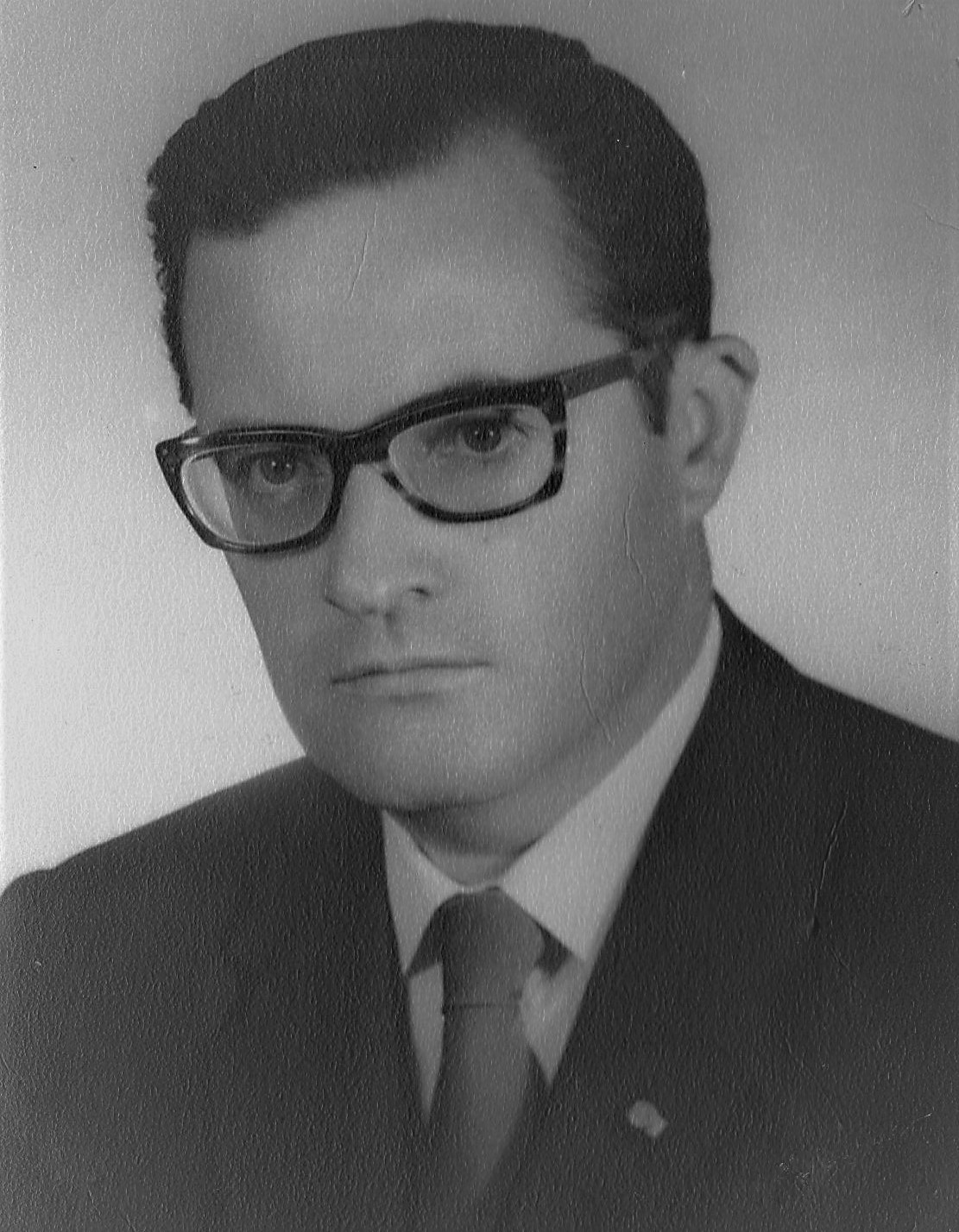
Ismael Moreno Pino, Ambassador of Mexico, photographed around 1967.

The minutes of the negotiations reveal the names of diplomats of enormous stature: Alfonso García Robles, a distinguished jurist and promoter of the treaty, who served as Secretary of Foreign Affairs of Mexico and won the Nobel Peace Prize in 1982 for his role in negotiating the treaty [...] Jorge Castañeda y Álvarez de la Rosa, an international jurist who later would later serve as Secretary of Foreign Affairs, and, finally, Ismael Moreno Pino, a staunch defender of multilateralism in Mexico who served as Ambassador in the European capitals and in the United Nations. That brilliant generation was replicated in the quality of the delegations of other countries present in Tlatelolco.

— Alejandro Alday González, director general of the Mexican Foreign Ministry's Matías Romero Institute

The Preliminary Meeting on the Denuclearization of Latin America (REUPRAL) gathered thirteen nations and created the "Preparatory Commission for the Denuclearization of Latin America", (COPREDAL). The United Nations General Assembly authorized COPREDAL on 27 November 1963 and the negotiations began in November 1964 and were carried out in four sessions until the Treaty was finally signed in February 1967.

Alfonso García Robles, then Undersecretary for Foreign Affairs, was appointed as the permanent representative to CORPREDAL. Moreno Pino, then the Undersecretary for Multilateral Affairs, was originally appointed as the Alternate Representative. However, as García Robles was appointed as the Chairman of COPREDAL, Moreno Pino had to take his place and represent Mexico's interests throughout the negotiations. He continued in this role even as he was appointed Ambassador of Mexico to Chile.

During the inauguration in November 1964, Moreno Pino delivered the keynote address to the representatives of the countries gathered in Mexico City. In his speech, he remarked that even though Mexico was undergoing a presidential transition, Gustavo Díaz Ordaz, then the President-elect, was as committed as his predecessor in supporting the cause of denuclearization. He stated his opposition to the nuclear arms race, noting that the believed such a race was "dangerous as it could degenerate into war." Finally, he mentioned that the competition between the Great Powers for supremacy in their nuclear arsenals had "diverted economic resources that should be used to satisfy the most pressing needs of the people."

The Treaty for the Prohibition of Nuclear Weapons in Latin America and the Caribbean (commonly referred to as the Treaty of Tlatelolco) was signed in the Foreign Ministry in Mexico City on 14 February 1967. It entered into force two years later on 22 April 1969. Cuba was the last country to ratify the Treaty on 23 October 2002. The treaty is now signed and ratified by all 33 nations of Latin America and the Caribbean. It established a nuclear-weapon-free zone throughout Latin America and the Caribbean, thus becoming the first inhabited nuclear-free zone in the world. "Its historical significance is unquestionable. From its intellectual conception to its signature, the most distinguished minds from the American continent participated in its formulation, faithfully representing a generation anguished by the horrors of two world wars and the threat of a third one [...] incessantly seeking peace and harmony among nations."

Moreno Pino, himself, later wrote:

Nuclear-Weapon-Free Zones NW states Nuclear sharing NPT only

Concluded in the midst of the cold war, its genesis and subsequent development required a long, tenacious and patient series of negotiations that finally culminated in what U Thant, the Secretary General of the United Nations, described as "an event of historical significance in the global effort to prevent proliferation and stop the nuclear arms race in Latin America," since it came to establish "the necessary statute for the creation, for the first time in history, of a nuclear-free zone in an inhabited part of the Earth."

— Ismael Moreno Pino, writing in Law and Diplomacy in Inter-American Relations in 1999

The Tlatelolco Treaty inspired other regions in Asia, Australasia and Africa to become nuclear-weapon-free zones. Similarly, the Treaty on the Non-Proliferation of Nuclear Weapons was signed in 1968 and entered into force in 1970.

After 1969, he served as a delegate to The Agency for the Prohibition of Nuclear Weapons in Latin America and the Caribbean (OPANAL), an UN-backed agency headquartered in Mexico City, which is the sole international organization in the world entirely devoted to nuclear disarmament and the non-proliferation of nuclear weapons.

In 1966, in recognition of his work during the negotiations, the Government of Brazil awarded him the Grand Cross of the Order of the Southern Cross. Prior to that, President Juscelino Kubitschek, had already awarded him membership of the Order as a Grand Officer.

To this day, Mexico remains one of few countries possessing the technical capability to manufacture nuclear weapons, having successfully achieved the creation of highly enriched uranium. Following the Treaty of Tlatelolco, however, it has pledged to only use its nuclear technology for peaceful purposes. (See: Mexico and weapons of mass destruction). Argentina and Brazil are the two other regional powers that might also have the technical ability to develop nuclear weapons but have decided to abstain from doing so as they too are signatories to the Tlatelolco Treaty.

=== Ambassador to Chile ===
By the 1960s, Chile enjoyed a regional reputation as a stable, institutional, and progressive democracy, marked by alternating governments between Christian Democrats and the Radical Party. Between 1964 and 1970, President Eduardo Frei Montalva (1964–70) led an ambitious programme of moderate social reforms, strongly supported by the United States under the framework of the Alliance for Progress. For Mexico, also balancing revolutionary rhetoric with realpolitik and institutional stability, Chile represented a kindred model.

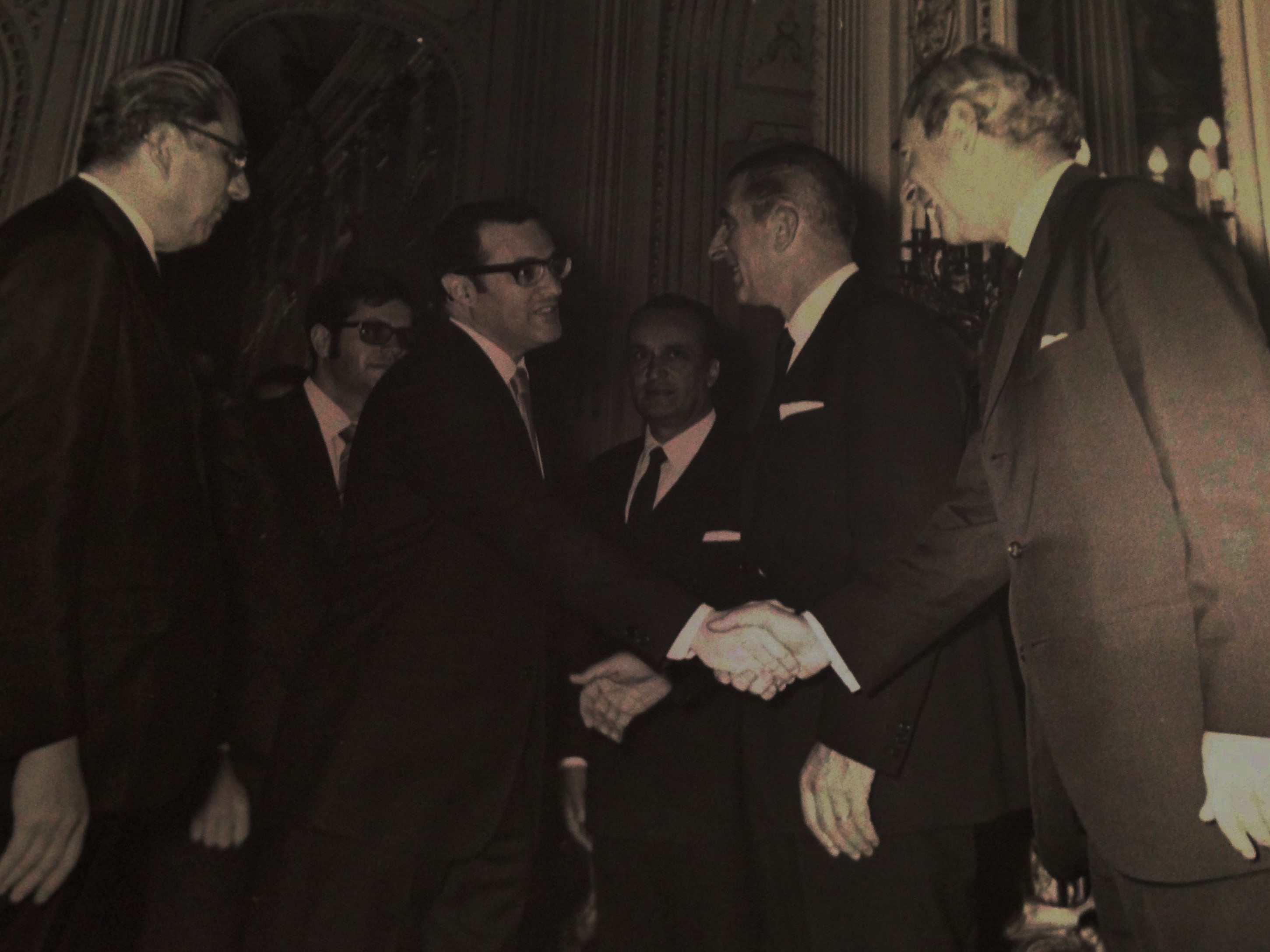
Moreno Pino (left) with Eduardo Frei (centre), President of Chile from 1964 to 1970, and his Foreign Minister, Gabriel Valdés Subercaseaux (right). Moreno Pino recognised the structural constraints confronting Frei's administration, particularly the resistance within Congress to his moderate land reform initiatives.

On 19 April 1965, President Díaz Ordaz appointed Moreno Pino Ambassador to Chile. His appointment was ratified by the Mexican Senate, and after receiving agrément from the Chilean government, he arrived in Santiago on 25 May and, three days later, he presented his letters of credence to President Frei at La Moneda Palace. After settling in, he purchased the ambassadorial residence in Santiago, still owned by Mexico in Américo Vespucci Avenue. Moreno Pino later described this assignment as a turning point in his career: it was his first direct experience with bilateral diplomacy. Besides the typical challenges faced by all new ambassadors, he served three terms as Dean of the Diplomatic Corps, substituting for successive Apostolic Nuncios: Righi-Lambertini, Martini, and Sanz Villalba.

In memoir excerpts published in 2021, Alexander Anikin, the Soviet Ambassador to Chile, recalled his conversations with Moreno Pino between 1965 and 1967. These discussions offer valuable insights into the political landscape of Chile during a pivotal time. Moreno Pino noted the economic and political struggles under President Frei, particularly the resistance to Frei's land reform proposal from right-wing parties in the Congress. He also observed the internal contradictions within the ruling Christian Democratic Party, where figures like Alberto Jerez pushed for bold reforms, while Frei and most ministers favored moderate, compromise-driven approaches.Moreno Pino also painted a complex picture of Chile's political scene, highlighting divisions within major parties like the Christian Democrats, Radicals, and Socialists. He pointed to a growing leftist faction within the Christian Democrats, which threatened to split the party, and tensions within the Socialist Party, with figures like Salvador Allende representing more flexible factions and Raúl Ampuero leading a hardline group.

As early as June 1967, Moreno Pino predicted the 1970 presidential race would feature Christian Democratic candidate Radomiro Tomic, Socialist Salvador Allende, and Conservative Jorge Alessandri. He anticipated that, if necessary, conservatives would support Tomic to block Allende. He also warned that a victory by Allende could prompt U.S. intervention to protect American interests in Chile.

When the 1970 election came, Moreno Pino witnessed events unfold much as he had foreseen. In a retrospective interview decades later, he reflected that although the vote was close, the process was conducted with civility and in accordance with Chilean democratic norms. Allende won a narrow plurality, triggering a congressional vote between the two top candidates, as required by law. Yet in keeping with tradition, Allende presented himself as President-Elect from the outset, setting the tone for a peaceful transition.

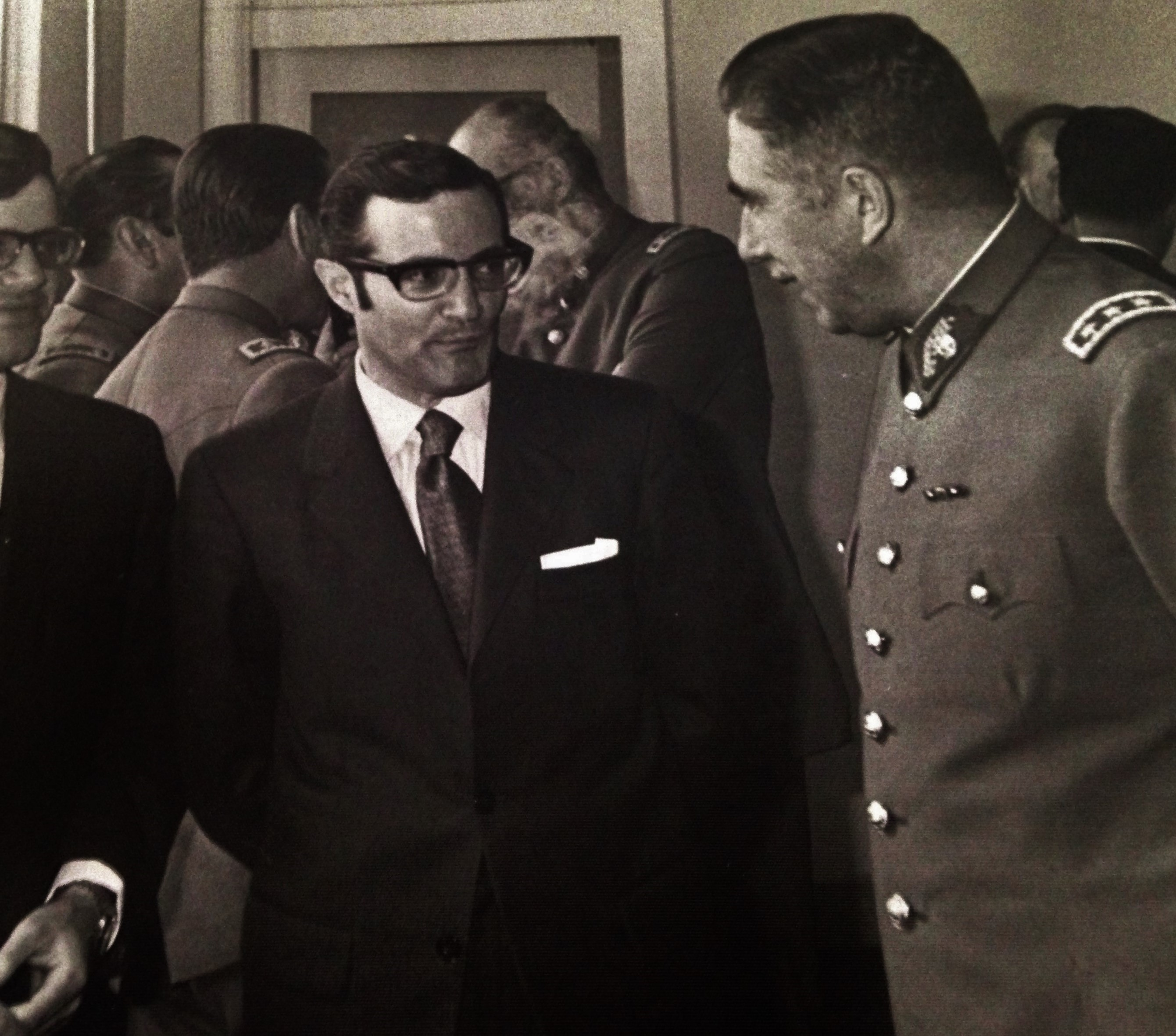
Moreno Pino (left) with General Augusto Pinochet (right), President of Chile from 1973 to 1990. In his reflections, Moreno Pino observed that before the 1973 coup d’état, the Chilean Armed Forces had maintained a tradition of professionalism and institutional restraint.

As Dean of the Diplomatic Corps, Moreno Pino was soon encouraged—though not formally pressured—to pay a courtesy call on Allende. Conscious of the delicate political context, he delayed the visit to avoid any appearance of foreign interference. However, once it became clear that the Christian Democrats were leaning toward respecting the traditional outcome, and as ambassadors from Warsaw Pact countries began publicly recognising Allende, he concluded that to preserve the authority of his office, a visit was necessary. It was diplomatically successful: the gesture was appreciated, and no criticism ensued. He also oversaw the organisation of the customary gala dinner for the incoming president, a tradition fraught with tension given Allende's Marxist–Leninist affiliations. While socialist nations welcomed his victory with enthusiasm, not all diplomatic missions in Santiago shared that view. Nevertheless, through careful negotiation, the event was carried off without incident.

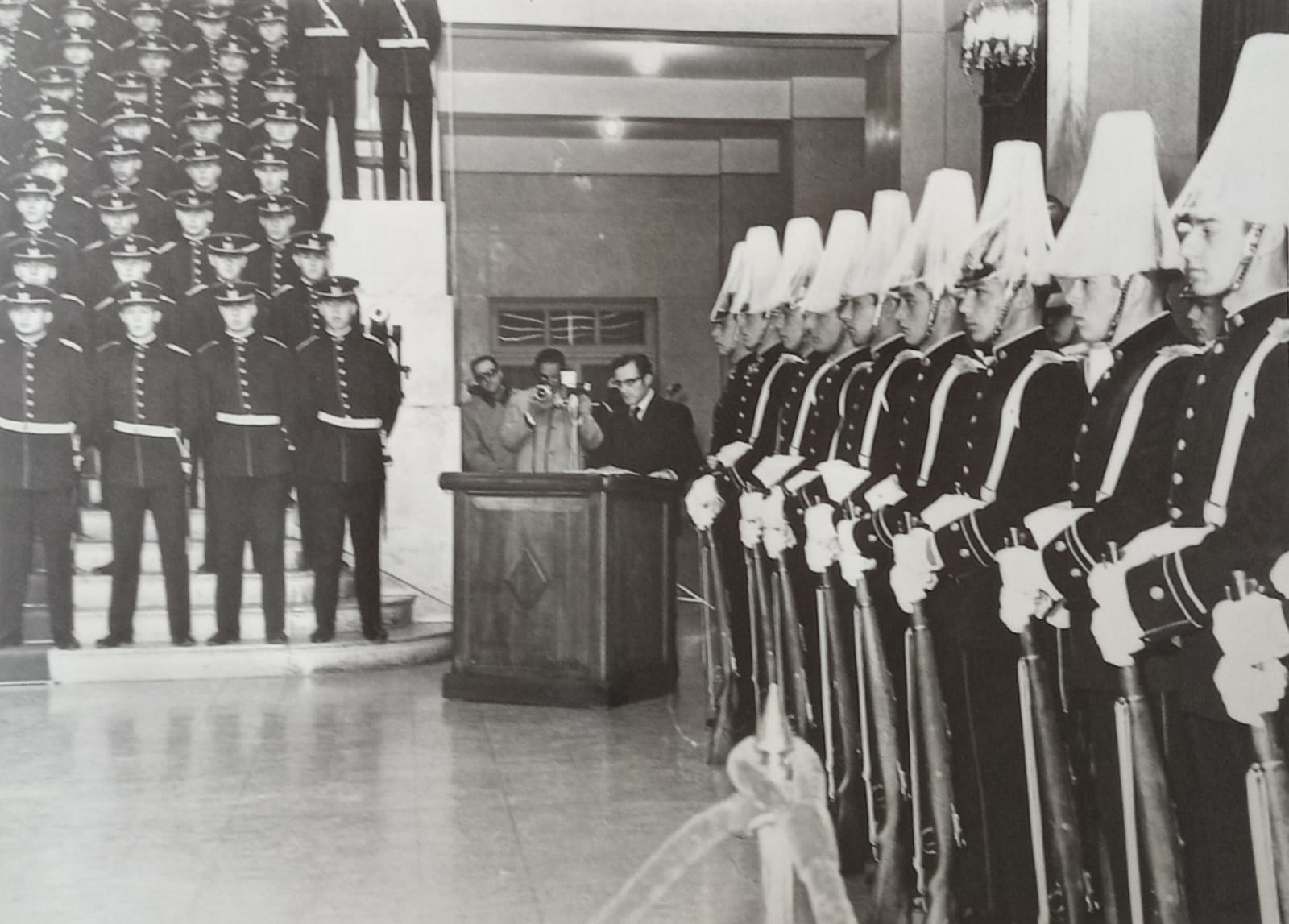
The ceremony at which Moreno Pino (centre) presented a bust of Benito Juárez to the Bernardo O'Higgins Military Academy. The event was presided over by General Carlos Prats, Commander-in-Chief of the Chilean Army (not pictured).

The rise of Salvador Allende in 1970, the first Marxist in the world to come to power through democratic elections, placed Chile at the centre of international attention. Nevertheless, reflecting on Allende's presidency, Moreno Pino assessed it as fundamentally democratic in character, albeit fraught with immense structural challenges. He viewed Allende as both a democrat and a revolutionary, but concluded that such duality was inherently unstable. If Allende governed as a democrat, revolution would stall; if as a revolutionary, democracy would collapse. The lack of a clear majority in Congress meant he had to seek shifting alliances—sometimes with the Christian Democrats, sometimes with the right, just to pass legislation. Despite his political acumen, the circumstances were not propitious for transformative change. In Moreno Pino's view, the contradictions at the heart of the Allende government, both ideological and institutional, ultimately undermined its capacity to govern. In confidential diplomatic cables to Emilio Óscar Rabasa, Mexico's Foreign Secretary (1970–75), Moreno Pino raised concerns about the Chilean economy under Allende's stewardship. Moreno Pino pointed out that, in a bid to win popular support, Allende had increased worker wages by up to 55%. To finance this, the Allende government resorted to printing money, which led to an inflationary spiral. Meanwhile, the Nixon administration, keen to destabilize Allende's regime, persuaded capitalist economies to boycott Chile, causing a situation where workers had money but little to buy, as inventories ran out. In a 1999 interview, Moreno Pino noted that under Frei, consumers lacked purchasing power despite a relatively well-stocked market; under Allende, it was the reverse: people had money, but the shelves were bare. This, he believed, profoundly damaged the administration's credibility.

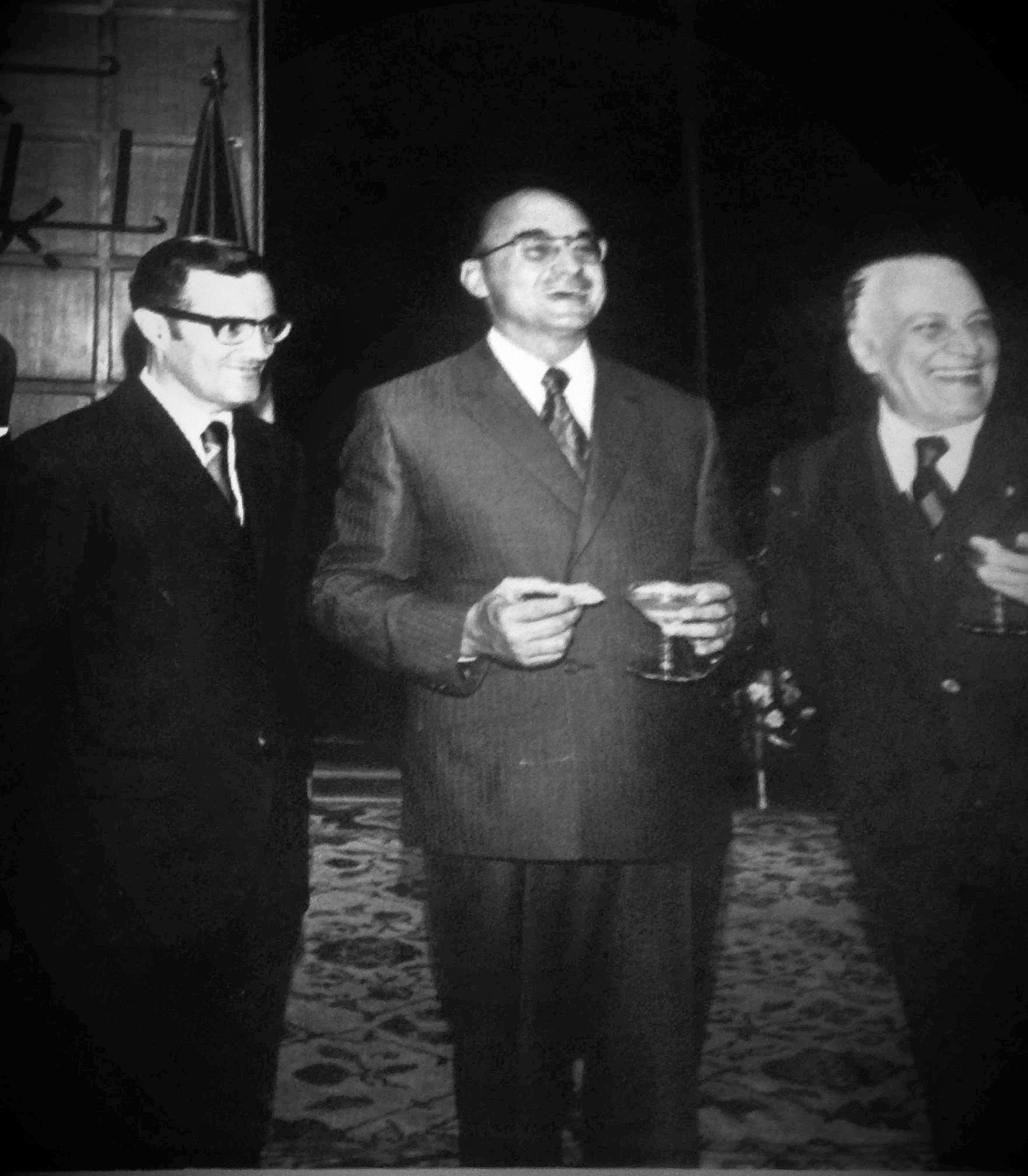
Moreno Pino (left) with Luis Echeverría (centre), President of Mexico from 1970 to 1976, who significantly deepened ties with Chile as part of his broader Cold War policy.

In Moreno Pino's view, the wave of land and factory occupations by Allende's radicalised supporters only deepened the crisis, alienating key sectors of Chilean society, particularly the middle class, many of whom began to call on the military to intervene. He also noted that during his tenure, the Chilean armed forces, headed by Carlos Prats, retained their professionalism and restraint. Later, Rabasa would tell US Ambassador Joseph J. Jova that while Allende was a poor administrator, he was a patriotic figure intent on dismantling Chile's oligarchy.

During the 1960s, Mexico began shifting away from its tradition of self-imposed diplomatic isolation. Luis Echeverría, Mexico's President (1970–76), significantly deepened ties with Chile, as part of its broader shift toward Third Worldism and solidarity with democratic leftist movements. Echeverría, who had deep admiration for Allende, sought to foster closer ties with Chile, believing that such a relationship would reinforce Mexico's political legitimacy after the 1968 Tlatelolco massacre. This effort culminated in two state visits in 1972: Echeverría visited Santiago in April, followed by Allende's reciprocal visit to Mexico in December. However, after the 1973 coup, Echeverría severed diplomatic ties with the Pinochet regime, a break that lasted until 1990. Echeverría also offered refuge to Chilean exiles, including Allende's widow, Hortensia Bussi.

During this period, Mexico's Embassy in Santiago became a key interlocutor, reporting back to the Foreign Ministry and providing diplomatic support as internal tensions in Chile escalated. Both Mexico and Chile played active roles in multilateral institutions such as ECLAC and the United Nations, often coordinating positions within the Global South. Santiago was a major intellectual and publishing hub in South America: there was considerable academic exchange between Mexican and Chilean universities and publishing houses such as the University of Chile and Quimantú maintained ties with Mexico's Fondo de Cultura Económica. The embassy also served a cultural function, engaging with figures such as Pablo Neruda, as well as with the Chilean university scene.

During his time in Chile, Moreno Pino played a key role in strengthening Mexico-Chile relations and was recognized by Allende with the Grand Cross of the Order of Merit before his departure to Germany.

=== Ambassador to Germany ===
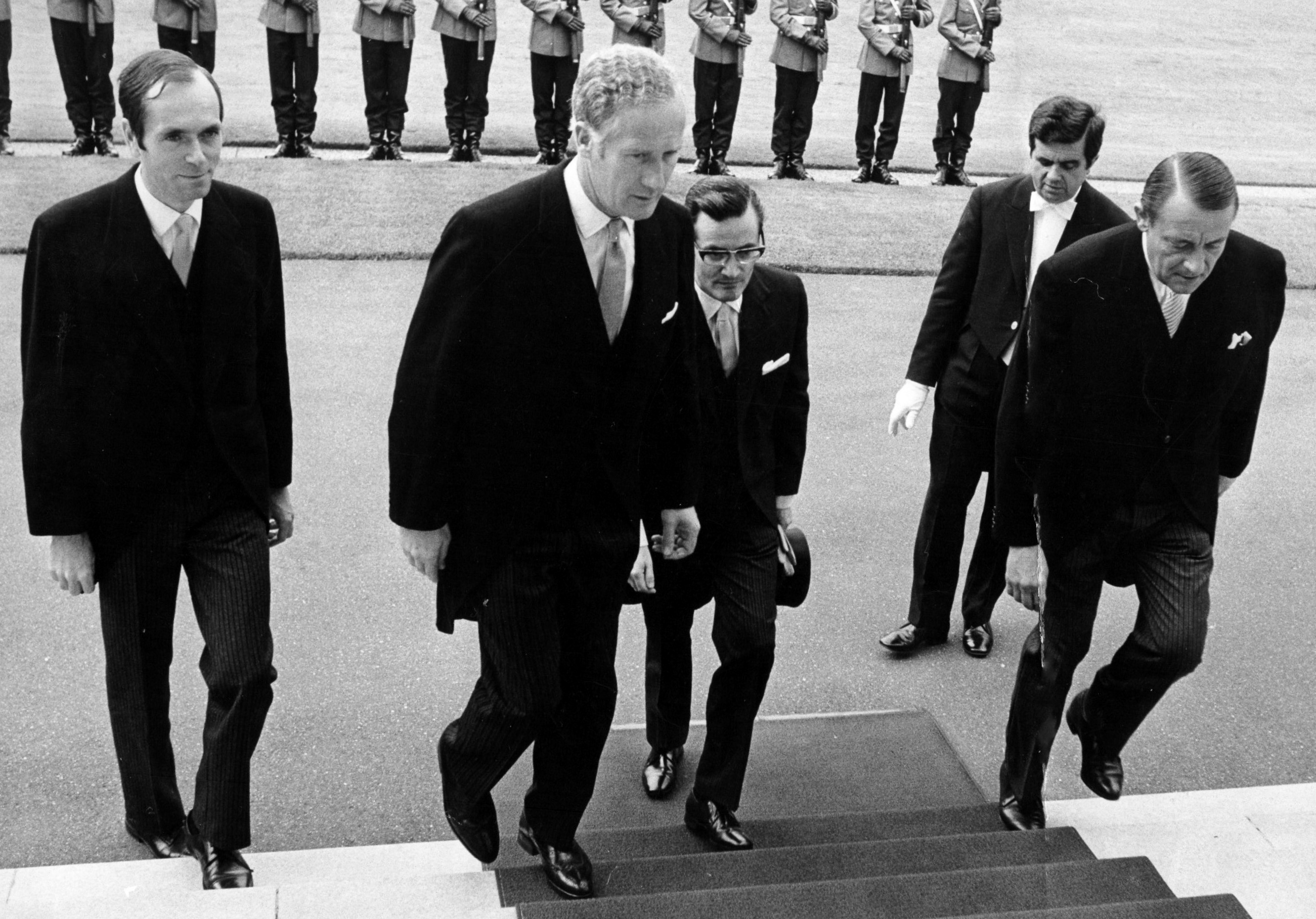
Moreno Pino (centre), arriving at the Hammerschmidt Villa in August 1972 to present his credentials to Dr. Gustav Heinemann, who served as President of West Germany from 1969 to 1974. His diplomatic efforts in Bonn and East Berlin contributed to Mexico's recognition of East Germany (GDR), in alignment with Ostpolitik and the broader détente of the 1970s.

Arriving in Bonn in August 1972 as Mexico's ambassador, Moreno Pino presented his credentials to President Gustav Heinemann at the Hammerschmidt Villa in Bonn, Germany. His appointment marked a milestone for regional representation within Mexico's foreign service. Revista de Mérida reported that Moreno Pino was the first Yucateco to hold such a high-profile diplomatic post, although his great-uncle, Nicolás Cámara Vales, had previously served as Mexico's Consul-General in Berlin during the Weimar Republic.

In the 1970s, Germany stood as a unique and complex focal point of the Cold War, symbolized by the Berlin Wall and the political division between West Germany (FRG), with its capital in Bonn, capitalist and aligned with the United States, and East Germany (GDR), with its capital in East Berlin, communist and aligned with the USSR. Under Chancellor Willy Brandt, Bonn advanced Ostpolitik ("Eastern Policy"), a strategy of rapprochement with the Eastern Bloc and détente with the Warsaw Pact countries.

Mexican diplomacy regarded European capitals, especially Paris and Bonn, as strategic alternatives to Washington's influence. While maintaining close ties with the West, Mexico projected a non-aligned image, a posture reinforced by its close relationship with Bonn. By the 1970s, West Germany had become one of Mexico's leading European trading partners and a preferred ally for technology transfer, industrial investment, and scientific cooperation. The German automotive and chemical sectors were central to this relationship; since 1967, for example, Volkswagen had operated assembly plants in Puebla and has since maintained a strong industrial presence in Mexico. A robust network of academic and scientific exchange further supported bilateral ties, driven by the German Academic Exchange Service (Deutscher Akademischer Austauschdienst) and institutions such as the Goethe-Institut.

Under President Luis Echeverría, who emphasized an autonomous and assertive foreign policy, the decision to engage with the GDR became both a matter of national interest and strategic vision. Within this framework, Moreno Pino participated in negotiations with senior West German officials, including Chancellor Willy Brandt and Foreign Minister Walter Scheel, while also engaging with East German leaders such as Erich Honecker. His diplomatic efforts culminated in January 1973, when Mexico formally recognized the GDR, becoming one of the first Latin American countries to do so. The following year, in 1974, Mexico opened its Embassy in East Berlin.

The 1972 Munich Olympics also marked a defining moment in Moreno Pino's ambassadorship. The Games were tragically overshadowed by the hostage crisis involving the Israeli team and the Palestinian terrorist group Black September. The attack triggered a global diplomatic crisis. Still grappling with the political fallout from the 1968 Mexico City Olympics, Mexico responded with measured neutrality, reaffirming its commitment to peace and supporting international efforts to defuse the situation.

=== Other bilateral and multilateral diplomatic postings ===
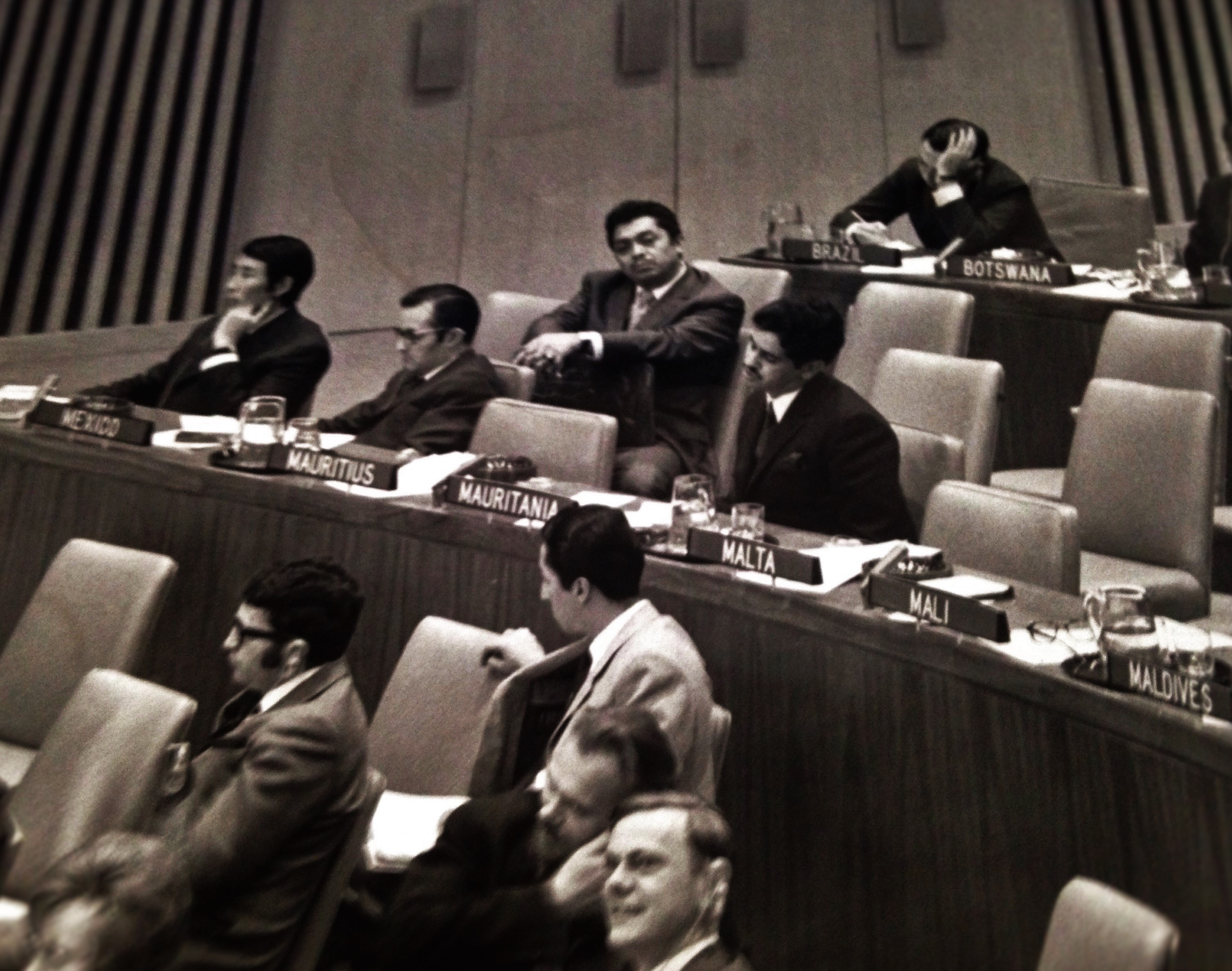
Moreno Pino (second person on the second row) as a delegate to the United Nations General Assembly in New York City. Throughout his diplomatic career, he represented Mexico at over fifty international conferences, addressing issues ranging from disarmament to reciprocal assistance.

During his extensive diplomatic service, he was stationed in Europe (Bonn and The Hague), Latin America (Santiago, Lima, Caracas, and Santo Domingo), and at major International Organizations in Washington, D.C., New York City, and Geneva. In 1990, he was recalled to Mexico to act as a Senior Foreign Policy Adviser to the President of Mexico. Over four decades, he served under eight presidents, from Alemán to Salinas, and nine Foreign Secretaries from Tello to Solana. Reflecting on his tenure, he would later write:

"The eternal gratitude I hold towards those who, besides being wise and respectable bosses during my formative years, knew how to be generous and understanding mentors. During my diplomatic career, I had the chance to work directly and closely with Foreign Secretaries of the stature of Manuel Tello, José Gorostiza, Antonio Carrillo Flores, Alfonso García Robles, and Jorge Castañeda, as well as with ambassadors of the caliber of Rafael de la Colina, Antonio Gómez Robledo, Octavio Paz, and Luis Quintanilla... the great diplomats of contemporary Mexico."

In 1990, at the end of his diplomatic mission in The Hague, he was knighted by Beatrix, Queen of the Netherlands, who awarded him the Grand Cross of the Order of Orange-Nassau in recognition of his efforts in strengthening Mexico–Netherlands relations.

Between 1986 and 1990, he was also a member of the administrative council of the Permanent Court of Arbitration in The Hague, The Netherlands.

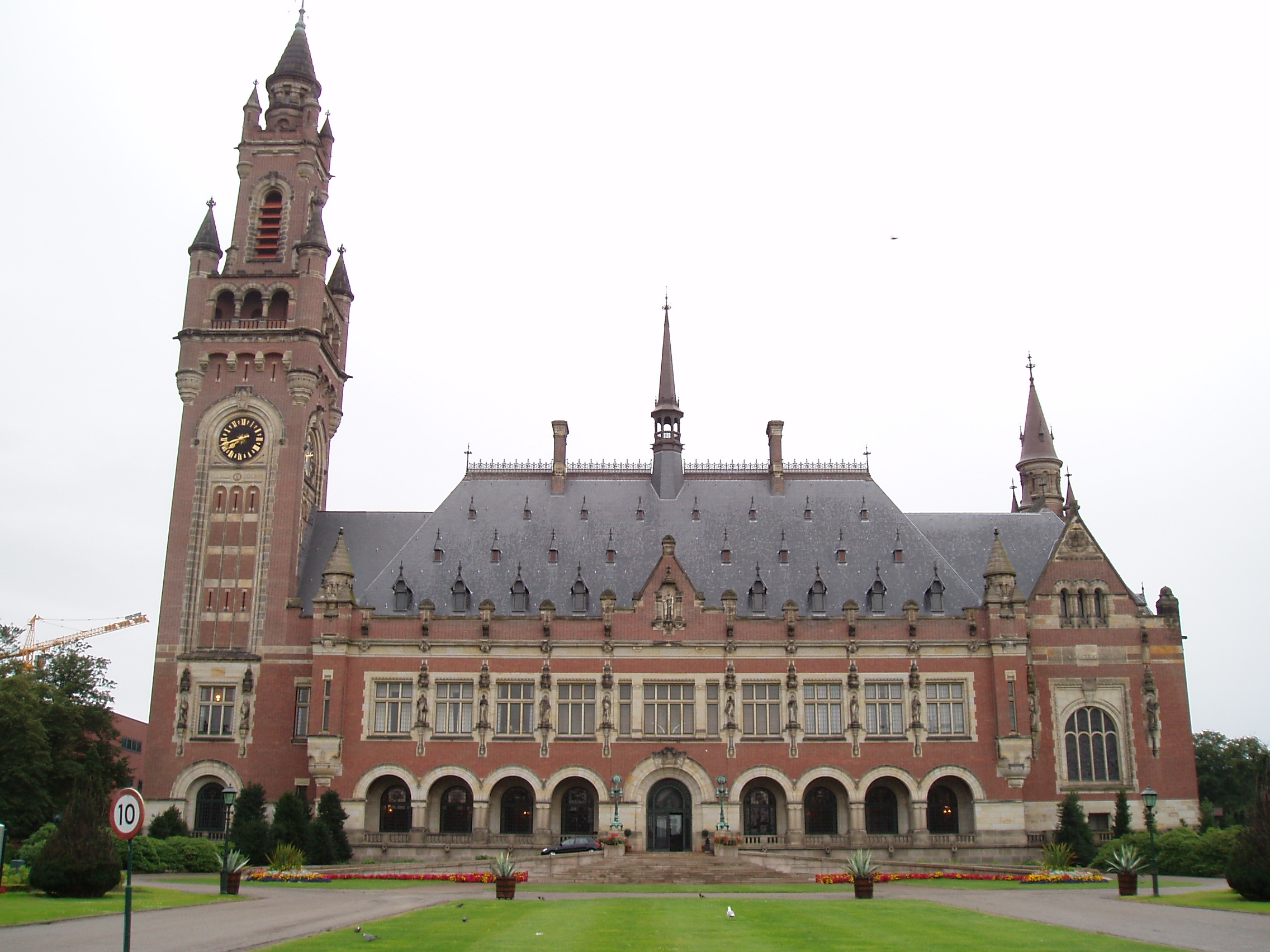
Between 1986 and 1990, Moreno Pino was also a member of the administrative council of the Permanent Court of Arbitration in The Hague, The Netherlands.

During his career, he developed into one of the most eminent policy experts in the Foreign Office on International organizations and on the Western Hemisphere. He participated in drafting the amendments carried out to the Inter-American Treaty of Reciprocal Assistance (TIAR) under the Protocol of Buenos Aires (1967), the Protocol of San José (1975) and the Protocol of Cartagena de Indias (1985). The TIAR had established the "hemispheric defense" doctrine which establishes that an attack against one OAS member state should be considered an attack against them all.

As a distinguished multilateralist, he acted as a Special Ambassador to many international organizations over the years. In this capacity, he represented Mexico in the Organization of American States in Washington, D.C. and in United Nations offices in New York and in Geneva, Switzerland. Throughout his career, he was a delegate in over fifty international conferences on various issues ranging from disarmament to reciprocal assistance; on many occasions, he served as a delegate in the United Nations General Assembly in New York City.

He was the Secretary General of the Mexican Delegation to the First United Nations Conference on the Law of the Sea, held in Geneva, Switzerland, between February and April 1958. The conference was important in establishing the modern legal framework of the law of the sea.

He also represented Mexico in the Eighteen Nations Disarmament Committee (ENCD) that was held in Geneva between March and August 1962. Starting in 1969, he was an alternate representative before the Agency for the Prohibition of Nuclear Weapons in Latin America and the Caribbean (OPANAL) based in Mexico City.

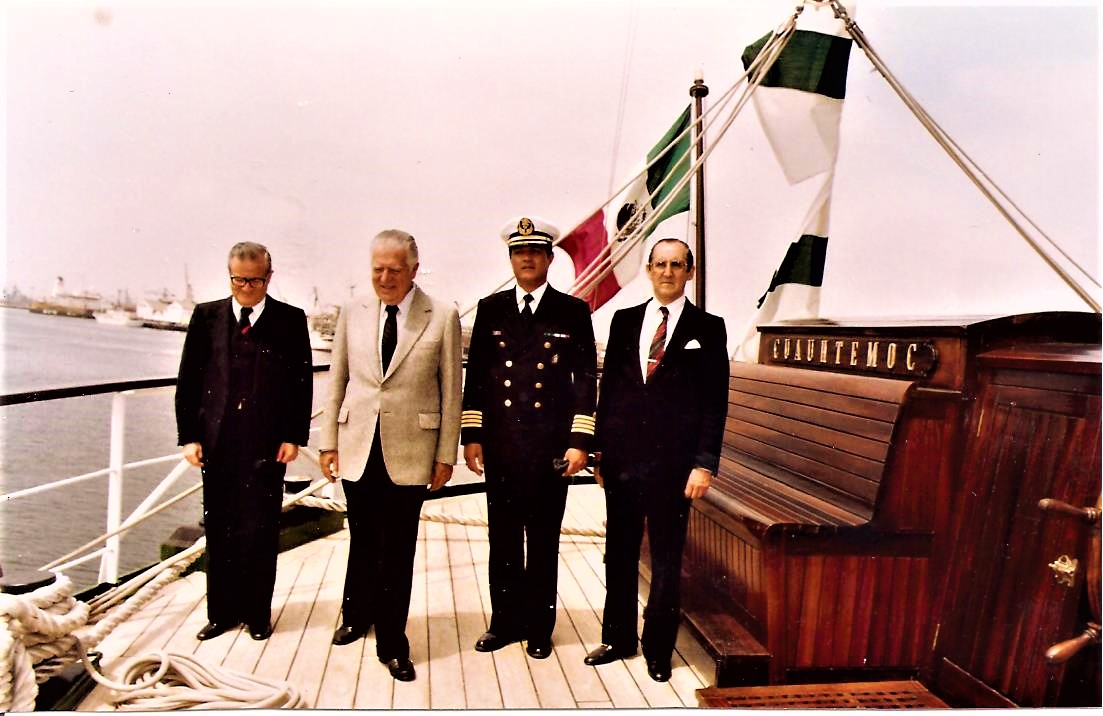
Moreno Pino (left) hosting Fernando Belaúnde Terry (centre left), President of Peru (1963–1968; 1980–1985), aboard the ARM Cuauhtémoc (BE01), the sail training vessel of the Mexican Navy, during a visit to Callao, Peru. Belaúnde led the first democratic government after twelve years of military dictatorship. For Mexico, this presented an opportunity to relaunch bilateral relations and counterbalance U.S. influence in the region during the Reagan administration.

Likewise, between 1965 and 1972, he was the permanent representative to the United Nations Economic Commission for Latin America (CEPAL), the UN agency responsible for promoting the economic and social development of the region.

An adjunct professor of international law, he lectured at Georgetown University, the Mexico City College (UDLAP), Instituto Tecnológico Autónomo de México (ITAM) and Instituto Matias Romero.

== Death and legacy ==
José Antonio Meade, then the Foreign Secretary, announced his death in August 2013 and offered condolences to Moreno Pino's family. Meade acknowledged Moreno Pino's profound contributions during his forty-year diplomatic tenure, emphasizing that he had played a pivotal role in "strengthening the good name of Mexican diplomacy."

In April 2022, almost a decade after his passing, Senator Germán Martínez Cázares delivered a poignant speech on the Senate floor, honoring Moreno Pino as "one of the great diplomats of Mexico." Moreno Pino's lineage, as the grandson of Vice-President Pino Suárez, and his close collaboration with Alfonso García Robles, a key figure in achieving global nuclear disarmament, were highlighted. Martínez Cázares underscored the immense significance of Moreno Pino's diplomatic endeavors and cautioned against using the Mexican Foreign Service for mere political expediency.

== Major books ==
Moreno Pino wrote numerous hemerographic and bibliographic publications. Among the latter, the following stand out:

- Origins and Evolution of the Inter-American System (In Spanish: Orígenes y evolución del sistema interamericano). Tlatelolco, México: Secretaría de Relaciones Exteriores, 1977. OCLC 4041498
- Law and Diplomacy in Inter-American Relations (In Spanish: Derecho y diplomacia en las relaciones interamericanas). Mexico, D.F.: Secretaría de Relaciones Exteriores, Fondo de Cultura Económica, 1999. ISBN 978-968-16-5995-0
- Diplomacy: Theoretical and Practical Aspects (In Spanish: La diplomacia: aspectos teoricos y prácticos de su ejercicio profesional). México: Secretaría de Relaciones Exteriores, 2001. ISBN 978-968-16-5234-0

The Matías Romero Institute of Diplomatic Studies, whose main objective is to prepare aspiring candidates who wish to join the Foreign Service, has highlighted the work of Moreno Pino as an author, along with other diplomats.

"Special recognition is warranted for the invaluable contributions made to the Mexican diplomatic bibliographic collection by distinguished compatriots who have wholeheartedly dedicated themselves to a career in the Foreign Service. Among them, we find notable figures such as Isidro Fabela, Rafael de la Colina, Luis Padilla Nervo, Ismael Moreno Pino, Jorge Castañeda, and Alfonso García Robles, to name just a few. Not only have they left behind a written legacy, but their professional achievements have also served as a guiding light for countless generations of career diplomats."

José Luis Siqueiros Prieto, Founding Partner of Hogan Lovells BSTL and former Chairman of the Inter-American Judicial Committee of the OAS, commenting on Diplomacy: Theoretical and Practical Aspects wrote that:

"It is somewhat surprising that given the large bibliography available on public international law, the collection of works on Diplomatic Law is rather limited. Leaving aside the already classic texts by Antokoletz, Cahier, Calvo, Nicolson, Pradier-Fodéré, and Vidal y Saura, the most recent of them published more than two decades ago, no new work has been published in that discipline ... work such as the one being discussed, was absent from the national bibliography. It is for this reason, truly satisfying that ... this book – which is not an essay or manual, but a true treatise on the subject – has been published. The author of the work is Ambassador Ismael Moreno Pino, who, in addition to [his] academic credentials, brings to the table a life devoted to Mexican diplomacy ... In this work, written with scientific rigor and the methodology of the academic, Ambassador Moreno Pino analyzes the entire scope and nature of diplomatic relations, not only from a doctrinal perspective but also with the brushstrokes of his own experiences in the interesting world of diplomatic missions abroad qualifying his teachings with interesting case studies such as that of the so-called Ten Tragic Days... In sum, this work is worthy of being read by all scholars of international and diplomatic law both in Mexico and abroad. It is a valuable addition to the limited bibliography of this important discipline."

Similarly, commenting on Law and Diplomacy in Inter-American Relations, Bernardo Sepúlveda Amor, the former Vice-President of the International Court of Justice and Mexican Foreign Secretary, stated that:

"Ambassador Moreno Pino [...] has written an important work on politics, law, and diplomacy in Inter-American relations. Although the work deals mainly with issues related to the structure and functioning of the Organization of American States (OAS), the text has even more ambitious content. It presents, with impeccable writing, a historical perspective of the remote origins of the inter-American movement, taking as its source the Spanish School of International Law. It examines, in admirable detail, the evolution of that regional organization, with its successes and frustrations, with its legal talent and political limitations, with its capacity to create institutions and norms, as well as its inability to apply them. For those who intend to learn about the nature of the Inter-American system, the work of Ismael Moreno Pino is required reading [...] it suggests a joint reflection on some of its important issues, to evaluate the role that the OAS should play and the role that Mexico ought to play with other Western Hemisphere countries."

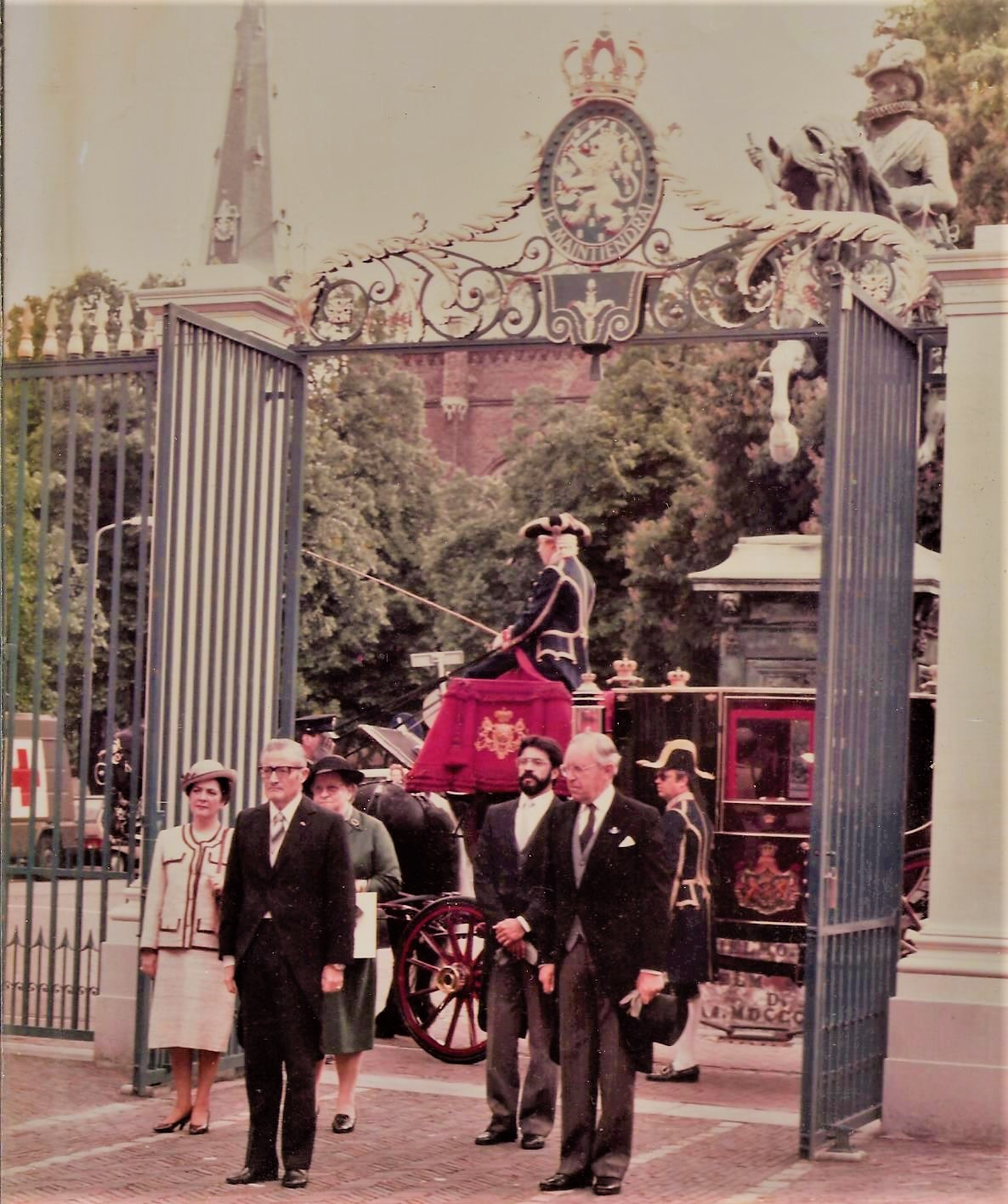
Moreno Pino (centre), Ambassador of Mexico to the Netherlands, is received at the gates of the Noordeinde Palace in The Hague during his presentation of letters of credence to Beatrix, Queen of the Netherlands between 1980 and 2013.

== Portrayals in Culture and Media ==
=== Henri Cartier Bresson Photograph in the V&A Museum ===
In 1963, he and his wife were the subjects of a photograph by Henri Cartier Bresson, the famed French photographer, which is now part of the permanent collection at the Victoria and Albert Museum in London. It is described as follows by the V&A Museum:

"Black and white photograph depicting guests at a drinks reception for the Ministry for Foreign Affairs in Mexico City. There are two men wearing tuxedos standing on the left holding drinks, whilst two women sit separately on elaborate chairs. The women are wearing almost identical outfits with fur coats. Two people present in the image are Ambassador Ismael Moreno Pino and Guadalupe Mercedes González de Hermosillo y Quirós."

The photograph is also published in Cartier Bresson's Mexican Notebooks 1934 – 64 (in French: Carnets Mexicains 1934 – 1964) which includes several works by Cartier Bresson during his second stint living in Mexico. By 1963, when the photograph was taken, Cartier was already one of the most famous photographers in the world:

Cartier-Bresson would not return to the country for almost 30 years [...] by the time he returned to Mexico, on commission for LIFE magazine, he was one of the most celebrated photographers in the world. His access, and means were now far greater – he photographed a black-tie reception at the Ministry for Foreign Affairs, trekked to the foothills of the Popocatepetl volcano, and stood on the frontline of the anniversary celebrations of the death of Emiliano Zapata, the Mexican Revolutionary.

== Honors and Decorations ==
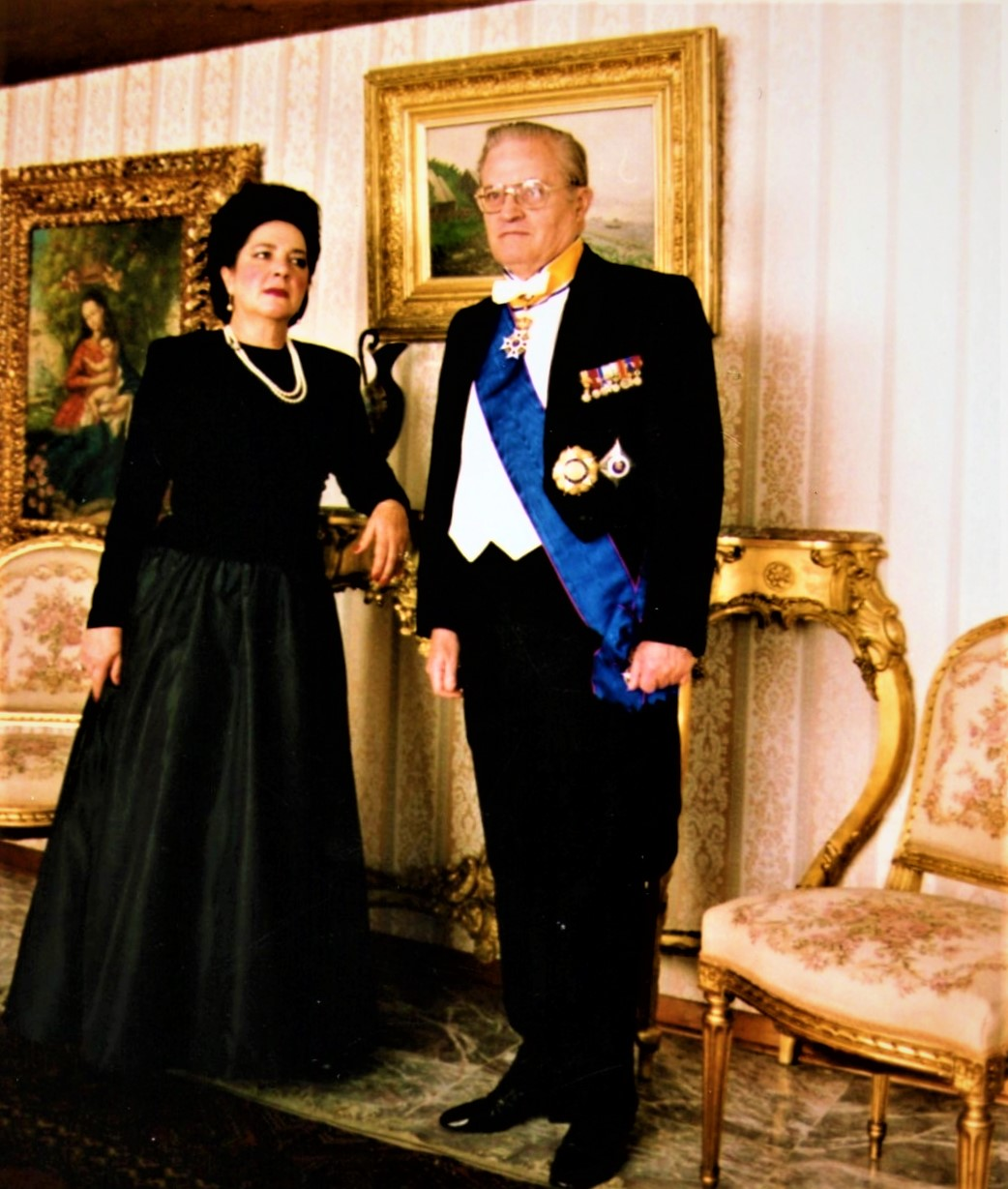
Moreno Pino (right) with his wife, Guadalupe Mercedes González de Hermosillo y Quirós (left), both dressed for a gala dinner.

Throughout his diplomatic career, Moreno Pino was awarded several honors from several governments, including those of Brazil, Chile, Germany, Japan, The Netherlands, Mexico, Peru, The Republic of China, Venezuela, and Yugoslavia:

- Brazil:
  - Grand Officer of the Order of the Southern Cross, awarded by Juscelino Kubitschek, The President of Brazil.
  - Grand Cross of the Order of the Southern Cross, awarded by Humberto de Alencar Castelo Branco, The President of Brazil
- Chile:
  - Grand Cross of the Order of Merit (Chile), awarded by Salvador Allende, The President of Chile
- Germany:
  - Knight Grand Cross of the Order of Merit of the Federal Republic of Germany, awarded by Gustav Heinemann, The President of Germany.
- Japan:
  - Order of the Sacred Treasure, Second Class, Gold and Silver Star, awarded by Hirohito, The Emperor of Japan.
- Mexico:
  - Foreign Service Medal, awarded by Carlos Salinas de Gortari, President of Mexico.
- The Netherlands:
  - Grand Officer of the Order of Orange-Nassau, awarded by Juliana, The Queen of the Netherlands.
  - Knight Grand Cross of the Order of Orange-Nassau, awarded by Beatrix, The Queen of the Netherlands
- Peru:
  - Grand Cross with Diamonds of the Order of the Sun of Peru, awarded by Alan García, The President of Peru.
- Republic of China:
  - Order of Brilliant Star, Grand Cordon (First Class), awarded by Chiang Kai-shek, The President of the Republic of China.
- Venezuela:
  - Order of the Liberator, Grand Cordon (First Class), awarded by Luis Herrera Campins, The President of Venezuela.
- Yugoslavia:
  - Order of the Yugoslav Star, Great Star, awarded by Marshal Josip Broz Tito, The President of Yugoslavia

== Bibliography ==
- Moreno Pino, Ismael. Orígenes y evolución del sistema interamericano. Tlatelolco, México: Secretaría de Relaciones Exteriores, 1977. OCLC 4041498
- Moreno Pino, Ismael. La diplomacia: aspectos teoricos y prácticos de su ejercicio profesional. México: Secretaría de Relaciones Exteriores, 2001. ISBN 978-968-16-5234-0
- Moreno Pino, Ismael. Derecho y diplomacia en las relaciones interamericanas. Mexico, D.F.: Secretaría de Relaciones Exteriores, Fondo de Cultura Económica, 1999. ISBN 978-968-16-5995-0
