= Bernardo Sepúlveda =

Bernardo Sepúlveda may refer to:

- Bernardo Sepúlveda Gutiérrez (1912–1985), Mexican physician, member of the Colegio Nacional (Mexico)
- Bernardo Sepúlveda Amor (b. 1941), Mexican diplomat, foreign secretary, judge of the International Court of Justice
