= Jorge Castañeda y Álvarez de la Rosa =

Mexican diplomat

Jorge Castañeda
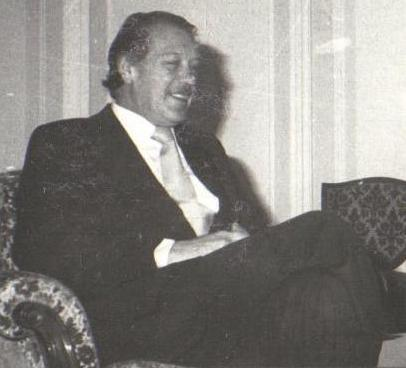

Secretary of Foreign Affairs
- In office April 1979 – 30 November 1982
- President: José López Portillo
- Preceded by: Santiago Roel García
- Succeeded by: Bernardo Sepúlveda Amor

Personal details
- Born: 1 October 1921 Mexico City
- Died: 11 December 1997 (aged 76) Mexico City
- Party: PRI
- Education: UNAM
- Profession: Lawyer, Diplomat

Jorge Castañeda y Álvarez de la Rosa (1 October 1921 – 11 December 1997) was a Mexican diplomat. He served as Secretary of Foreign Affairs from April 1979 to 30 November 1982, during the administration of José López Portillo. His son, Jorge Castañeda Gutman, was foreign secretary from 2000 to 2003.

Born in Mexico City, Castañeda studied law at the National Autonomous University of Mexico, where he also later lectured. He was a leading Latin American international lawyer. He taught at the Colegio de México and the Escuela Libre de Derecho and served as ambassador to France, Egypt and the United Nations.

== Bibliography ==
- Jorge Castañeda, Naciones Unidas: Prólogo de Bernardo Sepúlveda Amor (Bernardo Sepúlveda Amor ed., El Colegio de México, 1995).
- Jorge Castañeda, Obras completas: Derecho del Mar (El Colegio de México, 1995).
- Jorge Castañeda, Obras completas. T. III Política exterior y cuestiones internacionales (El Colegio de México, 1995).
- Jorge G. Castañeda, Amarres Perros una autobiografía (Penguin Libros 2014).
- Francisco Quintana, Small Powers, International Organizations and the Role of Law (https://academic.oup.com/ejil/article/34/2/319/7193312).
- Pellicer, Olga. "Reseña de Jorge Castañeda, Obras completas." Revista Mexicana de Política Exterior 48 (1995): 247–250.
- Vicuña, Francisco Orrego. La zona económica exclusiva: régimen y naturaleza jurídica en el derecho internacional. Editorial Jurídica de Chile, 1991.

Political offices
Preceded by Santiago Roel García	Secretary of Foreign Affairs; 1979–1982	Succeeded by Bernardo Sepúlveda Amor
