= Olga Pellicer =

Mexican ambassador

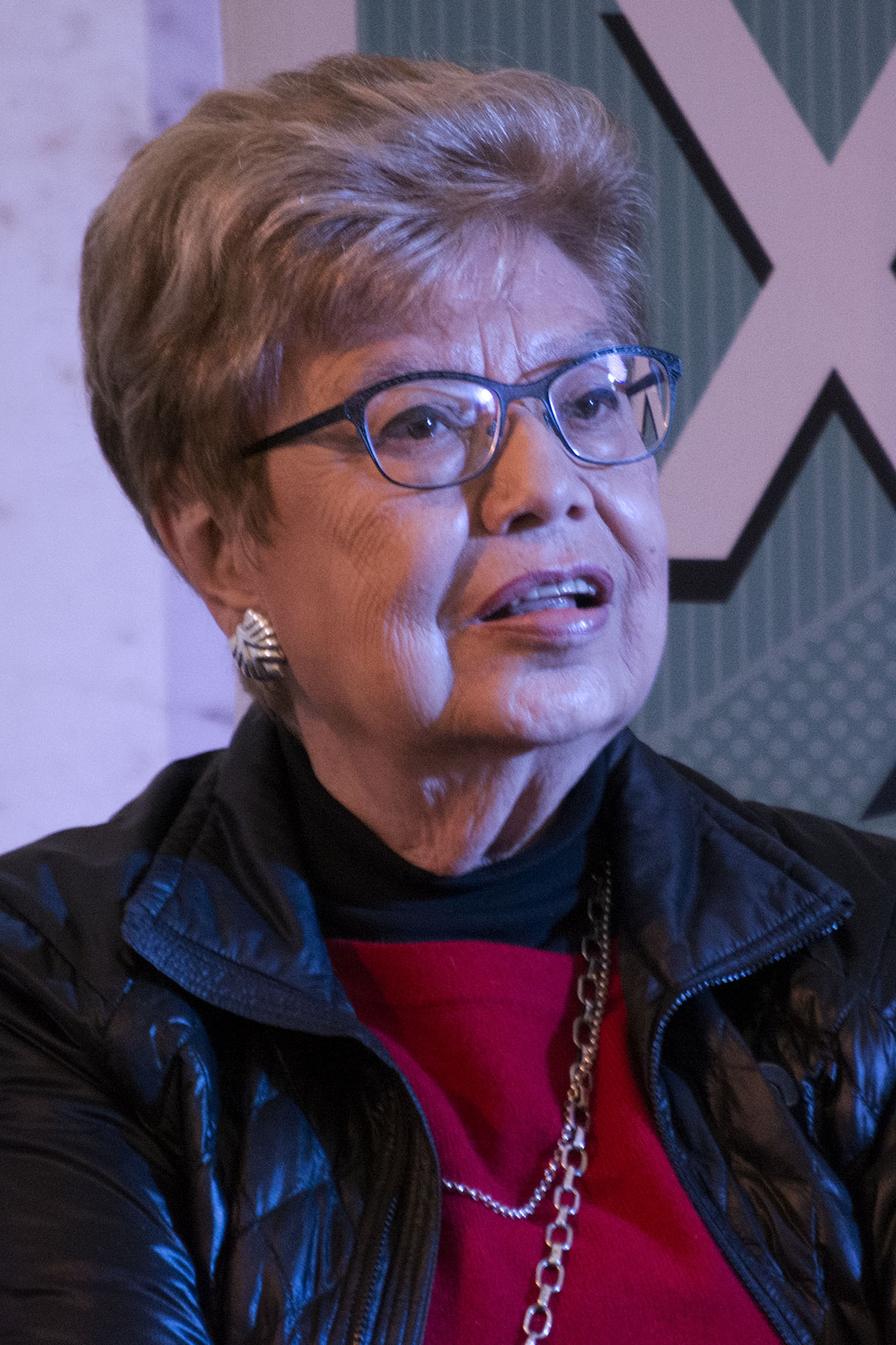
Pellicer in 2017

Olga Pellicer Silva is a Mexican diplomat who has served as Mexico's ambassador to Austria and the United Nations in New York. She is also a journalist and academic.

== Education ==
Pellicer holds a bachelor's degree in International Relations from the National Autonomous University of Mexico (UNAM) and a master's degree in the same field from the Institute of Higher International Studies in Paris, France.

== Career ==
As an advisor to the Ministry of Foreign Affairs, she represented Mexico in numerous international missions on disarmament, labor, and women's issues. In this area, she served as chair of the United Nations Commission on the Status of Women. In the field of disarmament, she was vice chair of the International Atomic Energy Agency (IAEA) and a member of the organizing committee for the Second International Conference on the Entry into Force of the Treaty on the Non-Proliferation of Nuclear Weapons. She has been a professor at UNAM, a member of the Department of International Studies at Instituto Tecnológico Autónomo de México, as well as a professor at the Centro de Investigación y Docencia Económicas and El Colegio de México. She served as director of the Instituto Matías Romero at the Ministry of Foreign Affairs. She is a columnist for Proceso.

== Selected works ==
- Centroamérica : futuro y opciones, 1983 (ISBN 9789681613822)
- La Política Exterior de México; enfoques para su análisis (doi:10.2307/j.ctv3f8q79)
- La voz de México en la Asamblea General de la ONU, 2009 (ISBN 9786074460100)
- México y el mundo: cambios y continuidades, 2006 (ISBN 9789707018822)
- México y la revolución cubana, 1971 (ASIN B000FOVR58)

=== Other ===
- La OEA a los cincuenta años
- La UE de los 25; una retrospectiva
- Las Naciones Unidas; crisis y recuperación, 1981
- Principios Constitucionales de política exterior; mito y realidad
- Tendencias en materia de paz y seguridad internacionales
