= Diplomacy (Moreno Pino book) =

1996 book by Ismael Moreno Pino

Diplomacy: Theoretical and Practical Aspects
- Author: Ismael Moreno Pino
- Language: Spanish
- Subject: Diplomacy; International relations International law History
- Publisher: Fondo de Cultura Económica; Secretariat of Foreign Affairs (Mexico)
- Publication date: 1996
- Publication place: Mexico
- Pages: 695
- ISBN: 978-968-16-5234-0
- Preceded by: Origins and Evolution of the Inter-American System
- Followed by: Law and Diplomacy in Inter-American Relations

Diplomacy: Theoretical and Practical Aspects (In Spanish: La diplomacia. Aspectos teóricos y prácticos de su ejercicio profesional) is a 1996 book written by Ismael Moreno Pino, a former ambassador of Mexico and undersecretary of foreign affairs, who was active in promoting nuclear disarmament during the Cold War.

== Summary ==
The book seeks to provide a practical and theoretical framework for the study and practice of diplomacy in the context of a rapidly evolving world order in the early 21st century.

Technological innovation, particularly in the field of telecommunications, and the collapse of socialism in Eastern Europe transformed international relations. In the aftermath of the Cold War, the widespread implementation of neoliberal policies modified geopolitics in the context of globalism. Diplomacy (defined as, "the art, science or practice of conducting negotiations between countries") had to adapt to play a different role. For Developing countries, foreign transactions constitute one of their survival priorities and mean a constant risk to their sovereignty and self-determination in the face of the advances of the industrialized countries; hence the need to establish a model for both diplomacy and democracy which is capable of creating favorable grounds for peaceful understanding between Nations.

The book consists of 12 chapters. Due to its content, it can be divided into four parts:

1. The historical and theoretical framework of international relations: the emergence of some forms of organized diplomacy. The text addresses the historical confusion that has arisen between foreign policy, international law, international relations, and diplomatic work. In this regard, it offers the theses of the most recognized specialists to clarify these points;
2. The historical evolution of diplomatic work
3. The diplomatic structure: the establishment of diplomatic missions, their personnel, the agreements that regulate them, as well as their rights, obligations, immunities, among other aspects.
4. The evolution of parliamentary diplomacy

== Analysis of the Ten Tragic Days from a diplomatic perspective ==
In his book, Moreno Pino dedicates an entire section to the response of the diplomatic corps accredited in Mexico to the Ten Tragic Days, a military coup d'état that occurred during one of the most violent period of the Mexican Revolution. The coup overthrew the first democratically elected government in Mexico's history, headed by president Francisco I. Madero and vice-president José María Pino Suárez, the author's grandfather.

At the time, the US government was in the midst of a transfer of power: the outgoing Taft administration was about to hand power to Woodrow Wilson, then the president-elect. Taft, a lame-duck president, favored non-intervention. Wilson, meanwhile, was very close to the Madero administration and rejected the idea of replacing a popularly-elected liberal democrat with a military dictatorship. In stark contrast, Henry Lane Wilson, the U.S. ambassador to Mexico, personally disliked Madero and Pino Suárez. In his dispatches to the White House and the State Department, he exaggerated the gravity of the situation, pleading that the U.S. government employ gunboat diplomacy to force the collapse of the Madero government. In Mexico, he used his significant influence as dean of the diplomatic corps to exert pressure on Madero and Pino Suárez to resign. Taking advantage of the power vacuum in Washington, D.C., the U.S ambassador backed the coup d'état. Moreno Pino describes his actions, which were beyond his remit, as ultra vires.

Meanwhile, Manuel Márquez Sterling, the ambassador of Cuba, used his influence to ensure that José Miguel Gómez, the president of Cuba, granted Madero and Pino Suárez diplomatic asylum. Once the Madero administration was overthrown by the military, Márquez Sterling tried to ensure that the new de facto government, headed by Victoriano Huerta, granted safe conduct to the deposed leaders so they could leave the country. Instead, Huerta ordered both men assassinated.

He also examines the conduct of Pedro Lascurain, the foreign secretary, who treasoned Madero and Pino Suárez by handing their resignations over to Huerta before both men were safe and sound. In so doing, he failed to comply with the instructions he has received from the president.

Reflecting on this, Moreno Pino concludes that:

"In this narrative, we have seen a foreign secretary too weak in his convictions, unable to give things their proper value, indecisive and misguided — if not altogether malevolent — in his actions. We also saw an obsequious diplomatic corps, meekly acting on the directives of its grim and obstinate dean. The United States did not share the good fortune that Cuba had in finding itself represented at that time by a first-class diplomat with exemplary conduct. The American people, with their great love for democracy and tradition of practicing it, should certainly have deserved a different kind of representative." – Ismael Moreno Pino

== Reviews ==
José Luis Siqueiros Prieto, a distinguished jurist, wrote the prologue to Diplomacy: Theoretical and Practical Aspects and he noted that:

"It is somewhat surprising that given the large bibliography available on public international law, the collection of works on Diplomatic Law is rather limited. Leaving aside the already classic texts by Antokoletz, Cahier, Calvo, Nicolson, Pradier-Fodéré and Vidal y Saura, the most recent of them published more than two decades ago, no new work has been published in that discipline ... a work such as the one being discussed, was absent from the national bibliography. It is for this reason, truly satisfying that ... this book – which is not an essay or manual, but a true treatise on the subject – has been published. The author of the work is Ambassador Ismael Moreno Pino, who, in addition to [his] academic credentials, brings to the table a life devoted to Mexican diplomacy ... In this work, written with scientific rigor and the methodology of the academic, ambassador Moreno Pino analyzes the entire scope and nature of diplomatic relations, not only from a doctrinal perspective, but also with the brushstrokes of his own experiences in the interesting world of diplomatic missions abroad qualifying his teachings with interesting case studies such as that of the so-called Ten Tragic Days... In sum, this work is worthy of being read by all scholars of international and diplomatic law both in Mexico and abroad. It is a valuable addition to the limited bibliography of this important discipline." – José Luis Siqueiros Prieto, attorney-at-Law, founding partner of Hogan Lovells BSTL and former chair of the Inter-American Judicial Committee of the Organization of American States.

Meanwhile, Isolda Navarro Sommerz, a diplomat, commented that:

Modern diplomacy has been an indispensable instrument for promoting national interests and strengthening respect for the rights of nations. The daily work of the current diplomat has made it possible to consolidate these advances and expand the opportunities and quality of life of all peoples through cooperation mechanisms, agreements and international treaties. In this way, the complex relationships between modern States in the pursuit of national interest and their international relations are exposed and analyzed by the author in a clear and precise way. This work is – for scholars of international relations, politicians, diplomats, or students – an extraordinary source of knowledge and training. The content and development of the topics that Ambassador Moreno Pino carries out reflects an exhaustive investigation of the origin, evolution and current state of diplomacy. On the one hand, it contains references to the most important thinkers and theorists; on the other hand, it includes detailed information about the content and operation of the most relevant international agreements, which define and regulate diplomatic activity today, which gives it great value as an obligatory reference work for consultation. – Isolda Navarro Sommerz writing in Mexican Foreign Policy Magazine.

Finally, José de Jesús López Almejo, an international relations scholar, noted that "as someone who has practiced diplomacy throughout his life, Moreno Pino has the ability to study the subject, even at the level of heads of state and government" going on to note that Diplomacy stood out for "the richness of its prose and the precision and clarity of its content, which, without ceasing to be technical, specialized and conducive to the object of study, approaches diplomacy through a classic, historic, and legal perspective."

== Chapters ==
1. Scope and nature of international relations
2. Historical development of diplomacy
3. Sources of diplomatic law
4. Establishment and termination of the diplomatic mission
5. Diplomacy through heads of state, heads of government and foreign ministers
6. Structure and composition of the diplomatic mission
7. Functions of the diplomatic mission: limits to its actions
8. Privileges and immunities
9. Special missions
10. The diplomatic corps: communications in diplomacy
11. The execution of diplomatic work
12. Parliamentary diplomacy.

== Bibliography ==
- Moreno Pino, Ismael. Derecho y diplomacia en las relaciones interamericanas (in Spanish). Mexico, D.F.: Secretaría de Relaciones Exteriores, Fondo de Cultura Económica. ISBN 968-16-5995-3. OCLC 42682344.
