= Embassy of Mexico, Berlin =

Mexican Embassy, Berlin
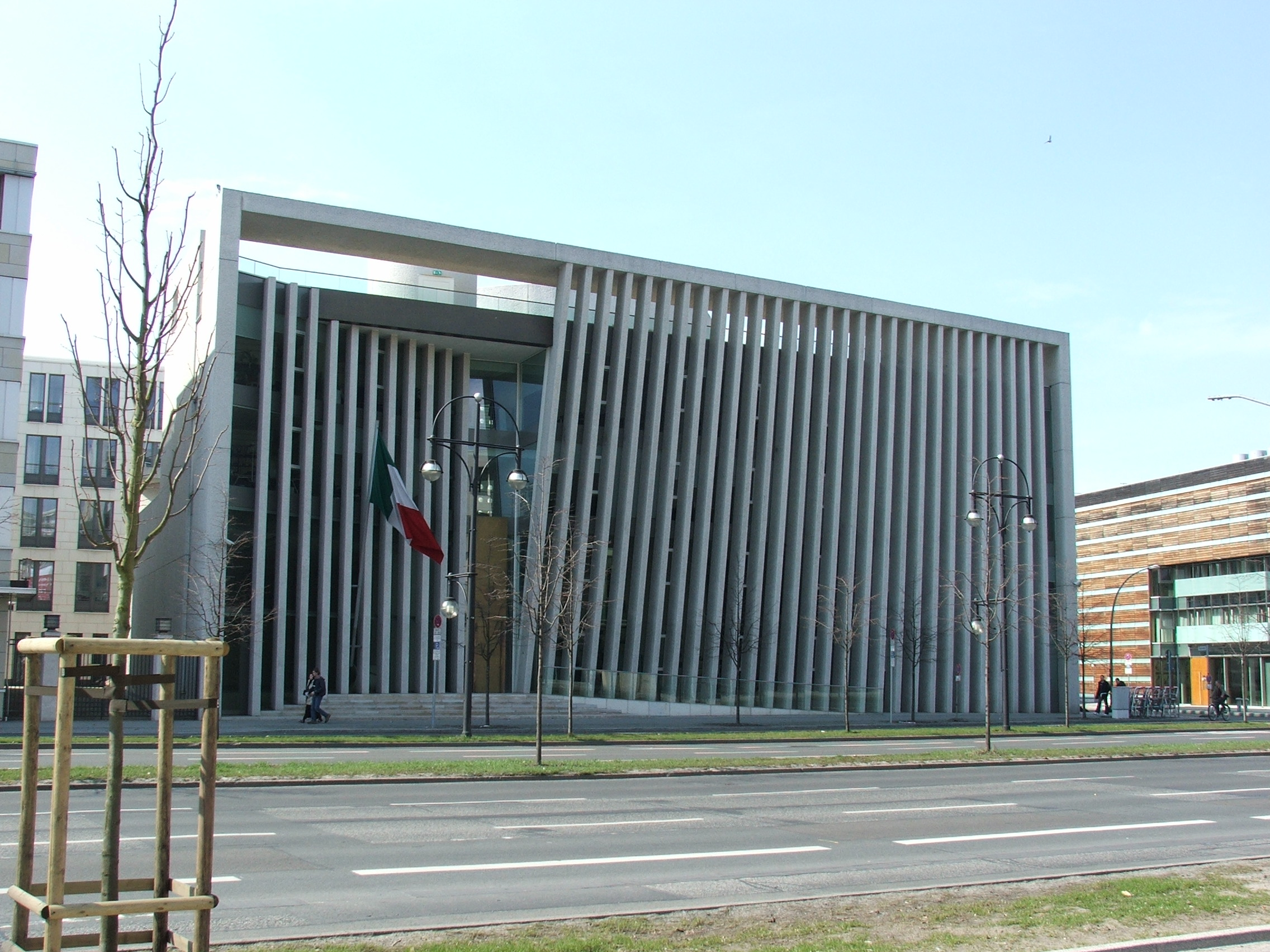
- The Embassy building in Berlin
- Location: Berlin, Germany
- Address: 3 Klingelhöferstrasse, 10785 Berlin, Germany
- Coordinates: 52.5081°N 13.3512°E
- Ambassador: Francisco Quiroga
- Website: Mexican Embassy, Berlin

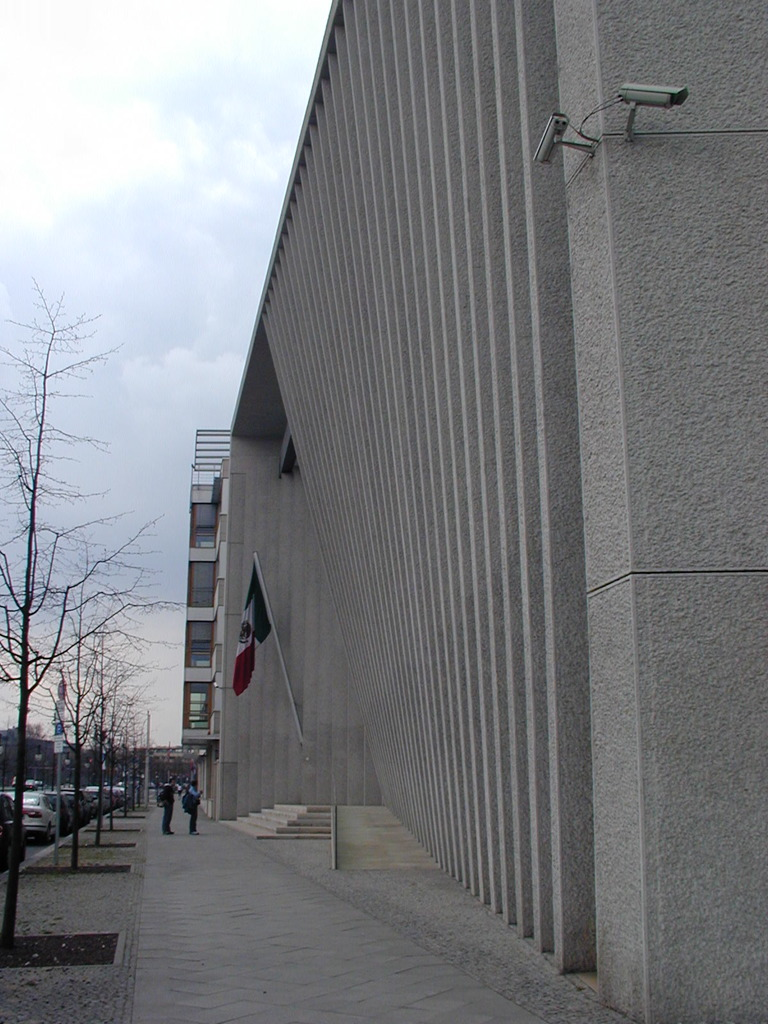
Mexican Embassy in Berlin (Side View)

The Embassy of Mexico in Berlin is the diplomatic mission of Mexico to Germany. The embassy is located in Klingelhöferstrasse 3, Berlin-Mitte.

The building was designed by architect Francisco Serrano, in collaboration with Teodoro González de León.

== Ambassadors of Mexico to Germany ==
- Presidency of Gustavo Díaz Ordaz (1964–1970)
  - (1964–1965): Mario Armando Amador Durón
  - (1965–1970): Manuel de Jesús Cabrera Maciá
- Presidency of Luis Echeverría (1970–1976)
  - (1970–1971): Manuel de Jesús Cabrera Maciá
  - (1971–1972): Antonio Ruiz Galindo
  - (1972–1973): Ismael Moreno Pino
  - (1973–1974): Luis Jesús Weckmann Muñoz
  - (1974–1976): Vicente Sánchez Gavito
- Presidency of José López Portillo (1976–1982)
  - (1976–1977): Ulises Sergio Schmill Ordóñez
  - (1977–1978): Felipe Raúl Valdez Aguilar
  - (1978–1979): Roberto de Rosenzweig-Díaz Azmitia
  - (1979–1982): Octaviano Campos Salas
- Presidency of Miguel de la Madrid (1982–1988)
  - (1982–1987): César Sepúlveda Gutiérrez
  - (1987–1988): Adolfo Enrique Hegewish Fernández
- Presidency of Carlos Salinas de Gortari (1988–1994)
  - (1988–1990): Adolfo Enrique Hegewish Fernández
  - (1990–1994): Juan José Bremer
- Presidency of Ernesto Zedillo (1994–2000)
  - (1994–1998): Juan José Bremer
  - (1998–2000): Roberto Emilio Friedrich Heinze
- Presidency of Vicente Fox (2000–2006)
  - (2000–2002): Patricia Espinosa Cantellano
  - (2002–2003): Jorge Eduardo Navarrete López
  - (2003–2006): Jorge Castro-Valle Kuehne
- Presidency of Felipe Calderón Hinojosa (2006–2012)
  - (2006–2009): Jorge Castro-Valle Kuehne
  - (2010–2012): Francisco González Díaz
- Presidency of Enrique Peña Nieto (2012–2018)
  - (2012–2013): Francisco González Díaz
  - (2013–2018): Patricia Espinosa Cantellano
- Presidency of Andrés Manuel López Obrador (2018–Present)
  - (2018–2019): Patricia Espinosa Cantellano
  - (2019–2021): Rogelio Granguillhome Morfin
  - (2021– ): Francisco Quiroga

== See also ==
- Foreign relations of Mexico
- Germany–Mexico relations
- List of diplomatic missions of Mexico
