= Centro de Investigación y Docencia Económicas =

University in Mexico

Coordinates: 19°22′28″N 99°15′49″W

Center for Economic Research and Teaching
- Centro de Investigación y Docencia Económicas
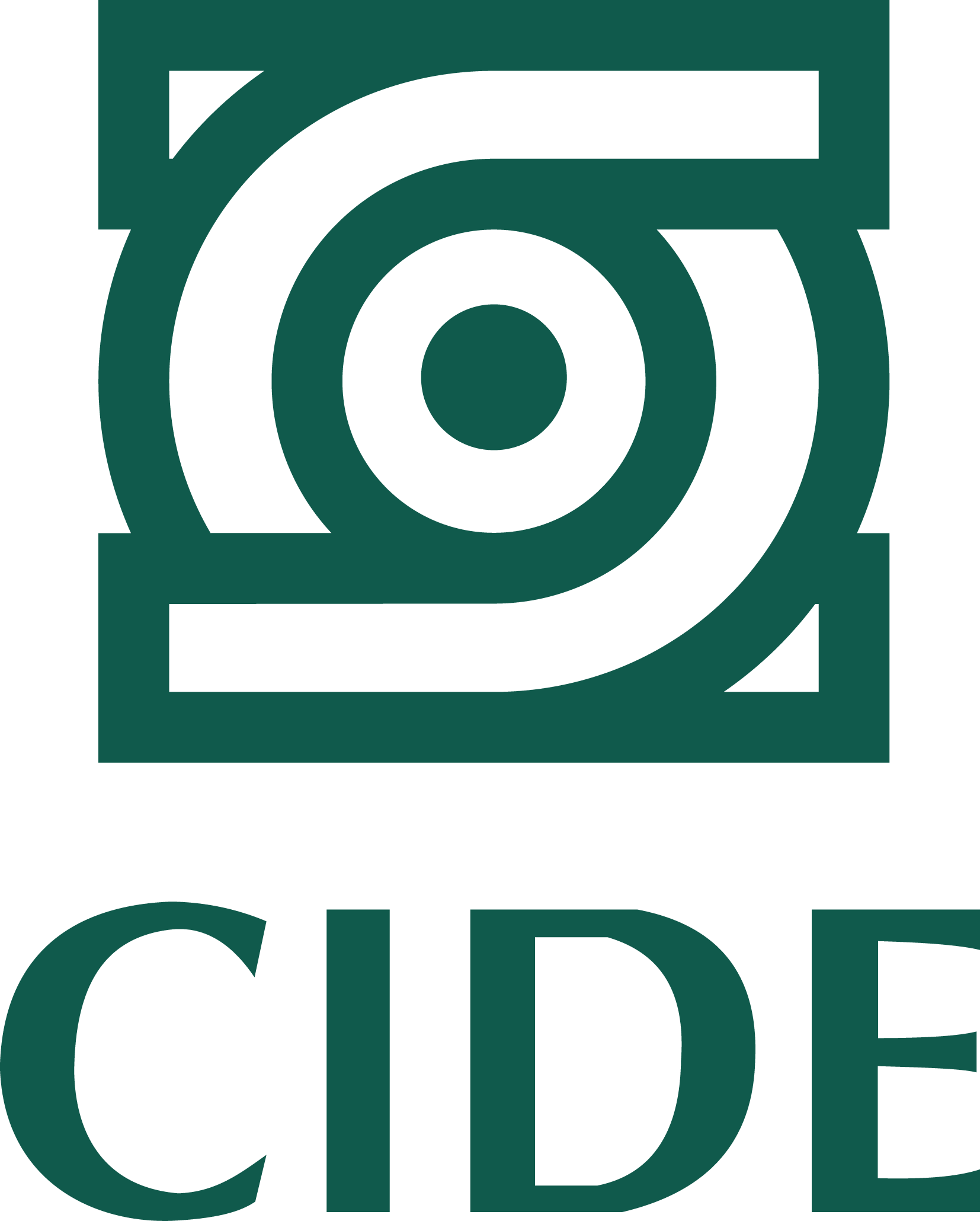
- Type: Public research university
- Established: 25 November 1974
- Founder: Trinidad Martínez Tarragó
- Affiliations: Consejo Nacional de Humanidades, Ciencias y Tecnologías
- Rector: José Antonio Romero Tellaeche
- Students: 490 (as of 2022)
- Undergraduates: 336 (as of 2022)
- Postgraduates: 154 (as of 2022)
- Location: México-Toluca highway 3655, Lomas de Santa Fe, Mexico City, Mexico
- Campus: Multiple sites
- Colors: Green / White
- Website: www.cide.edu

The Centro de Investigación y Docencia Económicas ("Center for Economic Research and Teaching"; CIDE) is a Mexican center of research and higher education, specialized in the fields of social sciences, with an international-grade level of excellence. It is financed with public resources. It has been consistently included in the Global Go To Think Tank reports as one of Mexico's top ten think tanks.

The main campus is located in the Santa Fe hills of Mexico City, with another campus in the city of Aguascalientes in the north-central region of Mexico.

== Academic organization ==
CIDE has seven academic divisions: Economics, Public Administration, International Studies, Political Studies, Legal Studies, History and Multidisciplinary Studies.

The center's organizational structure reflects its pluralistic roots and its orientation towards promoting leadership and innovation. This flexibility allows faculty and alumni to pursue both individual interests and institutional priorities related to CIDE's three core functions: teaching, research, and outreach to the public and decision-makers.

== Faculty ==
The diverse faculty at CIDE form a research community. Investigative work combines scientific rigor with social relevance; it aims to address the challenges Mexico faces. The academic staff is both Mexican and foreign and the majority are registered with the National System of Researchers.

== Academic programs ==
CIDE currently offers four undergraduate programs:

- Political Science and International Relations
- Economics
- Law
- Public Policy

Six full-time masters programs:

- Economics
- Public Administration and Policy
- Environmental Economics
- Political Science
- International History
- Methods for Public Policy Analysis

Two half time masters programs:

- Public Management
- Journalism and Public Policy

Three PhD programs:

- Public Policy
- Political Science
- Applied History

== Distinguished faculty ==
Distinguished former/current residents/professors/researchers of CIDE include:

- José Miguel Insulza, Chilean interior minister, Secretary General of the Organization of American States
- Rodrigo Malmierca Díaz, Cuban diplomat, United Nations Permanent Representative
- Bernardo Sepúlveda Amor, Mexican foreign secretary, International Court of Justice judge
- Pedro Vuskovic, Chilean economist and politician, Economics Minister under Salvador Allende
- Javier Laynez Potizek, Mexican jurist, Justice at the Second Chamber of the Supreme Court of Justice of the Nation
- Arturo Zaldívar Lelo de Larrea, Mexican jurist, Justice at the First Chamber of the Supreme Court of Justice of the Nation
- Ana Laura Magaloni Kerpel, Mexican jurist, Congresswoman at the Constituent Assembly of Mexico City
- Leticia Bonifaz Alfonzo, Mexican jurist, President of the Human Rights Direction at the Supreme Court of Justice of the Nation
- Eduardo Sojo, Mexican economist and politician.
- Max Diener Sala, Mexican jurist, Tax Attorney General of Mexico.
- Jean Meyer, Mexican historian.
- Kurt Unger, Economist.
- David Miklos, Mexican writer.
- Reyes Rodríguez Mondragón, Mexican jurist, Former Dean of the CIDE Law School, Judge at the Superior Chamber of The Electoral Tribunal of the Federal Judiciary
- Olga Pellicer, Mexican diplomat.
