= OPANAL =

Anti-nuclear organization in the Americas

Treaty of Tlatelolco
- Agency for the Prohibition of Nuclear Weapons in Latin America and the Caribbean
- Organismo para la Proscripción de las Armas Nucleares en la América Latina y el Caribe
- Formation: 14 February 1967; 59 years ago
- Headquarters: Mexico City
- Coordinates: 19.430300669802634°N 99.1762573553604°W
- Official language: Spanish
- Secretary General: Flávio Roberto Bonzanini
- Website: www.opanal.org

The OPANAL (Organismo para la Proscripción de las Armas Nucleares en la América Latina y el Caribe) is an international organization which promotes a non-aggression pact and nuclear disarmament in much of the Americas. In English, its name is the Agency for the Prohibition of Nuclear Weapons in Latin America and the Caribbean. The agency was created as a result of the Treaty of Tlatelolco, signed in 1967 and ratified in 1969, which forbids its signatory nations from using, storing, or transporting nuclear weapons.

The first Secretary General was Leopoldo Benites of Ecuador.

== Organization ==
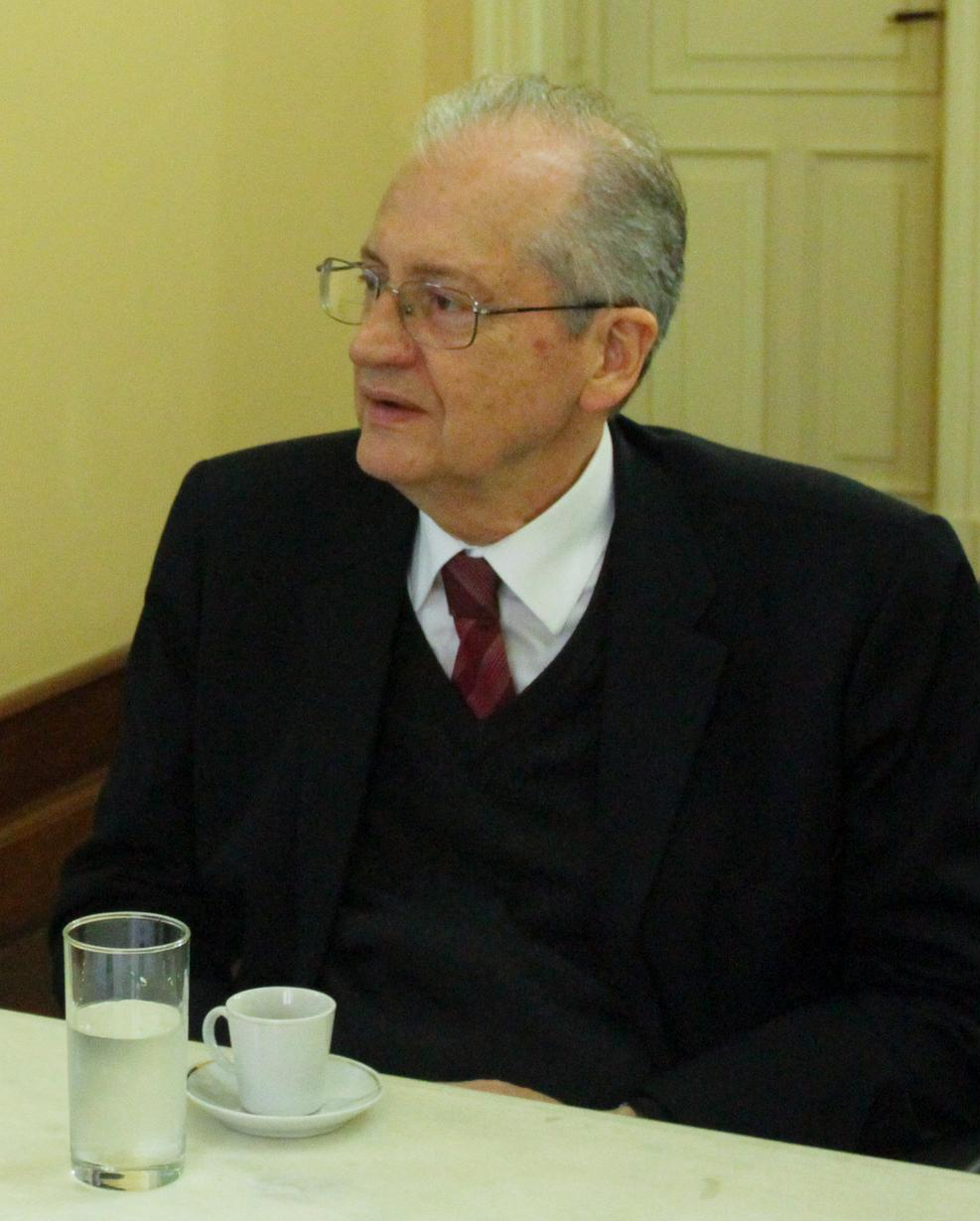
Flávio Roberto Bonzanini in 2017

OPANAL is based in Mexico City, Mexico. It generally holds a General Conference of member nations every two years, as well as special sessions when needed. The governing bodies are the Council and Secretariat (headed by the Secretary General), both of which are elected by General Conference.

The current Secretary General is Flávio Roberto Bonzanini.

== Function ==
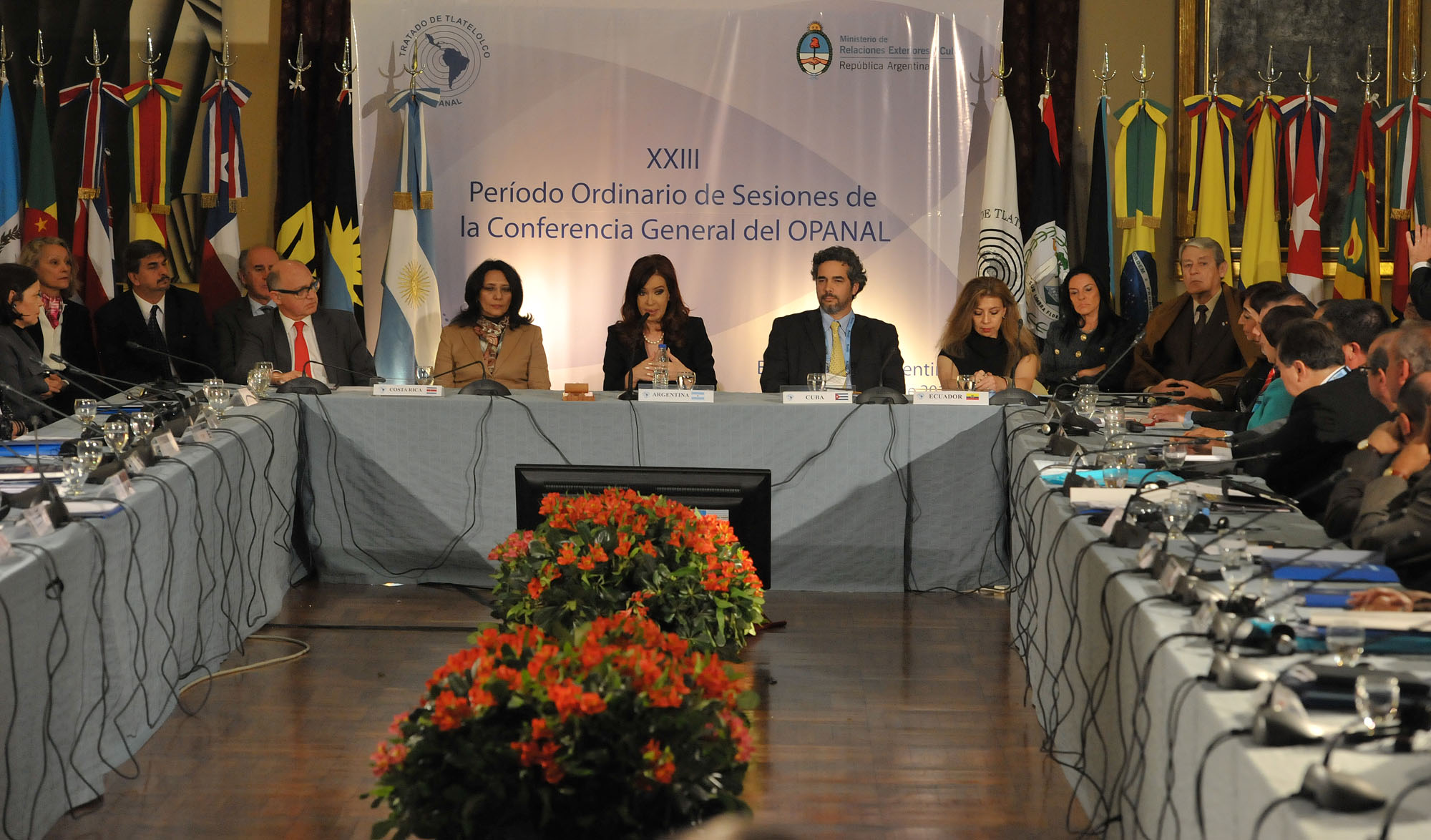
2013 General Conference in Argentina

The organization ensures compliance with the Treaty of Tlatelolco. It facilitates meetings between member nations, participates in other international conferences, and provides input for publications on the subject of nuclear disarmament.

OPANAL is noted as an example of the ways that middle powers can leverage soft power to address global problems, through coalition building, diplomatic pressure, and playing intermediary roles between larger powers.

== History ==
After the Cuban Missile Crisis in October 1962, the Mexican government began pursuing denuclearization in Latin America. International conferences were held with Mexican leadership, and the drafting of the Treaty of Tletelolco in 1967 was a culmination of these efforts. OPANAL was the first international organization to achieve agreements for nuclear disarmament in a densely populated area.

== Member nations ==
Members include 33 countries in Latin America and the Caribbean. Cuba was the last country in the region to join; they signed the treaty in 1995 and ratified it in 2002, and the 2003 General Conference was held in Havana.

- Antigua and Barbuda
- Argentina
- Bahamas
- Barbados
- Belize
- Bolivia
- Brazil
- Chile
- Colombia
- Costa Rica
- Cuba
- Dominica
- Dominican Republic
- Ecuador
- El Salvador
- Grenada
- Guatemala
- Guyana
- Haiti
- Honduras
- Jamaica
- Mexico
- Nicaragua
- Panama
- Paraguay
- Peru
- Saint Kitts and Nevis
- Saint Lucia
- Saint Vincent and the Grenadines
- Suriname
- Trinidad and Tobago
- Uruguay
- Venezuela

== See also ==
- Anti-nuclear organizations
- Association of Caribbean States
- Chemical Weapons Convention
- Community of Latin American and Caribbean States
- Comprehensive Nuclear-Test-Ban Treaty
- Convention on Certain Conventional Weapons
- De-escalation
- Havana Conference (1940)
- International Atomic Energy Agency
- International Campaign to Abolish Nuclear Weapons
- Latin America–United States relations
- Mexico and weapons of mass destruction
- Non-Aligned Movement
- Nuclear Weapons: The Road to Zero
- South Pacific Nuclear Free Zone Treaty
