= Bernardo Sepúlveda Amor =

Mexican diplomat and jurist (born 1941)

Vice President of the International Court of Justice
- In office 6 February 2012 – 6 February 2015
- President: Peter Tomka
- Preceded by: Peter Tomka
- Succeeded by: Abdulqawi Yusuf

Judge of the International Court of Justice
- In office 6 February 2006 – 6 February 2015
- Preceded by: Francisco Rezek
- Succeeded by: Patrick Lipton Robinson

Secretary of Foreign Affairs
- In office 1 December 1982 – 30 November 1988
- President: Miguel de la Madrid
- Preceded by: Jorge Castañeda
- Succeeded by: Fernando Solana

Ambassador of Mexico to the United States
- In office 16 March 1982 – 30 November 1982
- President: José López Portillo
- Preceded by: Hugo B. Margáin
- Succeeded by: Jorge Espinoza de los Reyes

Personal details
- Born: 14 December 1941 (age 84) Mexico City, Mexico
- Party: Institutional Revolutionary Party (PRI)
- Relatives: Pita Amor
- Education: National Autonomous University; Queens' College, Cambridge
- Profession: Diplomat; jurist

Bernardo Sepúlveda Amor (born 14 December 1941) is a Mexican diplomat and jurist. He was Secretary of Foreign Affairs during the 1980s under President Miguel de la Madrid and is a former judge of the International Court of Justice.

== Biography ==
Bernardo Sepúlveda Amor was born in Mexico City on 14 December 1941. He studied law at the National Autonomous University (UNAM, 1964). He then pursued post-graduate studies, specialising in international law at Queens' College, Cambridge in the United Kingdom (1966).

He is a professor of international law and international organisations at El Colegio de México and also teaches at the Matías Romero Institute. His other academic activities have seen him work at the Centro de Investigación y Docencia Económicas (CIDE) and the UNAM.

From March 16 to November 30, 1982, he served as Ambassador to the United States of America. From 1989 to 1993, he served as Ambassador to the United Kingdom.

Between those two diplomatic postings, from December 1982 to 1988, he served as Secretary of Foreign Affairs under President Miguel de la Madrid. During his time in the Cabinet, he was instrumental in establishing the Contadora Group, which worked to bring peace to Central America, and in the creation of the Grupo de Ocho, since expanded to become the Rio Group.

In 1984, he was awarded the Prince of Asturias Prize for his international co-operation efforts. The following year, UNESCO awarded him its Simón Bolívar Prize.

In 1996, he was elected to serve on the United Nations International Law Commission; he was re-elected to the same position in 2001. On November 7, 2005, he was elected to a nine-year period as one of the judges of the International Court of Justice (ICJ).

In 2012, Sepúlveda-Amor was elected by the judges of the ICJ to serve as its vice-president, for a three-year term beginning February 6, 2012.

In 2017, Sepúlveda-Amor was named chairman of the board of the Altán Redes, a Mexican communication consortium.

In 2018, Sepúlveda-Amor was made Ambassador Emeritus of Mexico in recognition for his contribution both as a jurist and as a diplomat to the betterment of the international reputation of Mexico.

== Lectures ==
- The International Court of Justice and the Use of Force by States in the Lecture Series of the United Nations Audiovisual Library of International Law
- La Corte Internacional de Justicia y el uso de la fuerza por los Estados in the Lecture Series of the United Nations Audiovisual Library of International Law
- The Development of the International Court of Justice Jurisprudence in some key areas in the Lecture Series of the United Nations Audiovisual Library of International Law
