= Mexico and weapons of mass destruction =

Mexico has no nuclear weapons, but it possesses the technical capability to manufacture nuclear weapons. However, it has renounced them and has pledged to only use its nuclear technology for peaceful purposes following the Treaty of Tlatelolco in 1967. In the 1970s, Mexico's National Institute for Nuclear Research (Instituto Nacional de Investigaciones Nucleares, or ININ) successfully achieved the creation of highly enriched uranium, which is used in nuclear power plants and in the construction of nuclear weapons. However, the country agreed in 2012 to downgrade the high enriched uranium used on its nuclear power plants to low enriched uranium. This process was carried out with the assistance of the International Atomic Energy Agency.

== Nuclear energy in Mexico through history ==
Mexico has been using technologies such as X-rays since the late 19th century. Evidence of the use of various radiations and radioisotopes for medical activities since the 1920s exists, practices that strengthened during the next decades alongside the use of industrial scintigraphies. Given its huge importance, the investigation of nuclear sciences formally began in the late 1940s with two fields of interest: energetic and non-energetic applications and the study of nuclear sciences.

The CNEN (Mexico's Nuclear Energy National Committee) started nine programs: nuclear physics, education and training, seminaries, reactors, radioisotopes, industrial applications for nuclear energy, agronomy, genetics and radiologic protection.

During the sixties, the most relevant scientific project on the country was the construction of the Salazar Nuclear Center in the state of Mexico, which started in 1964. Two years later, the center already possessed a tandem Van de Graaff particle accelerator and in 1968 a TRIGA Mark III. In 1972, the CNEN changed its name to ININ (National Institute for Nuclear Research). However, regardless of the new name, its objective remains the same until today.

== Official attitude to nuclear weapons ==
In 1961 the Mexican government argued that the use of nuclear weapons could not be justified under the right to self-defense in the UN charter. Seven years later the country would sign the Treaty of Tlatelolco in which Mexico and several other Latin American countries agreed not to manufacture nuclear weapons and to limit its nuclear technology to peaceful uses.

In 2000, Mexico was one of 7 nations launching a declaration "Towards a Nuclear Weapon Free World: The Need for a New Agenda" calling for further action to implement the provisions of the Treaty on the Non-Proliferation of Nuclear Weapons.

In April 2010, the Mexican government reportedly reached an agreement to turn over its highly enriched uranium to the United States. The US would help convert highly enriched uranium stored at Mexican research facilities into a less enriched form unsuitable for weapons, thus eliminating all highly enriched uranium in Mexico. Later in March 2012 Rachel Maddow reported that all highly enriched uranium had been removed from Mexico.

In October 2010 Mexico signed a contract with the Russian uranium supplier Rosatom, which will supply low enriched uranium (3%, a level of enrichment unsuitable for weapons) for the Mexican nuclear power plant Laguna Verde.

In 2012 Mexico was admitted into the Nuclear Suppliers Group (NSG) as an observer state, which the US claimed as an achievement in preventing nuclear proliferation.

Mexico signed the Treaty on the Prohibition of Nuclear Weapons on September 20, 2017, and ratified it on January 16, 2018.

== See also ==
- Military of Mexico
- Mexican Army
- Mexican Navy
- Agencia Espacial Mexicana
