= Instituto Matías Romero =

The Instituto Matías Romero (IMR) (Matías Romero Institute) is Mexico's diplomatic academy. It was established in 1974 by the Secretariat of Foreign Affairs (SRE) with the purpose of training Mexican diplomats. The IMR is named for Mexican politician and diplomat Matías Romero.

The IMR is a decentralised body of the Secretariat of Foreign Affairs. It aims to:

- Educate, train and update members of the Mexican Foreign Service (SEM), Foreign Ministry staff, as well as staff of other public administration agencies of the three levels of government and the three branches of the Union, through courses and diplomas on current issues in international politics;
- Disseminate Mexico's foreign policy and other international issues through publications, conferences and podcasts, as well as links with other national and foreign educational and academic institutions; and
- Manage and direct the Museo de la Cancillería (Foreign Ministry Museum).

The IMR is also the publisher of Revista Mexicana de Política Exterior (RMPE) (Mexican Journal of Foreign Policy), a quarterly academic journal founded in 1983.
