= Rotonda de los Hombres Ilustres =

The Rotonda de los Hombres Ilustres is a dated named that may refer to:

- Rotonda de los Hombres Ilustres, Chihuahua City
- Rotonda de los Hombres Ilustres, the former name of the Rotonda de las Personas Ilustres at Panteón de Dolores, Mexico City
- Rotonda de los Hombres Ilustres, the former name of the Rotonda de los Jaliscienses Ilustres
