= Pedro Sáinz de Baranda y Borreiro =

Governor of Yucatan
- In office 3 January 1835 – 18 February 1835
- Preceded by: Francisco de Paula Toro
- Succeeded by: Sebastián López de Llergo

Governor of Yucatan
- In office 22 June 1835 – 27 August 1835
- Preceded by: Sebastián López de Llergo
- Succeeded by: José de la Cruz Villamil

Personal details
- Born: Pedro Sainz de Baranda y Borreiro; 13 March 1787 San Francisco de Campeche, New Spain
- Died: 16 December 1845 (aged 58) Mérida, Yucatán, Mexico
- Resting place: Campeche Cathedral (1845–1987); Rotunda of Illustrious Persons (1987–present)
- Party: Liberal Party
- Spouse: María Joaquina Quijano Cosgaya
- Children: Pedro Baranda Quijano; Perfecto Baranda Quijano; María Josefa Baranda Quijano; Joaquín Baranda Quijano
- Parent(s): Pedro Sáinz de Baranda Cano (father); María Josefa Borreiro y de la Fuente (mother)
- Education: Escuela Naval Militar

Military service
- Branch/service: Spanish Navy; Mexican Navy
- Years of service: 1803–1821 (Spanish Empire); 1821–1830 (Mexico)
- Rank: Captain
- Battles/wars: Battle of Traflagar (Anglo-Spanish War (1796–1808)); Siege of San Juan de Ulúa (Mexican War of Independence)

Pedro Sáinz de Baranda y Borreiro (13 March 1787 – 16 December 1845) was a naval officer, industrialist, and liberal politician who founded the Mexican Navy and led the naval blockade of Veracruz, which ended with the Spanish surrendering San Juan de Ulua Fort in 1825, the last portion of Mexican territory still in Spanish hands. This event is recognized as the culmination of the Mexican War of Independence.

Born in San Francisco de Campeche to a noble Spanish family with a rich political heritage, his father, Pedro Sáinz de Baranda y Cano, was a colonial administrator who served as the Minister of the Treasury under the Spanish Empire. Aged eleven, Sáinz de Baranda embarked to Ferrol, Spain for naval officer training at the Naval Military Academy, joining the Spanish Royal Navy as a Midshipman. He fought in the Battle of Trafalgar, where he served on the battleship Santa Ana, engaging the British fleet despite severe injuries. His valor earned him a promotion to Lieutenant aged eighteen.

During the Mexican War of Independence, he played a significant role in establishing the Mexican Navy. Through a collaborative military and naval effort, he captured the San Juan de Ulúa fortress in Veracruz. As Supreme Commander of the Navy Department, Sáinz de Baranda held the highest operational naval position of the time. He also engaged in various public roles, including being elected to the Cortes of Cádiz, which were tasked with drafting the Spanish Constitution of 1812 and, afterward, was also elected to the Constituent Assembly which drafted the Mexican Constitution of 1824. A member of the Liberal Party, he served as Mayor of Valladolid, Lieutenant-Governor of Yucatán, and on two occasions as Governor of Yucatán. He also contributed to Mayan culture exploration and established the Aurora Yucateca, Mexico's first mechanized textile factory, "a bold experiment in industrial revolution."

== Early years and participation in the Battle of Trafalgar ==
Born on March 13, 1787, in San Francisco de Campeche, he was the eldest son of Pedro Sáinz de Baranda y Cano (1753–1840), a Spanish colonial administrator and hidalgo who arrived in the New World as the Minister of the Treasury (Ministro de la Real Hacienda), and María Josefa de Borreiro y de la Fuente. The Sáinz de Baranda family, belonging to the Spanish nobility, had a significant presence in liberal politics between the 18th and 20th-centuries in both Spain and Mexico.

One of his relatives, Pedro Sáinz de Baranda y Gorriti, notably served as the first democratically-elected Mayor of Madrid during the Napoleonic invasion of the Iberian Peninsula, defending the city valiantly.

At the age of 11, in 1798, Sáinz de Baranda embarked on a merchant ship bound for Spain to receive naval officer training. He officially joined the Spanish army on October 18, 1803, as a Midshipman (guardíamarina). By November 1804, he was promoted to Sub-Lieutenant (alférez de fragata) while serving aboard the San Fulgencio, a ship-of-the-line, under Domingo Pérez de Grandallana's command.

In 1796, inspired by Napoleon's military successes, especially the Rhine Campaign and the Italian Campaign, Manuel Godoy, the Spanish Prime Minister, signed the Second Treaty of San Ildefonso, establishing a Franco-Spanish alliance against Great Britain. The Treaty of Amiens (1802) provided a temporary truce, but hostilities resumed after the British attacked a Spanish squadron carrying precious metals to Cádiz two years later.

At the time, Sáinz de Baranda served on the Santa Ana battleship, part of a squadron led by Admiral Federico Gravina. The squadron encountered Admiral Horatio Nelson's British fleet off Cape Trafalgar. During the battle, the Santa Ana engaged HMS Royal Sovereign, a British ship-of-the-line commanded by Cuthbert Collingwood, 1st Baron Collingwood.

Despite British naval superiority, Santa Ana was able to engage HMS Royal Sovereign for about six hours in a fierce struggle until, due to the high number of casualties and severe injuries suffered by her crew, including Commander Alava and Sainz de Baranda himself, who sustained three dangerously severe wounds, the Spanish ship was forced to surrender. However, it was later rescued by the Spanish ships Asís, Montañes, and Rayo. After the Battle of Trafalgar, Sáinz de Baranda, a decorated hero, earned a promotion to lieutenant (teniente) at the age of eighteen.

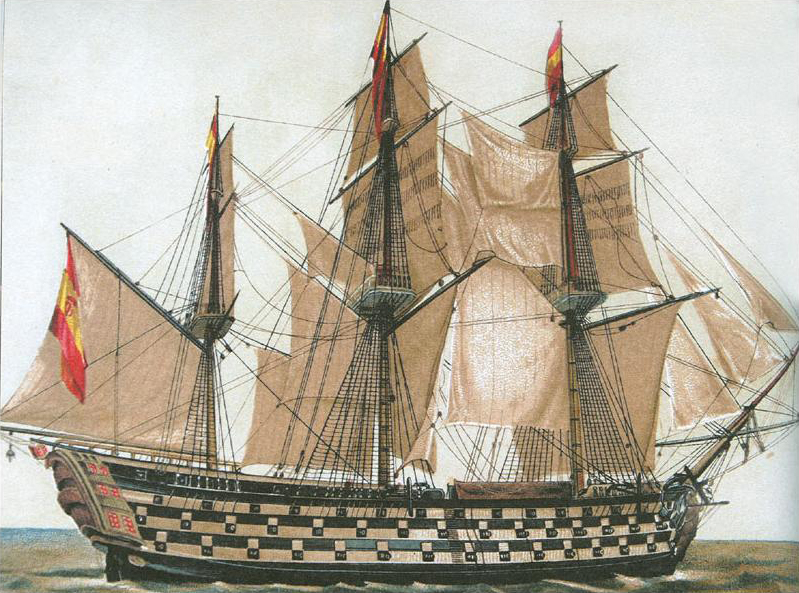
A 19th-century engraving of the Santa Ana (1784). As a young officer in the Spanish Navy, Sáinz de Baranda fought in the Battle of Trafalar (1805).

The severe injuries Sáinz de Baranda had received in the Battle of Trafalgar didn't allow him to continue in active service, and he returned to the San Fulgencio, from which he was discharged on March 6, 1806, to enroll in the Spanish Marine Infantry (Cuerpo de Batallones de Marina). On October 1, 1806, he embarked on the battleship Príncipe de Asturias.

Between 1806 and 1808, Sáinz de Baranda continued in the service of the Spanish Navy, battling the English enemy while commanding a 44-gun gunboat, in addition to leading several convoys. He once again distinguished himself in a wartime action in Chipiona, Spain, and thanks to his performance, a war loot of just over eight thousand rifles was achieved.

In 1808, Sáinz de Baranda embarked on a journey from Europe to the Americas. Upon his arrival in La Guaira, Venezuela, he carried vital documents concerning the power succession crisis between Carlos IV and Fernando VII. Continuing his voyage to Cuba, he eventually returned to his hometown of Campeche in August 1808. It was during this time that he learned about the outbreak of war between France and Spain following Napoleon's invasion of the Iberian Peninsula. Motivated by these events, Sainz de Baranda reoffered his services and assumed the role of Second Commander on the warship Antenor, led by Captain General Benito Pérez Vadelomar. Amidst the Napoleonic Wars, which witnessed Napoleon's forces infiltrating and seizing control of multiple Spanish colonies in the Caribbean, Sáinz de Baranda carried out missions to Havana, Santo Domingo, Pensacola, and engaged in patrols across the Gulf of Mexico.

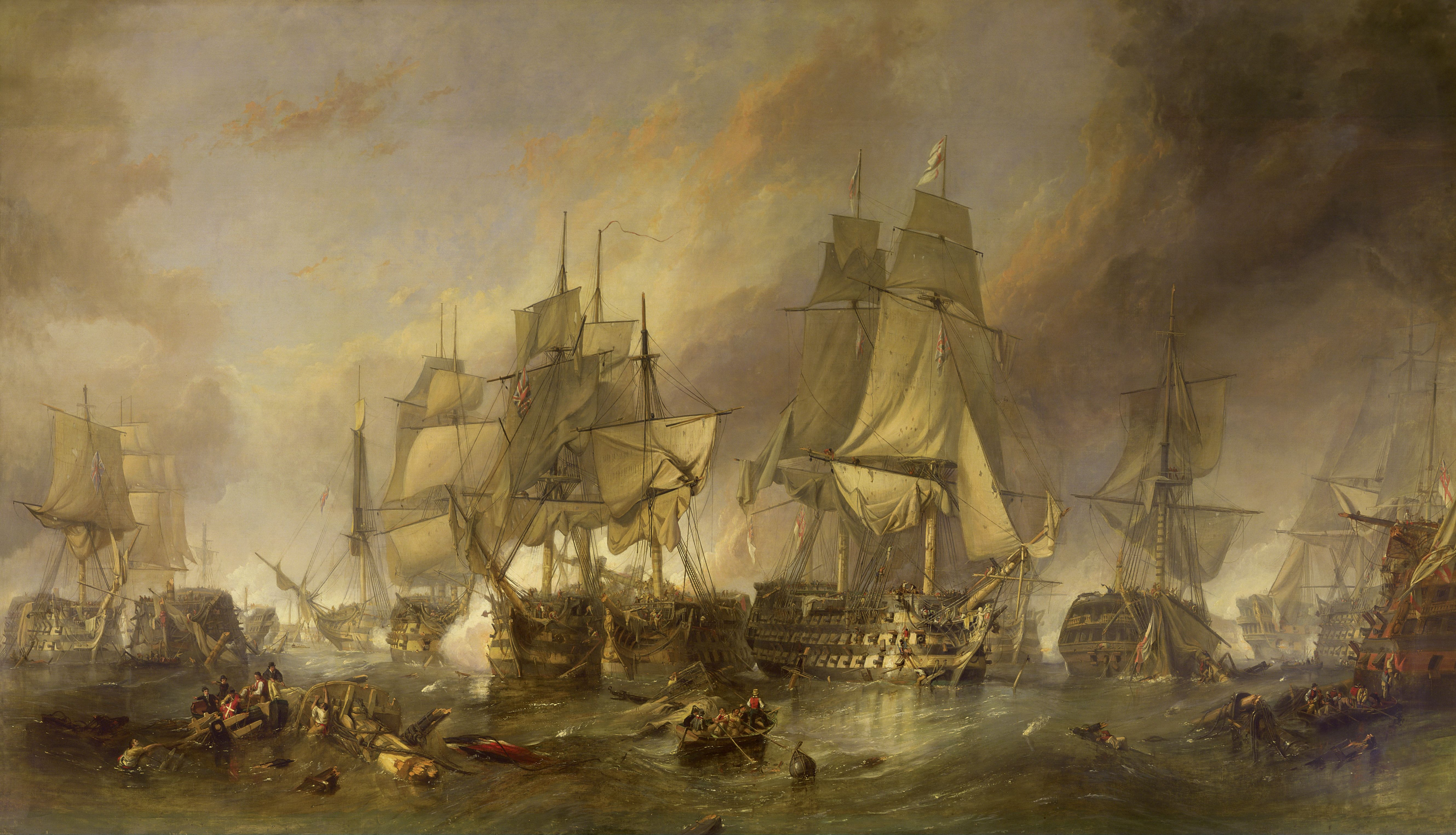
The Battle of Trafalgar (1805)

In 1810, at the age of twenty-three, he was elected as a representative to the Cortes of Cádiz, the body responsible for drafting the Spanish Constitution of 1812.

In 1815, Sáinz de Baranda received orders to travel to Havana to assume command of the Santa Ana. Unfortunately, his health took a significant downturn, prompting Juan Ruiz de Apodaca, the Commander General of the Navy and later the Viceroy of New Spain, to grant him leave for recovery in Campeche. Struggling with severe eye problems that impaired his naval service, Sáinz de Baranda formally requested retirement from the Spanish Navy. Given his health condition, he received a royal order on February 26, 1815, commissioning him to the Army's Corps of Engineers. This role involved overseeing and reinforcing the fortifications of the city.

The Mexican War of Independence had persisted for eleven long years, and on September 27, 1821, the Army of the Three Guarantees under the command of Agustín de Iturbide triumphantly entered Mexico City. The following day, the Treaty of Córdoba, the document formalizing Mexico's Independence, was signed. Yet, this didn't imply complete submission of the Spanish troops who were still present in Mexican territory. In the port of Veracruz, the Spanish garrison resisted these events and withdrew to San Juan de Ulúa, from where they continued their resistance.

During the First Mexican Empire (1821–23), Sáinz de Baranda served in the incipient Mexican Imperial Navy. On December 2, 1822, Antonio López de Santa Ana rose against the Empire, proclaiming the republic. Serving as Commander of Veracruz, Sáinz de Baranda refused to provide Santa Anna with ships from the Imperial Navy. He initiated a counter-revolutionary movement to keep the coastal towns of the Sotavento aligned with the Empire. For this stance, he was promoted to Frigate Captain of the Imperial Navy on January 13, 1823. After the fall of the Mexican Empire, the new Provisional Government of Mexico confirmed Sáinz de Baranda's appointment as Frigate Captain, which had been conferred upon him during the prior regime.

== Foundation of the Mexican Navy and The Battle of San Juan de Ulúa (1825) ==
In the early 1820s, after the consummation of Mexican independence from Spanish colonial rule, the Spanish garrison at San Juan de Ulúa, a formidable fortress located off the coast of Veracruz, remained a stubborn holdout of Spanish dominion. The historical significance of San Juan Ulúa, constructed by Hernán Cortés in 1535, cannot be understated. Throughout the colonial era, it served as the guardian of the Spanish treasure fleet. Even after Mexico's hard-fought independence, Spain clung to the fortress in hopes of reconquering Mexico. Led by Field Marshal José María Dávila García, the Spanish forces in the fortress resisted Mexican sovereignty, using the strategic location to their advantage. The Mexican government, keen on solidifying its newly gained independence, recognized that capturing San Juan de Ulúa was crucial for asserting its authority and securing control over critical coastal areas.

Pedro Sáinz de Baranda, designated as the Commander of the Mexican Navy, assumed the role of constructing a naval force capable of spearheading the eventual conquest of the fortress. Sainz de Baranda's leadership traits, profound maritime knowledge, and unwavering commitment to the Mexican cause rendered him the prime candidate for this formidable task.

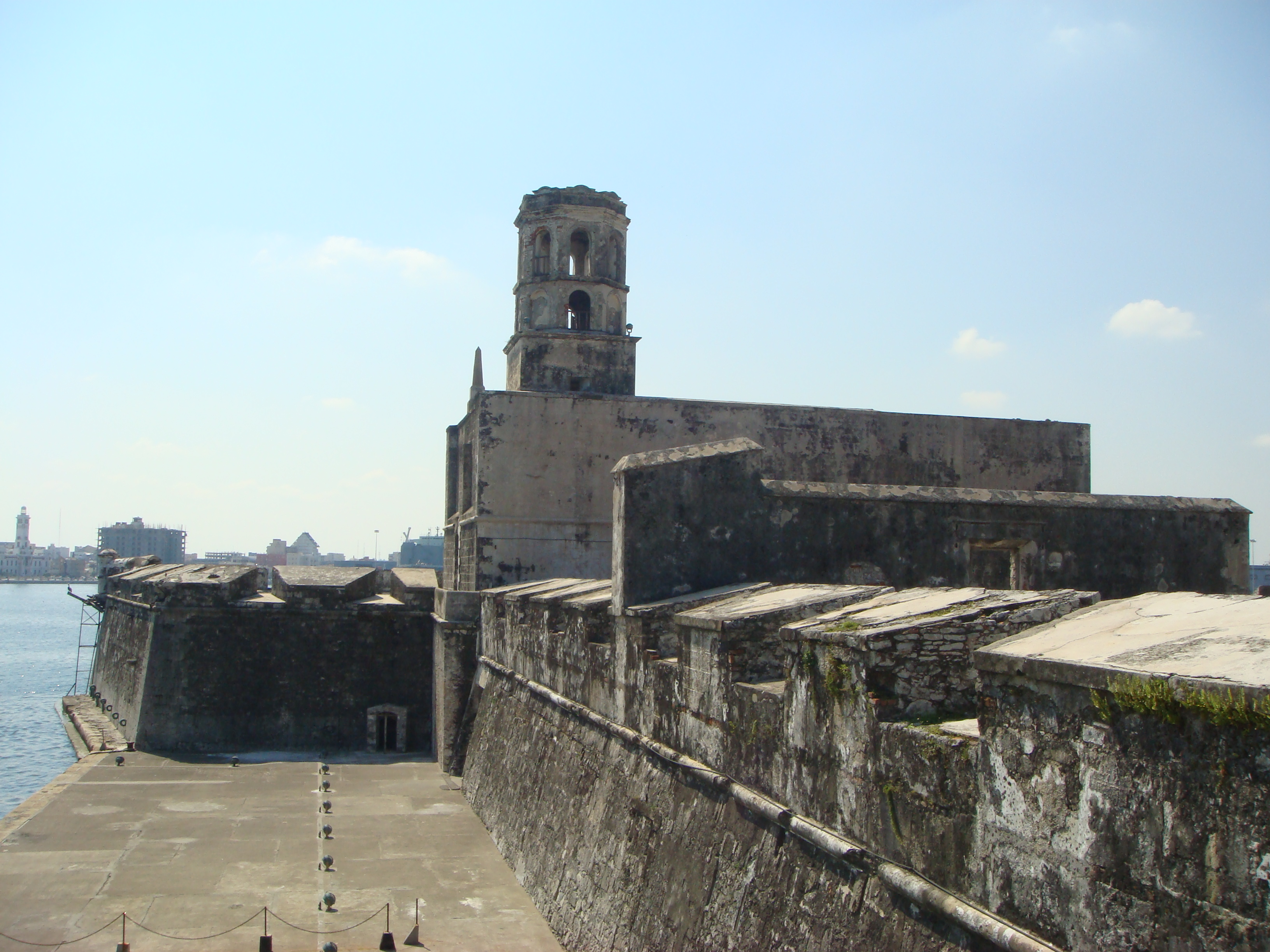
San Juan de Ulúa remained under Spanish control until 1825 when Sáinz de Baranda and Miguel Barragan orchestrated its capture, symbolizing the culmination of Mexico's Independence.

After General Miguel Barragán's land-based assault faltered, Sainz de Baranda orchestrated a plan to sever the Spanish garrison's supply routes. Coordinating a small fleet composed of 200 sailors, 100 gunners, a frigate, and eight corvettes, Sainz de Baranda meticulously planned and executed the naval blockade, methodically situating Mexican naval units in strategic positions to sever supply lines and communication channels to the fortress. Despite facing numerous challenges, including logistical constraints and adverse weather conditions, Sainz de Baranda's determination remained unwavering.

The turning point came in the autumn of 1825 when Spanish reinforcements, including the frigates Sabina and Casilda and the corvette Aretusa, attempted to break the blockade and relieve the garrison at San Juan de Ulúa. Sainz de Baranda skillfully organized the Mexican naval forces to intercept the Spanish convoy. Under his command, the Mexican Navy engaged the Spanish fleet in a fierce and decisive battle, ultimately compelling the Spanish ships to withdraw. This victory not only showcased Sainz de Baranda's strategic prowess but also shattered Spanish hopes of reinforcing the fortress.

Following the naval victory, Sainz de Baranda capitalized on the weakened position of the Spanish forces at San Juan de Ulúa. The Mexican Navy intensified its blockade, cutting off essential supplies and support to the Spanish garrison. The relentless pressure exerted by Sainz de Baranda and his naval forces left the Spanish forces inside the fortress increasingly isolated and demoralized. Recognizing their untenable position, the Spanish forces within San Juan de Ulúa initiated negotiations for surrender. Pedro Sainz de Baranda played a critical role in overseeing the terms of capitulation, ensuring that Mexican interests were safeguarded. On November 13, 1825, the Spanish forces formally surrendered. Through this collaborative military and naval effort, Mexico's sovereignty was irrevocably secured, and Spain relinquished its last vestige of control on Mexican soil.

Pedro Sainz de Baranda's decisive actions and expert coordination of naval operations led to the fortress's surrender, solidifying Mexican control over this critical coastal stronghold. This achievement marked a significant milestone in Mexico's post-independence era and established Sainz de Baranda's legacy as a national hero and naval pioneer. To immortalize the significance of these milestones, Mexico instituted "Navy Day" on November 23, a commemoration solidified by a presidential decree signed by President Carlos Salinas de Gortari. For his role in these events, Pedro Sainz de Baranda is considered the founder of the Mexican Navy.

Sáinz de Baranda held the highest operational naval position of the time as Supreme Commander of the Navy Department. However, due to his fragile health, on December 1, 1825, he wrote to the Provisional Government to request that they accept his resignation as no armed enemies remained against the Nation.

After 1830 he held various public positions, these included serving as Mayor of Valladolid, Lieutenant-Governor of Yucatán and, two periods as Governor of Yucatan. He was also elected to the Constituent Assembly which drafted the Mexican Constitution of 1824.

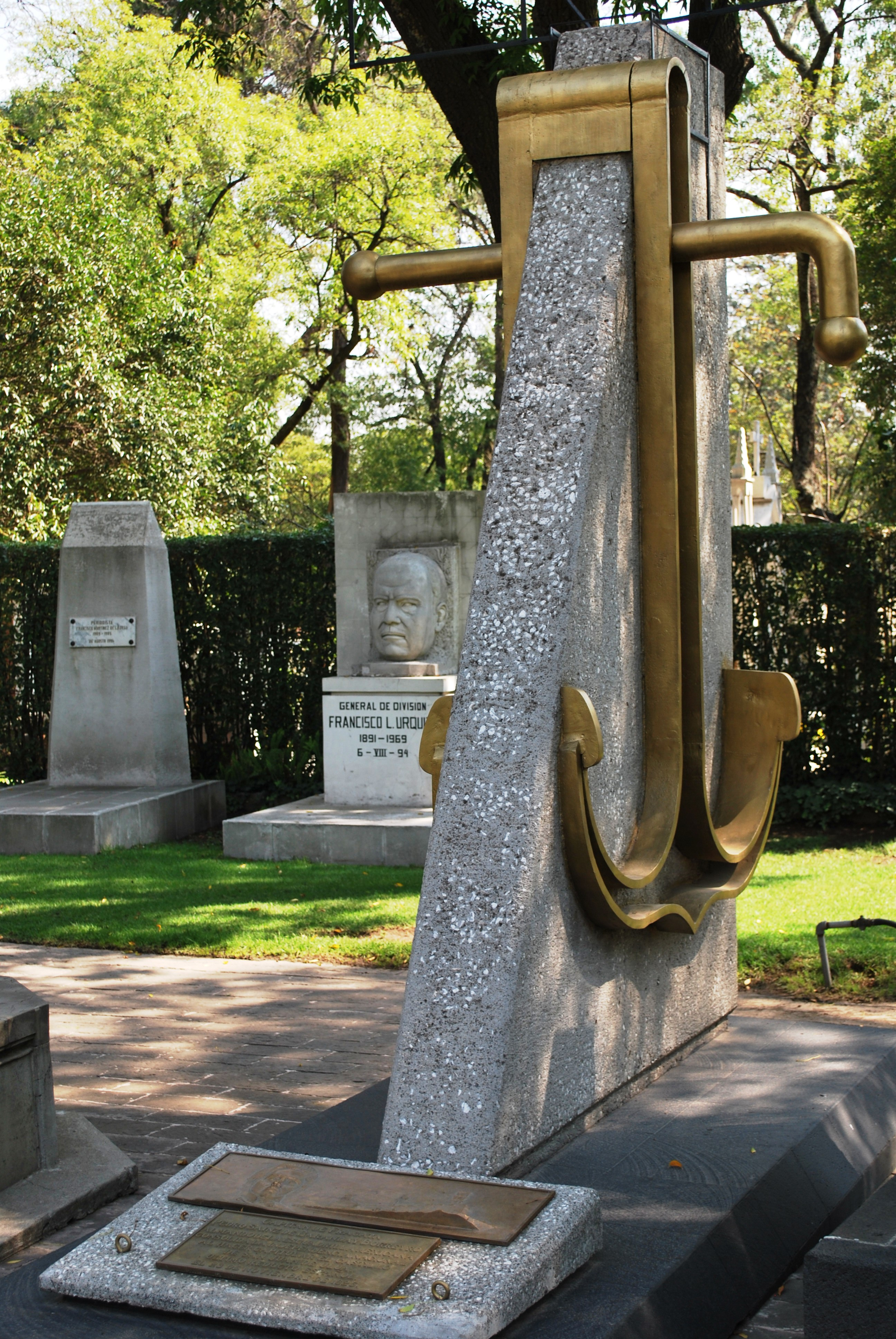
The sepulchre of Pedro Sáinz de Baranda (1787–1845) at the Rotunda of the Illustrious Men

== Industrialist and founder of Aurora de Yucatán ==
In 1834, Pedro Sáinz de Baranda, in partnership with Scottish businessman John McGregor, undertook an endeavor that would shape Mexico's industrial landscape. Together, they established the Aurora Yucateca, the nation's first fully mechanized textile factory to successfully utilize steam power. This pivotal venture is widely acknowledged as the catalyst for introducing the Industrial Revolution to Mexico. The Aurora Yucateca not only marked a groundbreaking leap in textile production but also ignited the engine of industrial progress within the country.

Beyond his industrial pursuits, Sáinz de Baranda's curiosity extended to the realms of culture and exploration. His collaboration with American explorer John Lloyd Stephens bore fruit in their joint research on the enigmatic Mayan civilization of the Yucatán peninsula. This collaboration played a pivotal role in enhancing our understanding of Mayan culture. Their combined efforts were instrumental in the creation of a work that remains celebrated to this day: Incidents of Travel in Yucatán co-authored by Stephens and artist Frederick Catherwood.

The remarkable progress achieved by Aurora de Yucatán encountered a formidable challenge during the Caste War of Yucatán. This conflict disrupted the thriving textile industry and forced the factory to cease operations. The widespread destruction that characterized this period unfortunately enveloped Aurora de Yucatán, leading to its closure. This chapter of unrest marked a significant setback for both the industrial sector and the region as a whole. It wasn't until 1854 that Gregorio Zambrano founded another mechanized textile factory in Monterrey.

Sáinz de Baranda died in Mérida on 16 December 1845 at the age of 58. His remains were deposited in Campeche Cathedral. In March 1987, President Miguel de la Madrid instructed that his remains should be transferred, with the corresponding military honors, to the Rotunda of the Illustrious Persons in Mexico City.

== Family ==
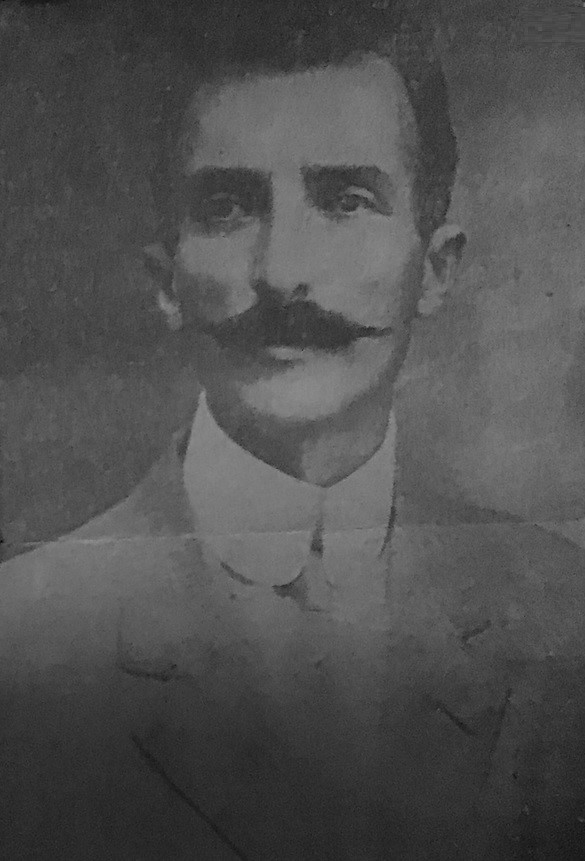
José María Pino Suárez, the Vicepresident of Mexico (1911 - 13), was his great-grandson.

He married María Joaquina Quijano y Cosgaya, a member of the Quijano family, a lineage deeply entrenched in Yucatán's power structure, with family members strategically positioned in key roles within the local government, business, the ecclesiastical hierarchy, and military leadership.

The couple had four children: Pedro, Perfecta, María Josefa and Joaquín.

Additionally, Sáinz de Baranda was the stepfather of General Francisco Cantón, a conservative politician and military figure who served as the governor of Yucatán from 1898 to 1902, modernizing the region's infrastructure and encouraging economic growth. He had fought in the Castes War and supported Emperor Maximilian's rule during the Second French Intervention. He later supported Porfirio Díaz's Plan of Tuxtepec in 1876.

Pedro Sáinz de Baranda's legacy continued through his descendants, who left their mark on Mexico's political and social landscape. During the 19th century, the Baranda family became part of "the highest echelons of southeastern political royalty in Mexico, where they became "a Campeche-based family long active in civil and military affairs."

One of his sons, Joaquín, attained prominence as chief justice of the Supreme Court, a governor of Campeche, and a cabinet minister. His role in establishing institutions like the Public Prosecutor's Office and the Normal School underscored his commitment to advancing Mexican society. Like his father before him, he is buried in the Rotunda of the Illustrious Persons.

Another of Sáinz de Baranda's sons, General Pedro Baranda, etched his name in history as a military officer during the Reform War and the French invasion of Mexico. His leadership in battles aligned with the liberal cause and his instrumental role in founding the federal states of Campeche and Morelos exemplified his dedication to the Nation. He also contributed to the drafting of the 1857 Federal Constitution.

The family's influence extended even further, as Sáinz de Baranda's great-grandson, José María Pino Suárez, emerged as a prominent figure during the Mexican Revolution. As vice-president of Mexico, Pino Suárez played a pivotal role in this transformative period until his tragic assassination in 1913. He too is buried in the Rotunda of the Illustrious Persons.
