= Diódoro =

Diódoro or Diodoro is the Spanish form of Diodorus.

It may also refer to:

- Diódoro Carrasco Altamirano (b. 1954), Mexican politician
- Diódoro Corella (1838–1876), Mexican general

== See also ==
- Deodoro (disambiguation)
- Diodorus (disambiguation)
