= Diodorus (disambiguation) =

Diodorus Siculus was a 1st-century BC Greek historian who wrote the Bibliotheca historica.

Diodorus may also refer to:

- Diodorus of Aspendus, (4th century BC), Pythagorean philosopher
- Diodorus Cronus (died c. 284 BC), Greek philosopher
- Diodorus, son of Xenophon (c. 431 BC – c. 354 BC)
- Diodorus of Tyre (2nd century BC), Peripatetic philosopher
- Diodorus of Adramyttium (1st century BC), rhetorician and Academic philosopher
- Diodorus Pasparus (fl. 69 BC), Pergamene statesman
- Diodorus of Alexandria or Diodorus Alexandrinus (1st century BC), astronomer
- Diodorus of Tarsus (died c. 390), Christian bishop, monastic reformer, and theologian
- Patriarch Diodoros of Jerusalem (1923–2000), Patriarch of Jerusalem in the Eastern Orthodox Church
- Diodorus (genus), a genus of silesaurid dinosauriform

== See also ==
- Deodoro (disambiguation)
- Diódoro (disambiguation)
