= Calixto =

Calixto is a given name. Notable people with the name include:

- Calixto Bieito (born 1963), Spanish theater director known for "radical" interpretations of classic operas
- Calixto Bravo Villaso (1790–1878), Mexican colonel, a cousin of Nicolás Bravo
- Benedito Calixto (1853–1927), Brazilian painter
- Renato Ribeiro Calixto (born 1988), Brazilian footballer
- Calixto R. Catáquiz (born 1948), the incumbent mayor of San Pedro, Laguna, Philippines
- Irineu Calixto Couto (born 1983), Brazilian footballer
- Calixto García (1839–1898), general in three Cuban uprisings, part of the Cuban War for Independence
- Calixto Leicea (1909–2004), Cuban musician
- Calixto Malcom (1947–2021), Panamanian basketball player
- Calixto Ochoa (1934–2015), Colombian musician and songwriter
- Calixto Oyuela (1857–1935), Argentine poet and essayist
- Calixto Pérez (born 1949), retired boxer from Colombia
- Calixto Velado (1855–1927), Salvadoran politician and writer
- Calixto Zaldivar (1904–1979), Member of the House of Representatives of the Philippines

== Fictional Characters ==
=== Surname ===
- Andrés Calixto, a character from Violetta.

== See also ==
- Calixto, Cuba, a town in Las Tunas Province, Cuba
- Calixto García, Cuba, a municipality in Holguín Province, Cuba
- Calixto García Íñiguez Stadium, multi-use stadium in Holguín, Cuba
- San Calixto, Colombian municipality located in the department of North Santander
- Callisto, Ancient Greek mythology, nymph daughter of King Lycaon
- Callisto, Astronomy. Third moon of Jupiter.

Media related to Calixto (given name) at Wikimedia Commons
