= Marechal Deodoro (disambiguation) =

Marechal Deodoro is Marshal Deodoro da Fonseca (1827–1892), the first President of Brazil.

Marechal Deodoro may also refer to:

- Marechal Deodoro, Alagoas, a town in Brazil named after Deodoro da Fonseca
- Marechal Deodoro (São Paulo Metro), a train station

== See also ==
- Deodoro (disambiguation)
