= Deodoro (disambiguation) =

Deodoro most commonly refers to:

- Deodoro da Fonseca (1827–1892), President of Brazil

It may also refer to:

- Deodoro (Rio de Janeiro), a neighborhood of Rio de Janeiro (Brazil), and facilities within the neighbourhood:
  - Deodoro Stadium
  - Deodoro Aquatics Centre
  - Deodoro Olympic Whitewater Stadium
  - Deodoro station
- Deodoro-class coastal defense ship
  - Brazilian coastal defense ship Deodoro

== Other people ==
- Deodoro (footballer), Deodoro José de Almeida Leite (born 1949), Brazilian former footballer

== See also ==
- Diódoro (disambiguation)
- Diodorus (disambiguation)
- Marechal Deodoro (disambiguation)
