= Carlos Ramírez Ulloa =

Mexican civil engineer (1903–1980)

Carlos Ramírez
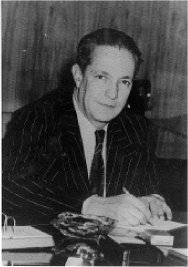
- Carlos Ramirez in his Office
- Born: November 6, 1903; Guadalajara, Mexico
- Died: December 22, 1980 (aged 77)
- Resting place: Panteón de Dolores §§ Rotonda de las Personas Ilustres and Rotunda of Illustrious Persons (1981)
- Education: Universidad Nacional Autónoma de México.
- Known for: Founder and creator of the Comision Federal de Electricidad
- Awards: Lazaro Cardenas Medal (1977), Premio Nacional de Ingeniería (1978), Academico de Honor of La Academia Mexicana de Ingeniería (1979); Homenaje Postumo Colegio de Ingenerios y Arquitectos de México (1981)
- Scientific career
- Fields: Engineering
- Workplaces: Comision Federal de Electricidad of Mexico

Carlos Ramírez Ulloa (November 6, 1903 – December 22, 1980) was a Mexican civil engineer.

Ramírez was born in Guadalajara, Jalisco. At the age of 21 he completed his degree as a civil engineer at the Universidad Nacional Autónoma de México.

He became part of the team that initiated the Comisión Nacional de Irrigación (1926–1928 and 1929–1934) and of the Dirección de Obras Hidraulicas de la Secretaría de Comunicaciones y Obras Públicas (1934–1936) which coordinated works for the protection of Mexico City against flooding.

On December 18, 1937, he married Esther Otero Gonzalez, and they had six sons together: Jorge, Carlos, Sergio, Javier, Mario, and Oscar Ramirez Otero.

In 1937 the president Lazaro Cardenas asked him to create and organize the Comision Federal de Electricidad (CFE); in 1952 to 1959 he became the first director of the Comisión Federal de Electricidad. In this 16 years of work he completed or started the construction of 37 hydroelectric dams, 13 thermoelectric plants and one geothermic power plant. These projects consolidated the provisioning of energy to power all of Mexico, allowing economic growth through improvement in irrigation, industrial and residential systems.

He led the nationalization of the electrical companies of Chapala, Morelia, Uruapan, Tlaxcala, Moncolva, Occidental, and others, serving on their boards of directors.

In 1946 he became founder member of the Colegio de Ingenieros Civiles de Mexico.

Ramírez was the first general manager of Industria Electrica de Mexico (IEM), manufacturing company of products for the power generation and electrical markets. From 1948 to 1952 he became the technical director of the Constructora el Aguila, S.A., participating in several important construction projects. These included the Miguel Alemán Dam on the Tonto River, upstream from Temascal, Oaxaca. It has a capacity of 8 million cubic metres (10 million cubic yards), or 2,100 million US gallons (8 million kilolitres).

From 1959 to 1980 he participated in several companies including Proyectos INTUAL, focusing on projects for drinking water, irrigation, hydrolectric power, geohydrology, pollution control, and economic planning.

In 1965 Carlos became the president founder of the Asociación Mexicana de Hidráulica.

In 1977 he received the first Lazaro Cardenas Medal from the president Lopez Portillo, and in 1978 he received the Premio Nacional de Ingeniería.

After his death in December 1980, the Colegio de Ingenieros Civiles de Mexico, gave a tribute to their late member on February 11, 1981. During the tribute, a request was made to honour Ramírez by having his remains reinterred at the Rotunda of Illustrious Persons. The president approved the arrangement on July 12; the remains were moved there on August 14, 2011.

Two institutions bear his name in recognition to his life achievements:

- The dam known as El Caracol "Ing. Carlos Ramírez Ulloa"
- Escuela Secundaria Tecnica No. 39 "Ing. Carlos Ramírez Ulloa" since 1983
