= Calixto Bravo Villaso =

Mexican colonel

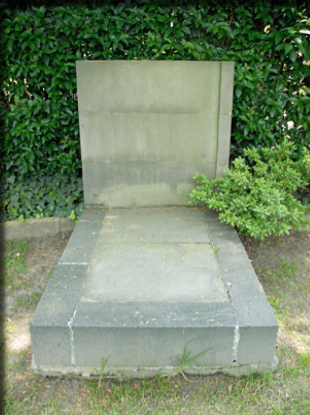

Calixto Bravo Villaso (1790 in Chilpancingo, Guerrero – April 5, 1878 in Mexico City) was a Mexican colonel, he was a cousin of Nicolás Bravo. Bravo served in the Mexican Army during the Mexican War of Independence with José María Morelos. In 1821, he was fighting in the state of Veracruz and in 1846, in the Mexican–American War. He heroically defended the city of Laredo against the United States Army (led by Zachary Taylor), with a small company of only 48 men...

He died in 1878 as the last survivor from the Mexican War of Independence. His remains were interred on April 7, 1878 at the Rotunda of Illustrious Persons.
