= Panteón de Dolores =

Cemetery in Mexico City, Mexico

Coordinates: 19.407°N 99.204°W

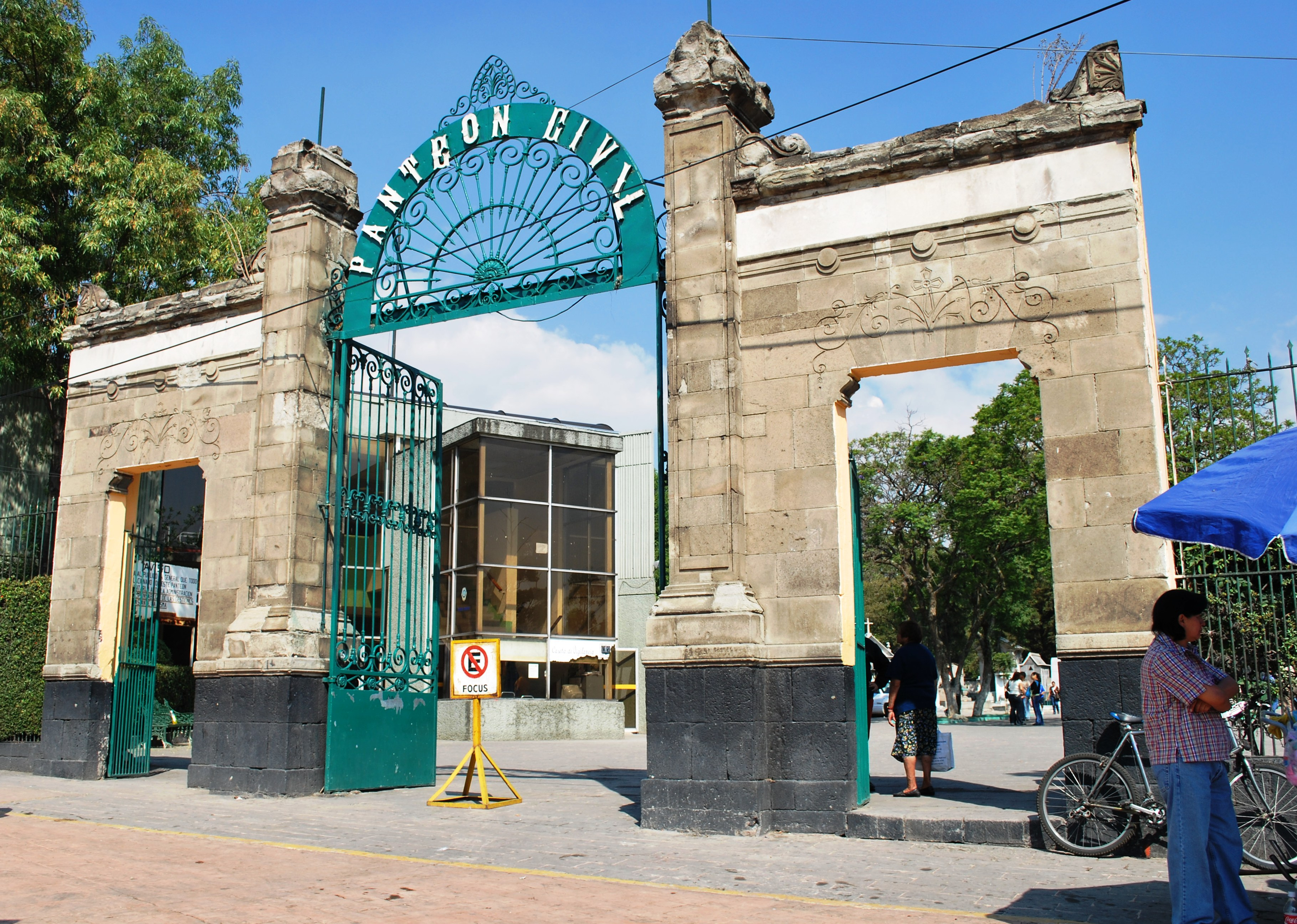
- Main entrance to the Panteón de Dolores
- Interactive map of Panteón de Dolores

Details
- Established: 1875
- Location: Miguel Hidalgo borough, Mexico City
- Country: Mexico
- Type: Closed (1975)
- Size: 240 square hectometres (590 acres)
- No. of graves: 700,000
- No. of interments: over 1 million

The Panteón Civil de Dolores is the largest cemetery in Mexico and contains the Rotonda de las Personas Ilustres (English: Rotunda of Illustrious Persons). It is located on Avenida Constituyentes in the Miguel Hidalgo borough of Mexico City, between sections two and three of Chapultepec Park.

== History ==
The history of the cemetery goes back to 1870, when Juan Manuel Benfield—owner of El Rancho de Coscoacoaco (his wife was Concepción Gayosso y Mugarrieta, sister of Eusebio Gayosso)—set aside an area of his ranch measuring 240 square hectometres (590 acres), called La Tabla de Dolores, on which he intended to establish a cemetery. In 1875, the cemetery was opened and named El Panteón Civil de Dolores. Juan Manuel Benfield founded the cemetery in honor of his sister, who died in Veracruz shortly after she had arrived from London, England with their parents. As they were Anglicans, and all cemeteries in Veracruz were consecrated for use only by Roman Catholics, the only suitable burial ground to be had was on the beach. Today, the cemetery has about 700,000 tombs, many with multiple occupants.

== The Rotunda of Illustrious Persons ==
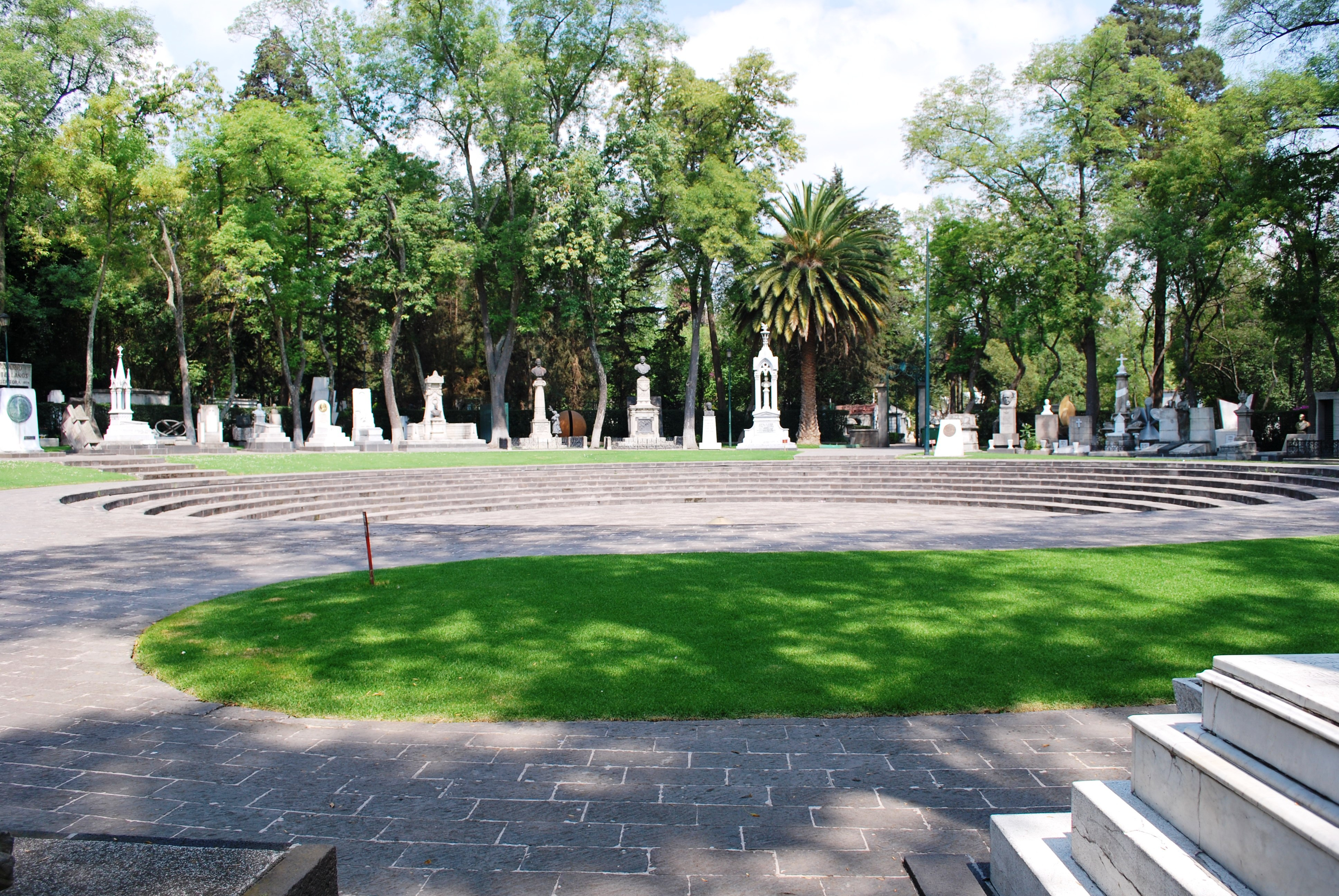
View of the Rotunda

The Rotonda de las Personas Ilustres (Rotunda of Illustrious Persons) is a site that honors those who are considered to have exalted the civic, national and human values of Mexico. It contains the graves of those who have made important contributions in the military, civic and cultural fields. Originally named "The Rotunda of Illustrious Men" (Rotonda de los Hombres Ilustres), it was conceived by then President Sebastián Lerdo de Tejada as a space to perpetuate the memory of chosen men. The decree reads, "In this place of honor, the necessary land will be given free of charge to erect the monuments designed to guard the remains of or perpetuate the memory of the illustrious men who are decreed or for whom posthumous honors are decreed."

In 1876, the first person to be honored with a burial there was a soldier by the name of Pedro Litechipia, who died fighting against the empire of Maximilian. By decree of President Vicente Fox, in 2003, the name was changed to "Rotonda de las Personas Ilustres" ("Rotunda of Distinguished Persons", rather than 'men') as the Rotunda has a number of female occupants. The Rotunda contains the graves of three former presidents, many heroes from the Mexican Revolution, writers, artists and scientists. The National General Archive shows 104 images of those buried there.

== Problems ==
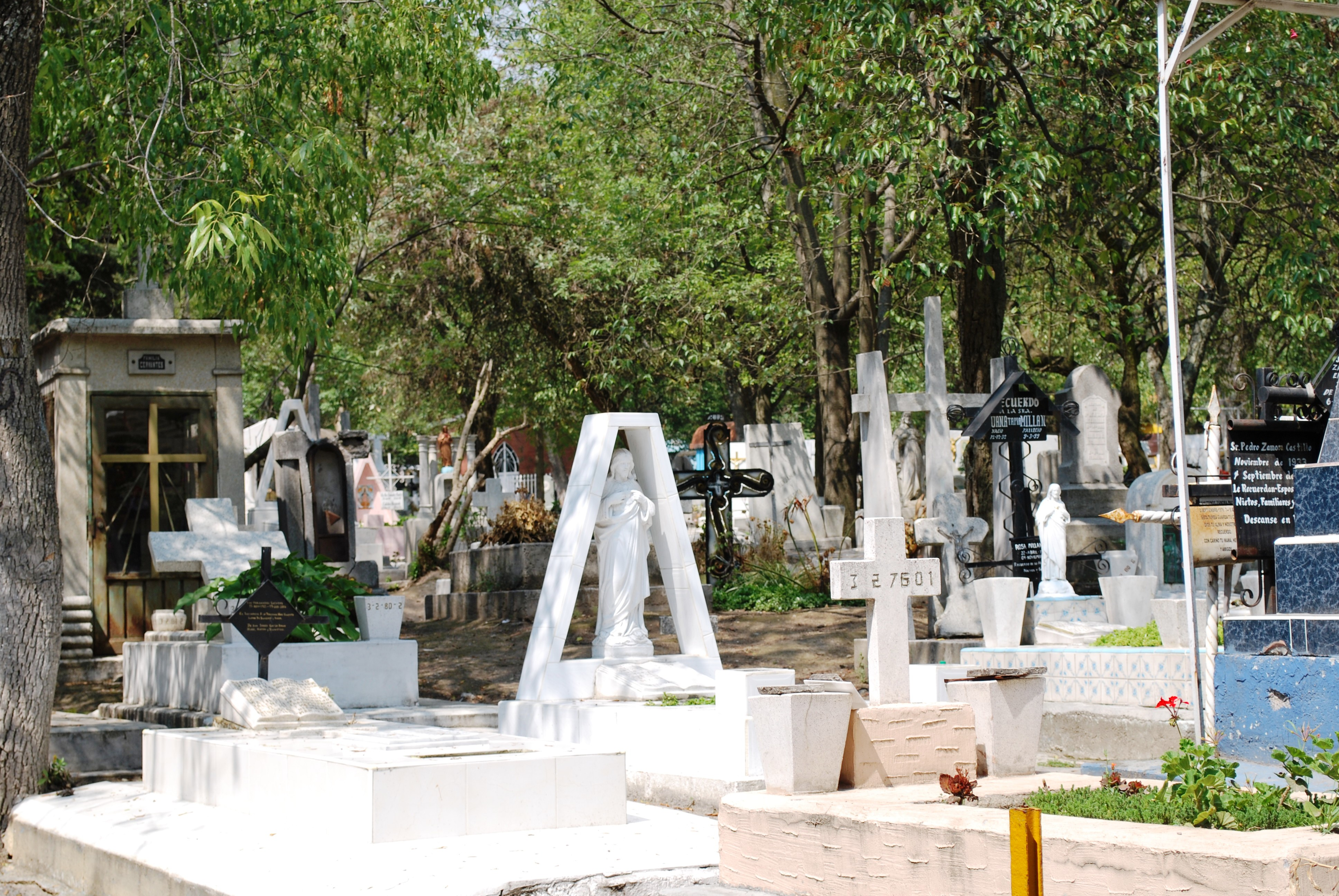
Crowded gravesites

Generally considered the largest cemetery in Latin America, the most serious problem at the cemetery is limited space. No new grave sites have been established since 1975, and only those individuals who have purchased a site in-perpetuity, prior to 1977, can bury relatives in the cemetery; however, the remains must be stacked above those who are already interred. Municipal laws permit a maximum of five bodies to be buried in the same plot, yet some tombs may have as many as ten buried on top of each other.

The cemetery is working to encourage the acceptance and practice of cremation as an acceptable alternative. The crowded cemetery, along with the desires of many to be interred there, has created a higher demand for exhumations as well as cremation services. The cemetery has four crematoria, averaging about four cremations daily. However, an average of ten traditional burials are still performed each day, all in graves that have been used previously.

The cemetery is listed with National Institute of Anthropology and History as an historical monument, due to the many iconic persons interred there and the old age of the property. However, this status has not kept the cemetery in good repair. There are problems with maintenance as well as security. In the back part of the cemetery, in a gully, workers have discarded old caskets and urns that are considered unusable. Those who work in the cemetery bear witness or can attest to graverobbing for artistic and archaeologically-significant pieces.

In January 2009, a section of the original south-side retaining wall that was built in the 19th century crumbled and fell, damaging a number of graves in the process. This section was over 1 km long and 4 meters high. Rehabilitation work had been scheduled for September 2008, at a cost of 10 million pesos, with a focus of making the cemetery more dignified for visitors, including the remodeling of the main entrance on Constituyentes Avenue.

== Notable people interred at the Panteón Dolores ==
The following is the list of people currently interred at the Rotunda of Illustrious Persons:

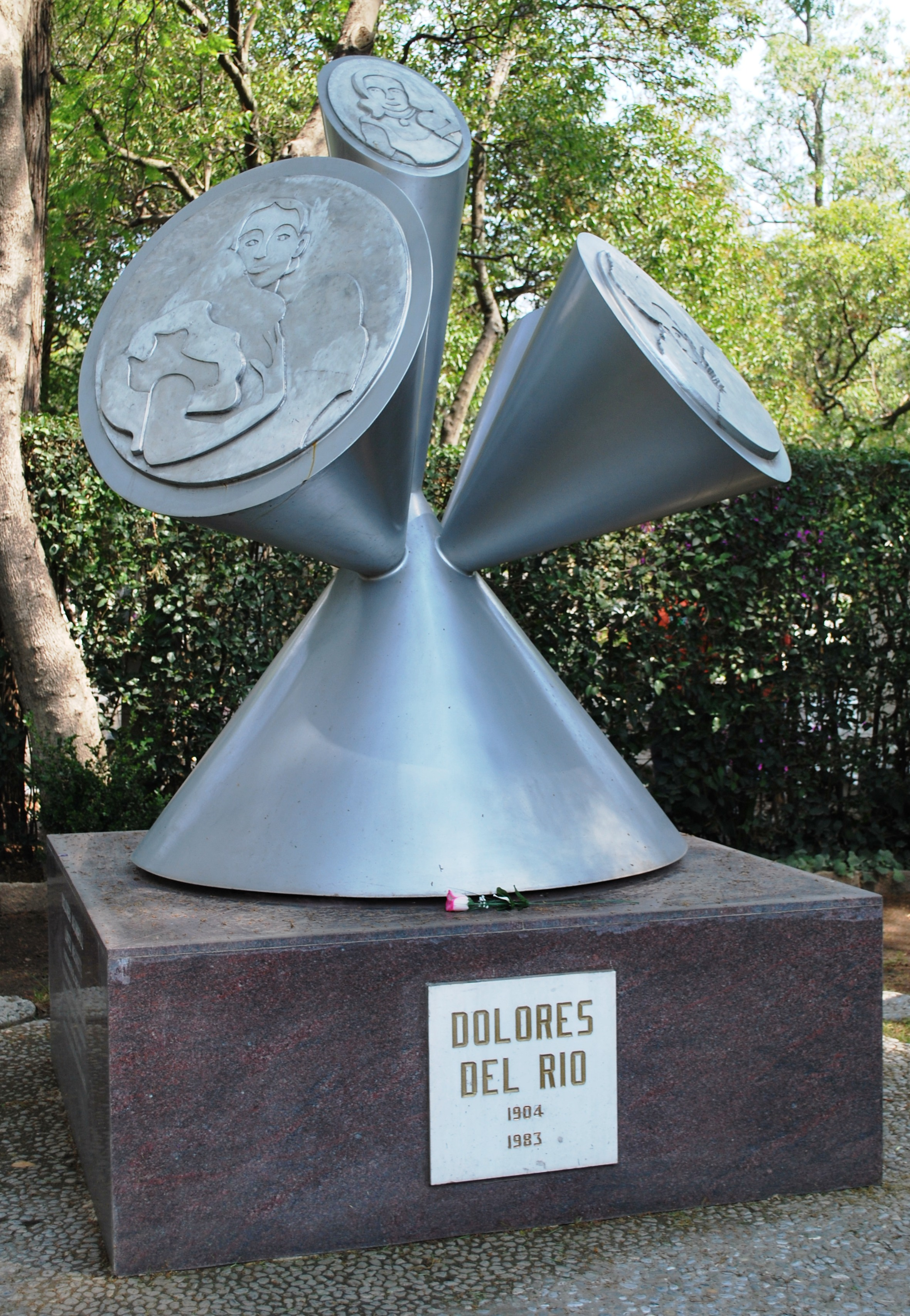
Grave of Dolores Del Rio

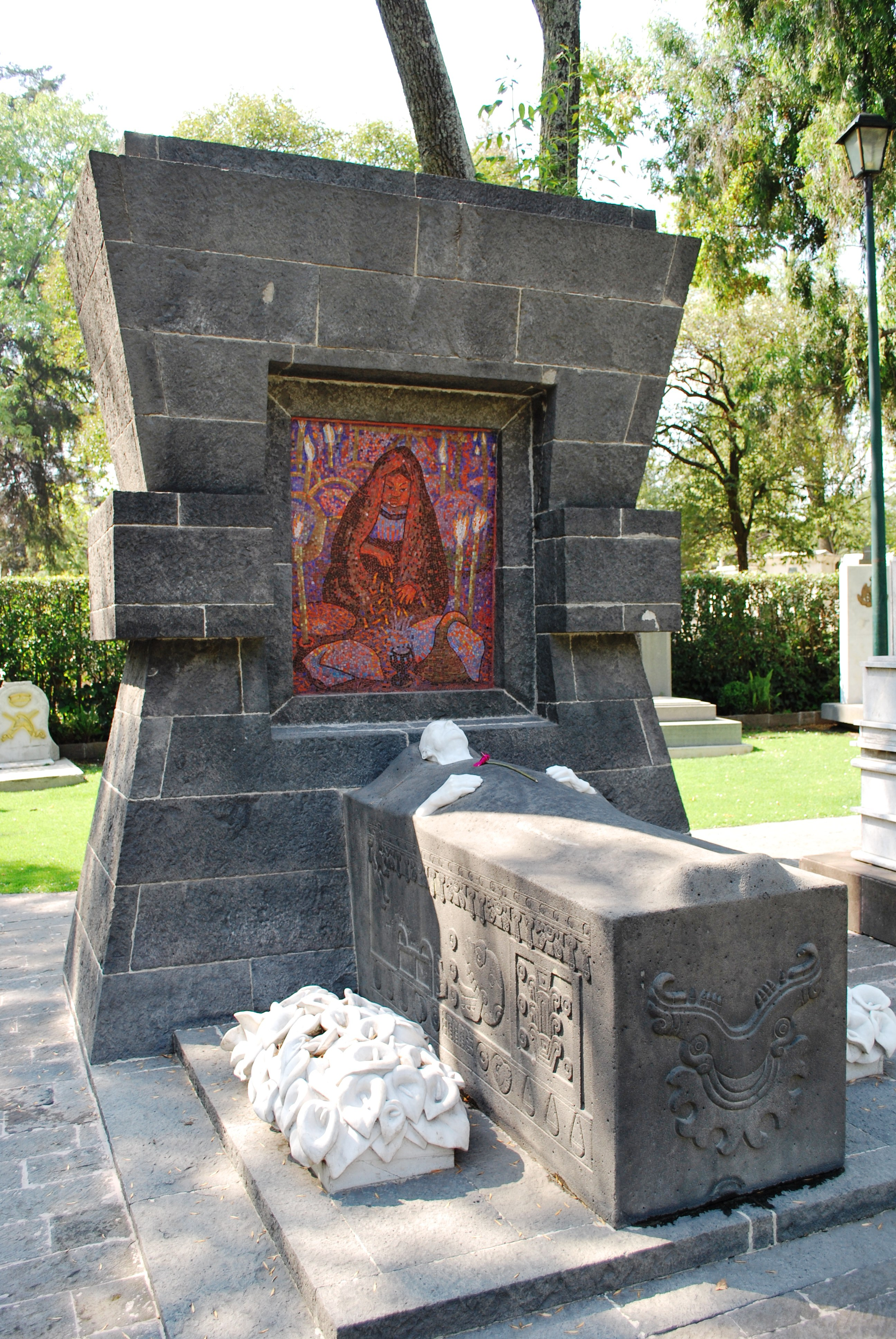
Grave of Diego Rivera

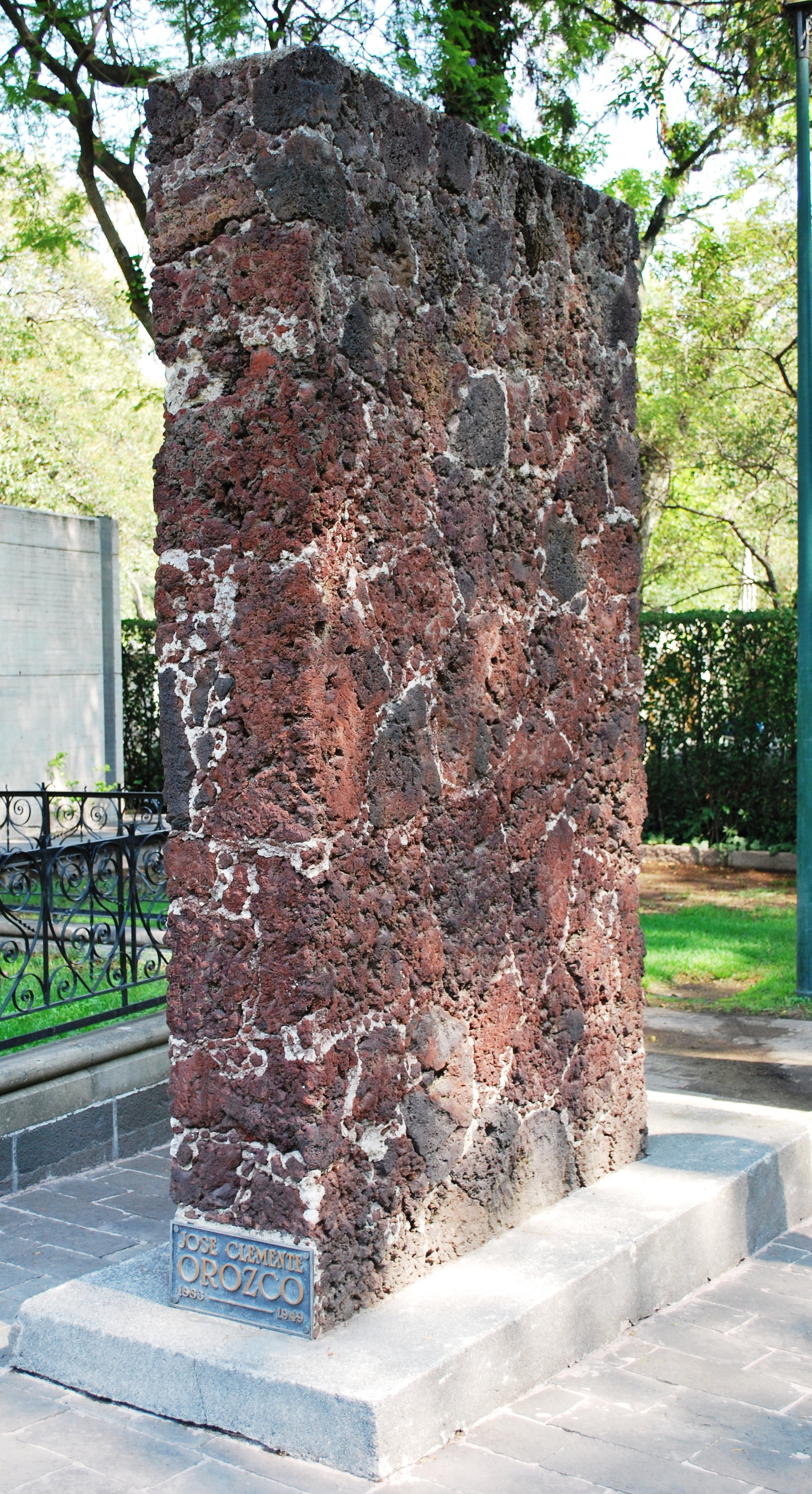
Grave of José Clemente Orozco

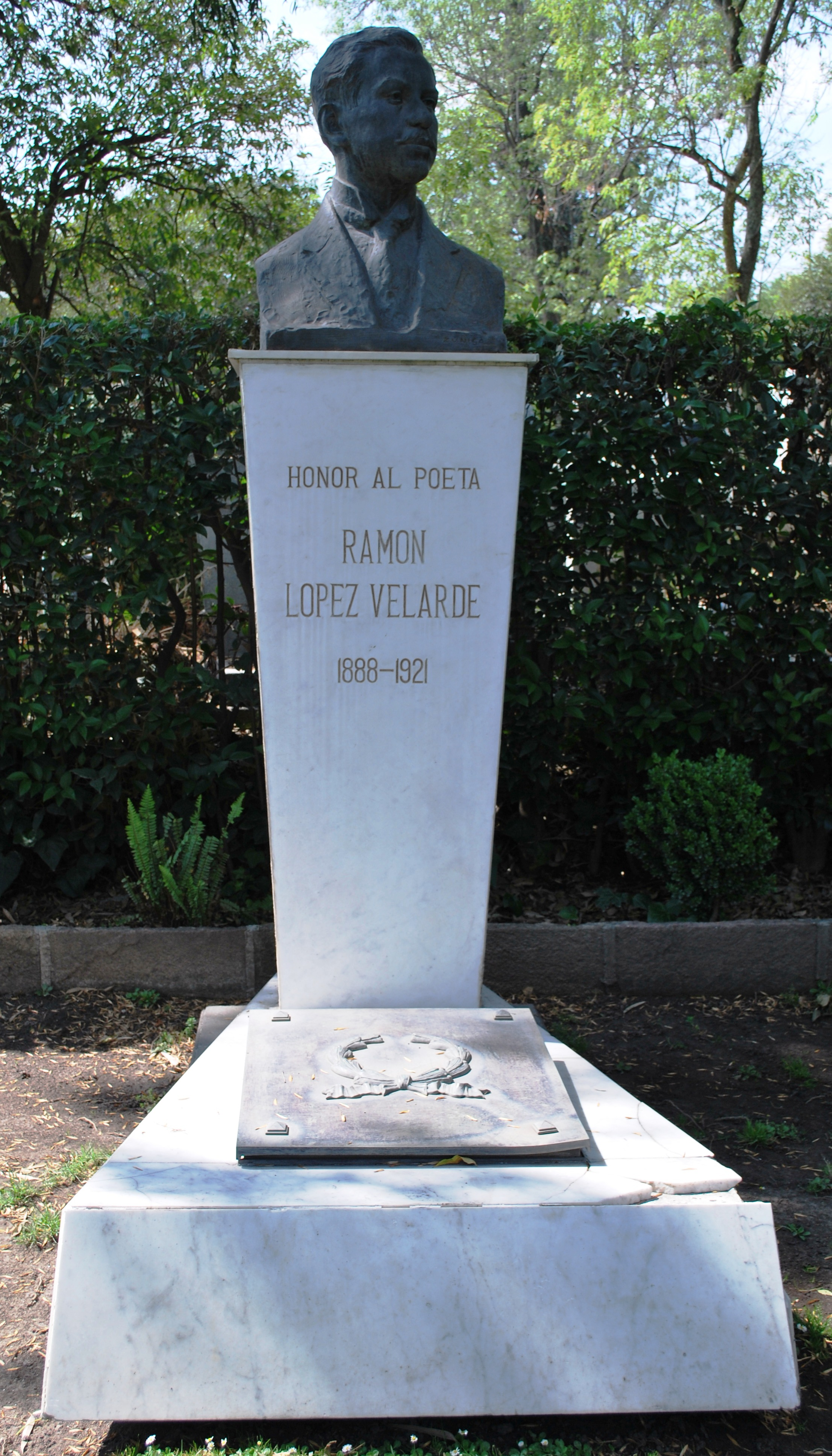
Grave of Ramón López Velarde

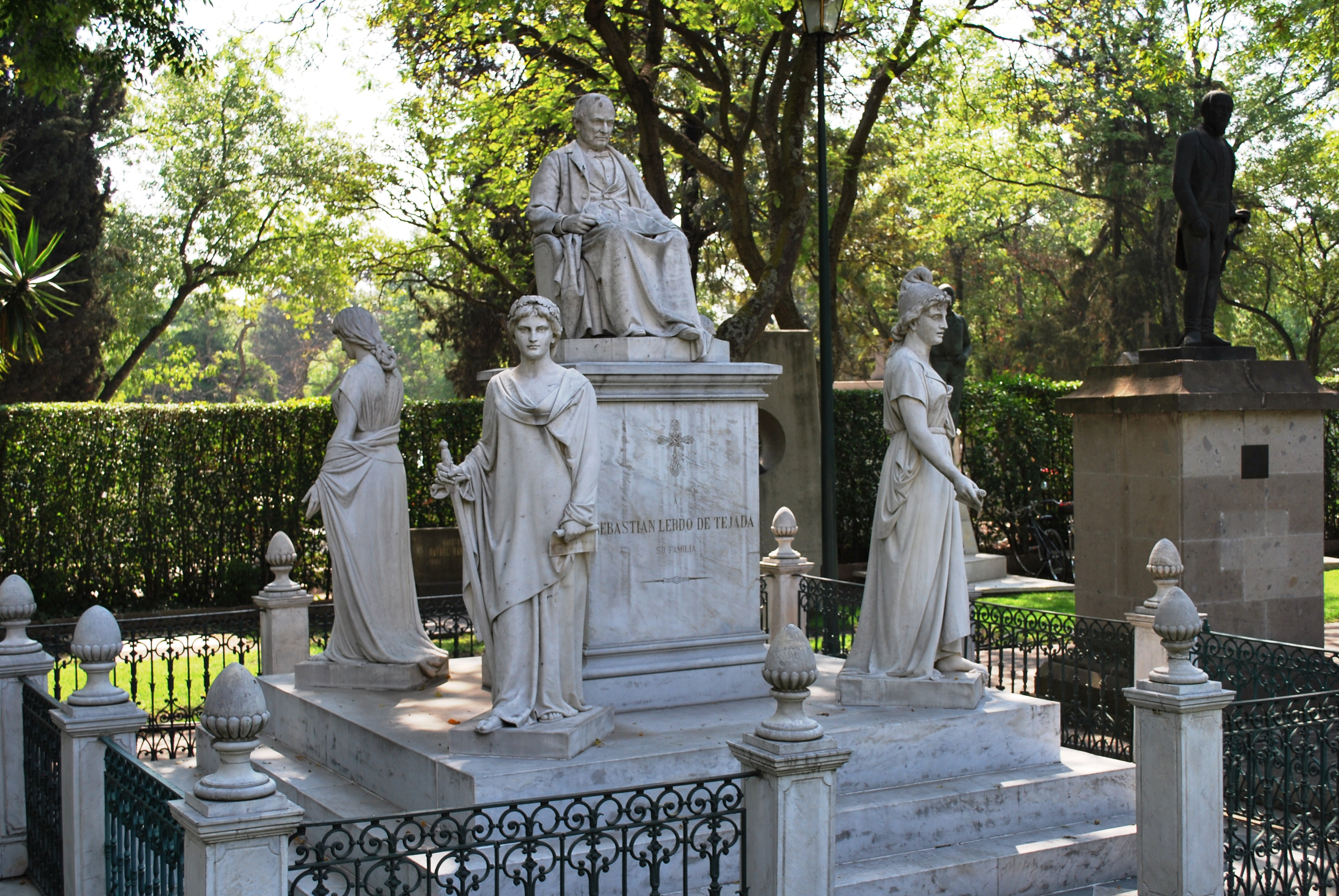
Grave of Sebastián Lerdo de Tejada

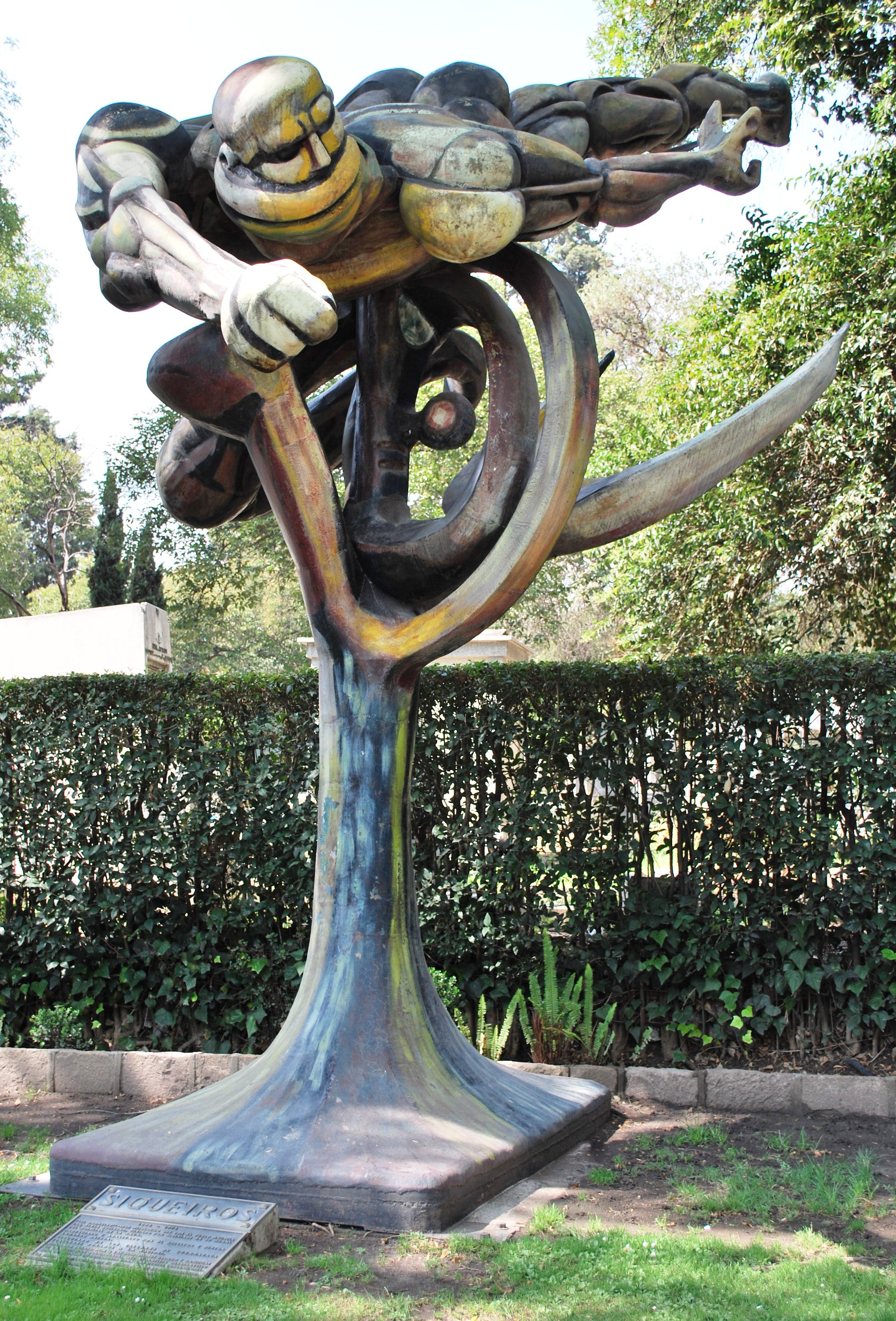
Grave of David Alfaro Siqueiros

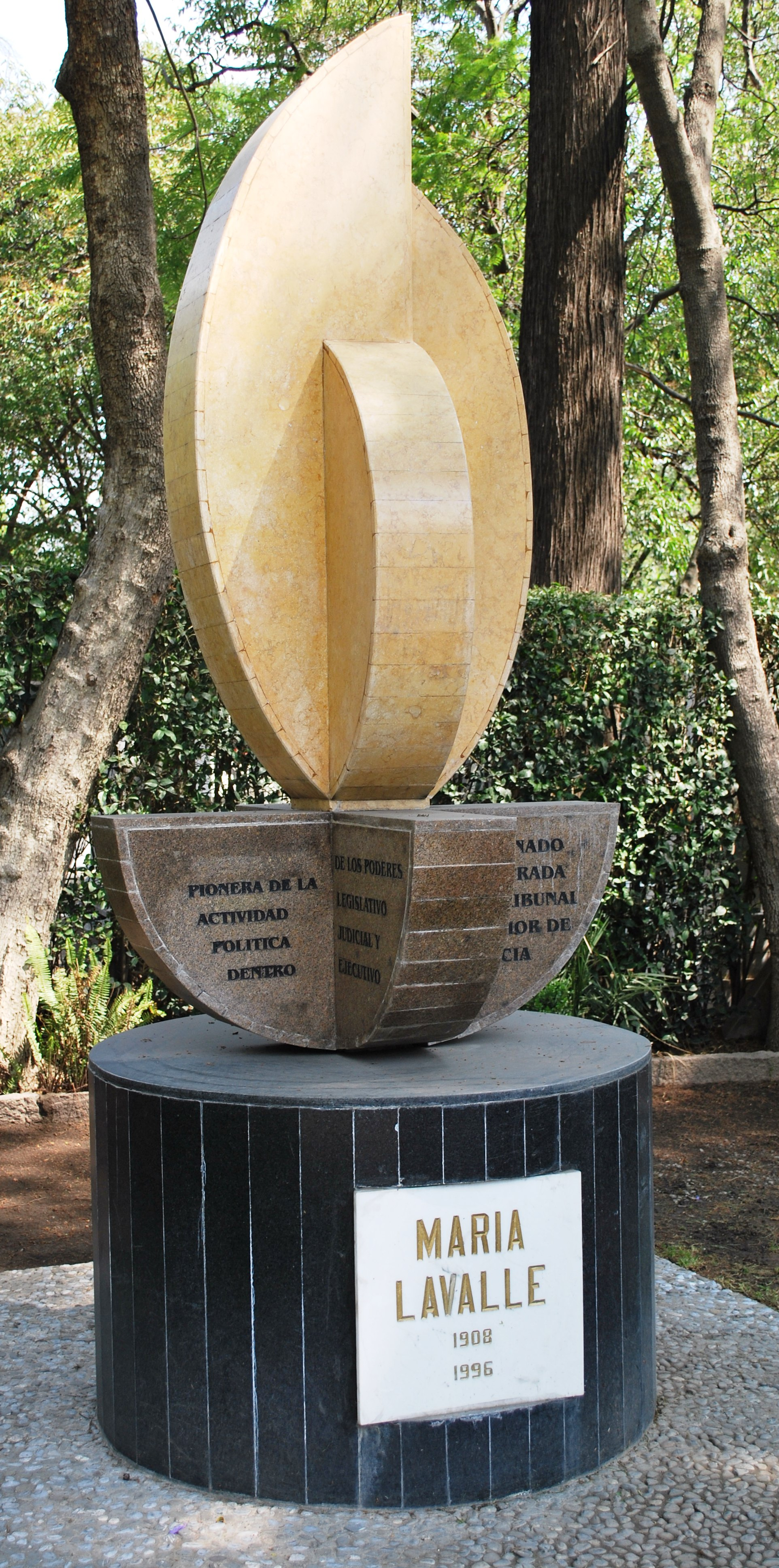
Grave of María Lavalle

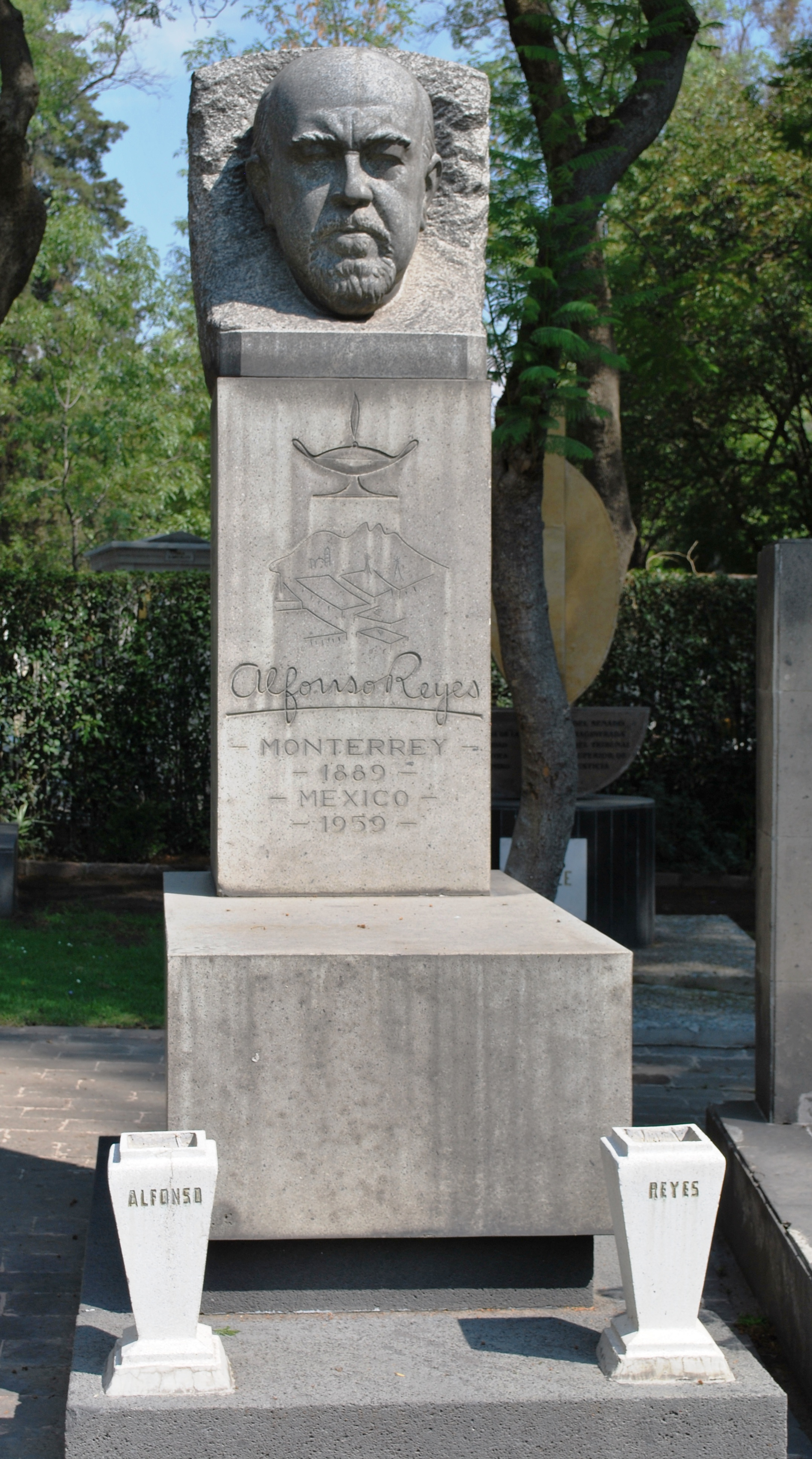
Grave of Alfonso Reyes

Name	Occupation	Birthplace	Year of birth & death	Date interred
David Alfaro Siqueiros	muralist	Chihuahua	1896–1974	Jan 8, 1974
Ignacio Manuel Altamirano	lawyer, novelist, diplomat	Guerrero	1834–1893	Nov 14, 1934
Tina Modotti	photographer, activist	Friuli, Italy	1896–1942	
Juan Álvarez	interim president	Guerrero	1790–1867	Dec 27, 1922
Eligio Ancona del Castillo	author, playwright, governor	Yucatán	1835–1893	Apr 13, 1903
Agustín Aragón León	educator, deputy	Morelos	1870–1954	Mar 31, 1954
Mariano Arista Nuez	president, military leader	San Luis Potosí	1802–1855	Oct 8, 1881
Ponciano Arriaga	governor, lawyer	San Luis Potosí	1811–1863	Jun 22, 1900
Manuel Azpiroz	military leader, diplomat	Puebla	1836–1905	Apr 24, 1905
Mariano Azuela	author, physician	Jalisco	1873–1952	Mar 2, 1952
Joaquín Baranda	jurist, deputy	Yucatán	1840–1909	Jun 29, 1981
Gabino Barreda	educator	Puebla	1818–1881	Jan 22, 1968
Felipe Berriozábal	military leader, governor	Zacatecas	1829–1900	Jan 12, 1900
Calixto Bravo Villaso	military leader	Guerrero	1790–1878	Apr 7, 1878
Fidelia Brindis Camacho	journalist, teacher and activist	Ocozocoautla de Espinosa	1889–1972	1972
Valentín Campa	railway union leader and presidential candidate	Monterrey	1904–1999	Nov 25, 2019
Emilio Carranza Rodríguez	aviator	Coahuila	1905–1928	Jul 24, 1928
Nabor Carrillo Flores	scientist	Mexico City	1911–1967	Jan 28, 1975
Julián Carrillo	musician, composer	San Luis Potosí	1875–1965	Jan 28, 1975
Alfonso Caso	archaeologist, anthropologist	Mexico City	1896–1970	Jan 7, 1974
Antonio Caso	author, philosopher	Mexico City	1883–1946	Dec 19, 1963
Rosario Castellanos	author, teacher, diplomat	Mexico City	1925–1974	Aug 9, 1974
Heberto Castillo	social leader, engineer, politician	Veracruz	1928–1997	Apr 5, 2004
José Cevallos Cepeda	military leader, governor	Durango	1831–1893	Apr 22, 1893
Francisco Javier Clavijero	historian, teacher	Veracruz	1731–1787	Aug 6, 1970
Diódoro Corella	military leader	Sonora	1838–1876	Jun 17, 1876
Carlos Chávez	musician, composer	Mexico City	1899–1978	Aug 3, 1978
Ignacio Chávez	physician, scientist	Michoacán	1897–1979	Feb 26, 1997
Santos Degollado	military leader, politician	Guanajuato	1811–1861	Nov 26, 1936
Francisco Díaz Covarrubias	engineer, scientist, diplomat	Veracruz	1833–1889	Oct 29, 1921
Salvador Díaz Mirón	poet, politician, journalist	Veracruz	1853–1928	Jun 16, 1928
Mariano Escobedo	military leader, politician	Nuevo León	1826–1902	May 24, 1902
Genaro Estrada	historian, politician	Sinaloa	1887–1937	Oct 3, 1977
Virginia Fábregas	stage actress	Morelos	1872–1950	Nov 18, 1950
Ricardo Flores Magón	journalist, anarchist	Oaxaca	1874–1922	May 1, 1945
Juan José de la Garza	governor, jurist, military leader	Tamaulipas	1826–1893	Oct 18, 1893
Emma Godoy	author	Guanajuato	1918–1989	Nov 28, 2006
Valentín Gómez Farías	deputy, physician, president	Jalisco	1781–1858	Jul 3, 1933
Manuel Gómez Morín	ideologist	Chihuahua	1897–1972	Feb 27, 2004
Manuel González Flores	president, military leader	Tamaulipas	1833–1893	May 11, 1893
Francisco González Bocanegra	poet, author	San Luis Potosí	1824–1861	Sep 27, 1932
Amalia Gonzalez Caballero	diplomat, cabinet minister, minister plenipotentiary and writer	Tamaulipas	1898–1986	Nov 22, 2012
Enrique González Martínez	author, diplomat	Jalisco	1871–1952	Feb 20, 1952
Jesús González Ortega	military leader, governor	Zacatecas	1822–1881	Apr 1, 1881
Donato Guerra	military leader	Jalisco	1832–1876	May 27, 1896
Guillermo Haro	astronomer	Mexico City	1913–1988	Aug 6, 1994
José María Iglesias	president, jurist	Mexico City	1823–1891	Jan 29, 1987
María Izquierdo	painter	Jalisco	1902–1955	Nov 22, 2012
Agustín Lara	musician, composer	Veracruz	1900–1970	Nov 9, 1970
María Lavalle Urbina	magistrate, senator, rights activist	Campeche	1908–1996	Nov 28, 2006
Sebastián Lerdo de Tejada	president, lawyer, politician	Veracruz	1823–1889	May 14, 1889
Pedro Letechipía	military leader	Zacatecas	1832–1876	Mar 21, 1876
Vicente Lombardo Toledano	politician, ideologist	Puebla	1894–1968	Jul 16, 1994
Ramón López Velarde	poet	Zacatecas	1888–1921	Jun 15, 1963
Francisco Martínez de la Vega	journalist, governor	San Luis Potosí	1909–1985	Aug 6, 1994
José María Mata	military leader, diplomat	Veracruz	1819–1895	Mar 16, 1900
Juan A. Mateos	author, politician	Mexico City	1831–1813	Dic 30, 1913
Ignacio Mejía	military leader, politician	Oaxaca	1814–1906	Jun 27, 1914
Juan N. Méndez	president, military leader	Puebla	1820–1894	Dec 3, 1894
Jose Pablo Moncayo	pianist, percussionist, music teacher, composer and conductor	Jalisco	1912–1958	Nov 22, 2012
Francisco Montes de Oca	military physician	Mexico City	1837–1885	May 18, 1885
José María Luis Mora	politician, historian	Guanajuato	1794–1850	Jun 24, 1963
Gerardo Murillo, "Dr. Atl"	muralist	Jalisco	1875–1964	Aug 16, 1964
Miguel Negrete	military leader, minister	Puebla	1824–1897	May 5, 1948
Amado Nervo	poet, journalist, diplomat	Nayarit	1870–1919	Nov 14, 1919
Jaime Nunó	musician, composer	Catalonia, Spain	1824–1908	Oct 11, 1942
Edmundo O'Gorman	writer, historian and philosopher	Mexico City	1906–1995	Nov 22, 2012
Juan O'Gorman	muralist, architect	Mexico City	1905–1982	Nov 11, 1982
Melchor Ocampo	politician, lawyer	Michoacán	1814–1861	Jun 3, 1897
Isaac Ochotorena	biologist, educator	Puebla	1885–1950	Apr 12, 1950
Pedro Ogazón Rubio	governor, politician	Jalisco	1824–1890	May 3, 1890
José Clemente Orozco	muralist	Jalisco	1883–1949	Sep 8, 1949
Manuel José Othón	poet, playwright, deputy	San Luis Potosí	1858–1906	Jun 14, 1964
Carlos Pacheco	military leader, politician	Chihuahua	1839–1891	Sep 19, 1891
Carlos Pellicer	poet, curator	Tabasco	1899–1977	Mar 31, 1977
Manuel de la Peña y Peña	president, jurist	Mexico City	1789–1850	Jan 2, 1895
Ángela Peralta	opera singer, composer	Mexico City	1845–1883	Apr 17, 1937
Basilio Pérez Gallardo	politician, author	Zacatecas	1817–1889	Feb 6, 1889
José María Pino Suárez	vice president, author, politician	Tabasco	1869–1913	Nov 6, 1986
Manuel M. Ponce	musician, composer	Zacatecas	1886–1948	Oct 4, 1952
Guillermo Prieto	politician, author	Mexico City	1818–1897	Mar 4, 1897
Bernardo Quintana	engineer	Mexico City	1919–1984	Oct 20, 2005
Ignacio Ramírez, "El Nigromante"	politician, journalist, author	Guanajuato	1818–1879	Oct 7, 1934
Rafael Ramírez Castañeda	educator	Veracruz	1885–1959	Mar 23, 1976
Carlos Ramírez Ulloa	engineer	Jalisco	1903–1980	Aug 14, 1981
Miguel Ramos Arizpe	politician, priest	Coahuila	1775–1843	Jun 29, 1974
Silvestre Revueltas	musician, composer	Durango	1899–1940	Mar 23, 1976
Jesús Reyes Heroles	ideologist, historian, politician	Veracruz	1921–1985	Mar 5, 2003
Alfonso Reyes	author, diplomat	Nuevo León	1889–1959	Dec 28, 1959
Dolores del Río	actress	Durango	1905–1983	Nov 28, 2006
Vicente Riva Palacio	author, historian, politician	Mexico City	1832–1896	May 20, 1936
Diego Rivera	muralist, painter	Guanajuato	1886–1957	Nov 26, 1957
Sóstenes Rocha	military leader	Guanajuato	1831–1897	April 1, 1897
Antonio Rosales	military leader, poet, journalist	Zacatecas	1822–1865	Jan 5, 1923
Juventino Rosas	musician, composer	Guanajuato	1868–1894	Jan 5, 1923
Arturo Rosenblueth	physician, researcher	Chihuahua	1900–1970	Jan 7, 1974
Carlos Rovirosa	aviator	Tabasco	1904–1930	May 24, 1930
Miguel Ruelas	lawyer, diplomat	Zacatecas	1838–1880	Oct 30, 1881
Moisés Sáenz	educator	Nuevo León	1888–1941	Jun 29, 1981
Pedro Sainz de Baranda	military leader	Campeche	1787–1845	Mar 13, 1987
Rosendo Salazar	ideologist, worker	Puebla	1888–1971	Dec 19, 1971
Manuel Sandoval Vallarta	physicist, researcher	Mexico City	1899–1977	Oct 5, 1988
Maj. Basilio San Martin	military leader	Toluca	1849–1905	Oct 9, 1905
Col. Vicente San Martin	military leader	Toluca	1839–1901	Apr 15, 1901
Francisco Sarabia	aviator	Durango	1900–1939	Jun 11, 1939
Pablo Sidar	aviator	Zaragoza, Spain	1895–1930	May 24, 1930
Justo Sierra	historian, politician, poet	Campeche	1848–1912	Nov 5, 1946
Jesús Silva Herzog	economist, sociologist, teacher	San Luis Potosí	1893–1985	Nov 14, 1988
José Juan Tablada	diplomat, author	Mexico City	1871–1945	Nov 5, 1946
Jaime Torres Bodet	poet, diplomat	Mexico City	1902–1974	May 14, 1974
Gregorio Torres Quintero	educator, short story author	Colima	1866–1934	Jun 29, 1981
Luis G. Urbina	poet, journalist	Mexico City	1864–1934	Dec 13, 1934
Francisco L. Urquizo	revolutionary general, historian	Coahuila	1891–1969	Aug 6, 1994
Jesús Urueta	politician, journalist	Chihuahua	1867–1920	Mar 29, 1921
Basilio Vadillo	educator, diplomat, politician	Jalisco	1885–1935	Nov 5, 1935
Ignacio L. Vallarta	governor, jurist, politician	Jalisco	1830–1893	Jan 10, 1894
Leandro Valle	military leader	Mexico City	1833–1861	Jun 18, 1987
Felipe Villanueva	musician, composer	State of Mexico	1862–1893	Aug 27, 1945
Agustín Yáñez	governor, author, politician	Jalisco	1904–1980	Jan 18, 1980

== See also ==
- Cemeteries in Mexico
- Parks in Mexico City
- Rotonda de Hombres Ilustres — similar style monument in city of Chihuahua, México.
