= Joaquín Baranda =

Mexican politician

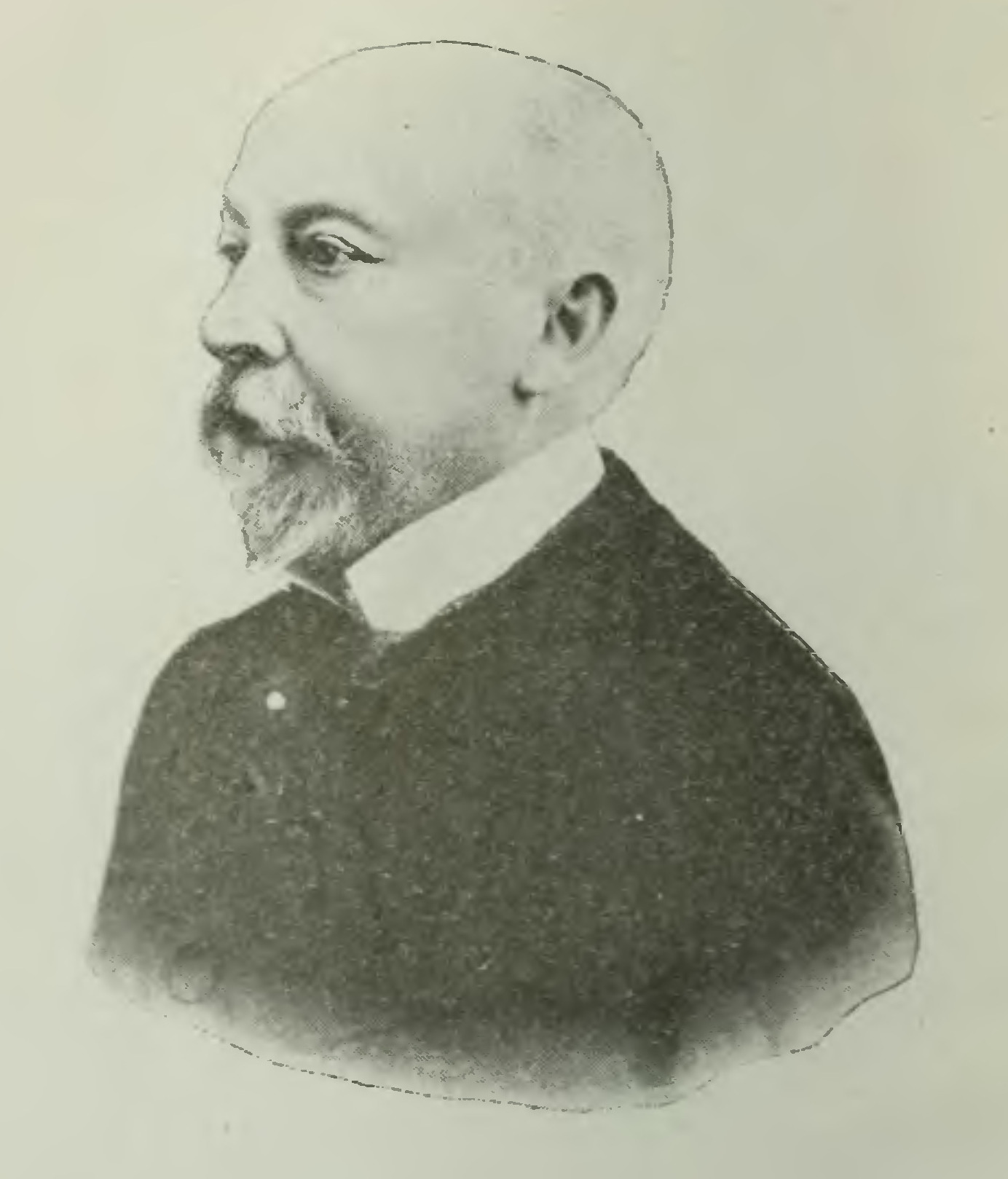
Joaquín Baranda Portrait

Joaquín Baranda (May 7, 1840, Mérida, Yucatán – May 21, 1909, Mexico City) was a Mexican politician, lawyer and jurist. He played a main role in the creation of institutions like the Ministry of Justice (Spanish: Procuraduría General de la República) and the Escuela Normal para Profesores. During his political career he served in the Chamber of Deputies and as president of the Supreme Tribunal of Justice, also as governor of Campeche from 1871 to 1877. His remains were interred on June 29, 1981 at the Rotunda of Illustrious Persons.
