= Diódoro Corella =

Mexican military leader (1838–1876)

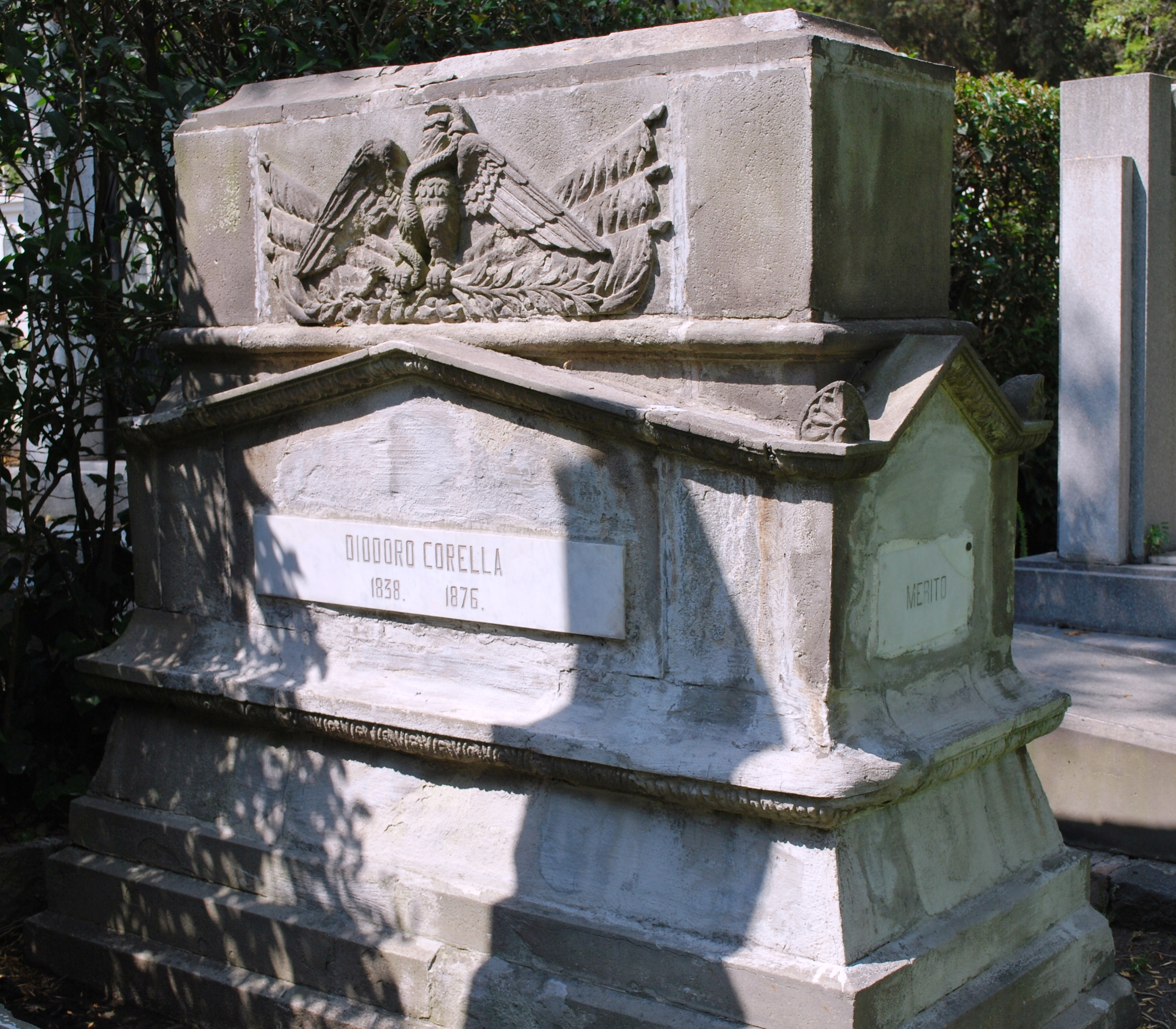

Diódoro Corella (1838 inArizpe, Sonora – 15 June 1876, in Mexico City) was a Mexican general and the Governor of San Luis Potosí from 1872 to 1873. Corella was a liberal and strongly opposed French Intervention in Mexico, being exiled by the conservative government. He returned to Mexico upon the victory of Benito Juárez and fought against Porfirio Díaz when he tried to seize power. In 1871, he fought against the Uprising of Tamaulipas, and in 1872, he headed a cavalry division with the rank of colonel general and then brigade general; that year he fought Jerónimo Treviño's forces in the Battle of Monterrey with, according to Juan E. Guerra, 4,000 men. In early 1876, he was in Santo Domingo Yanhuitlán suppressing the Revolution of Tuxtepec, a second uprising by Díaz, and on 2 June, he was reported as wounded from battle. His remains were interred on 17 July 1876 at the Rotunda of Illustrious Persons.

== See also ==
- La Reforma
- Reform War
