= Diodorus Pasparus =

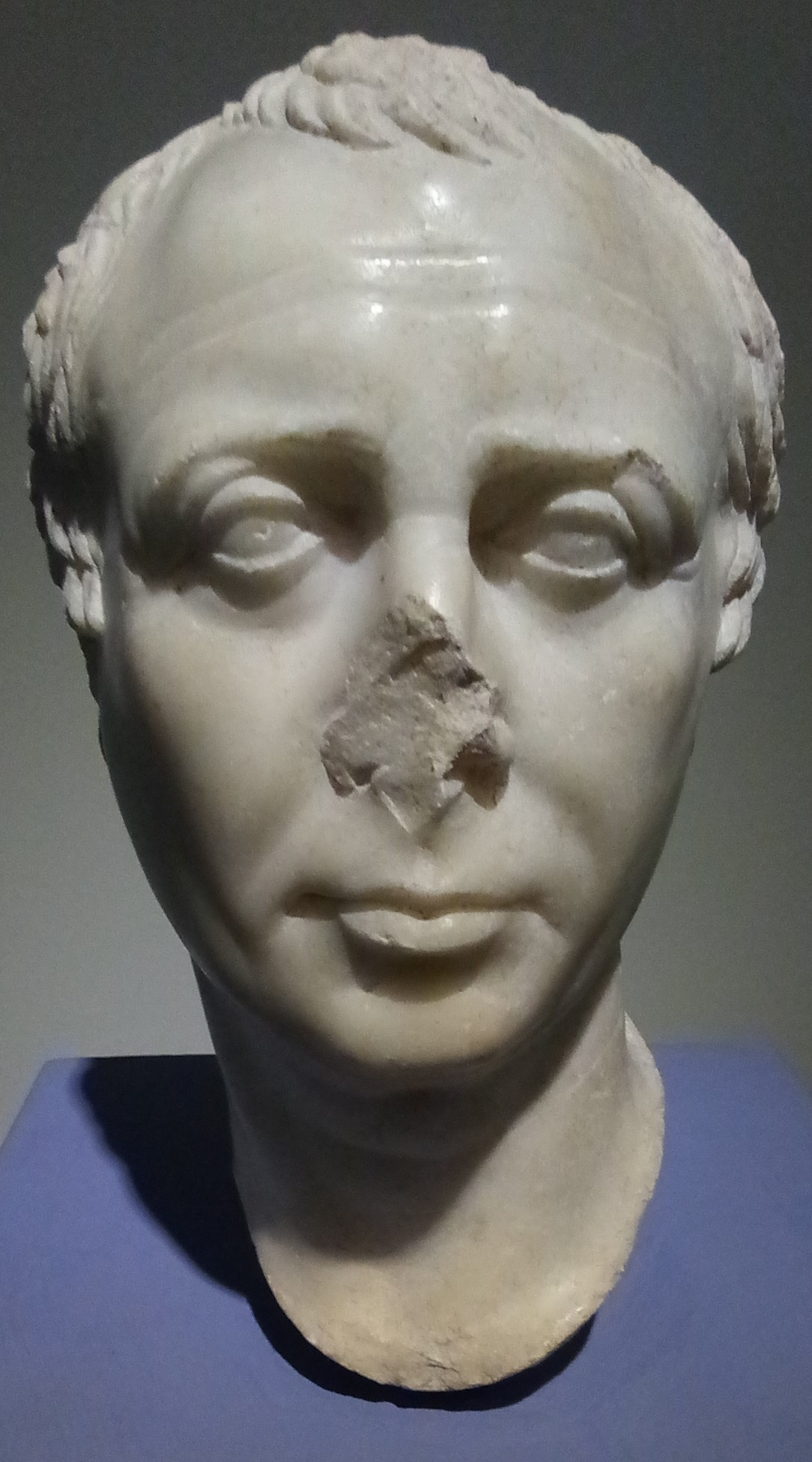
Bust of Diodorus Pasparus of Pergamum in Bergama Museum

Diodorus Pasparus (Ancient Greek: Διόδωρος Ἡρώιδου Πάσπαρος, romanized: Diodōros Hērōidou Pasparos, fl. 85-69 BC), son of Heroides, was the leading statesman and benefactor at Pergamon, in the period of the Mithridatic Wars, when the city's place within the Roman province of Asia was contested. He is known solely from a series of inscribed honorific decrees. The earliest of these is IGR IV 292 which belongs in the late 80s or 70s BC. IGR IV 293 dates to 69 BC. The others are IGR IV 294, IPergamon II 256, and MDAI(A) 35, p. 409, no. 3, which cannot be precisely dated, but all belong around 69 BC. These decrees honour him for a range of activities, including embassies to Rome, service as gymnasiarch, revival of festivals, and building works.

Diodorus is part of a class of civic leaders in the province in this period, like Aulus Aemilius Zosimus of Priene, Theophanes of Mytilene, and Theopompus of Cnidus, whose close connections with Rome and regular benefactions helped to restore the prosperity of the province's cities, thwart social unrest, and maintain good relations with Rome. Their actions laid the foundations for the close relationship between Roman power and the civic elites of Asia, which endured through the Roman Empire.

== Life ==
=== Diplomatic activity ===
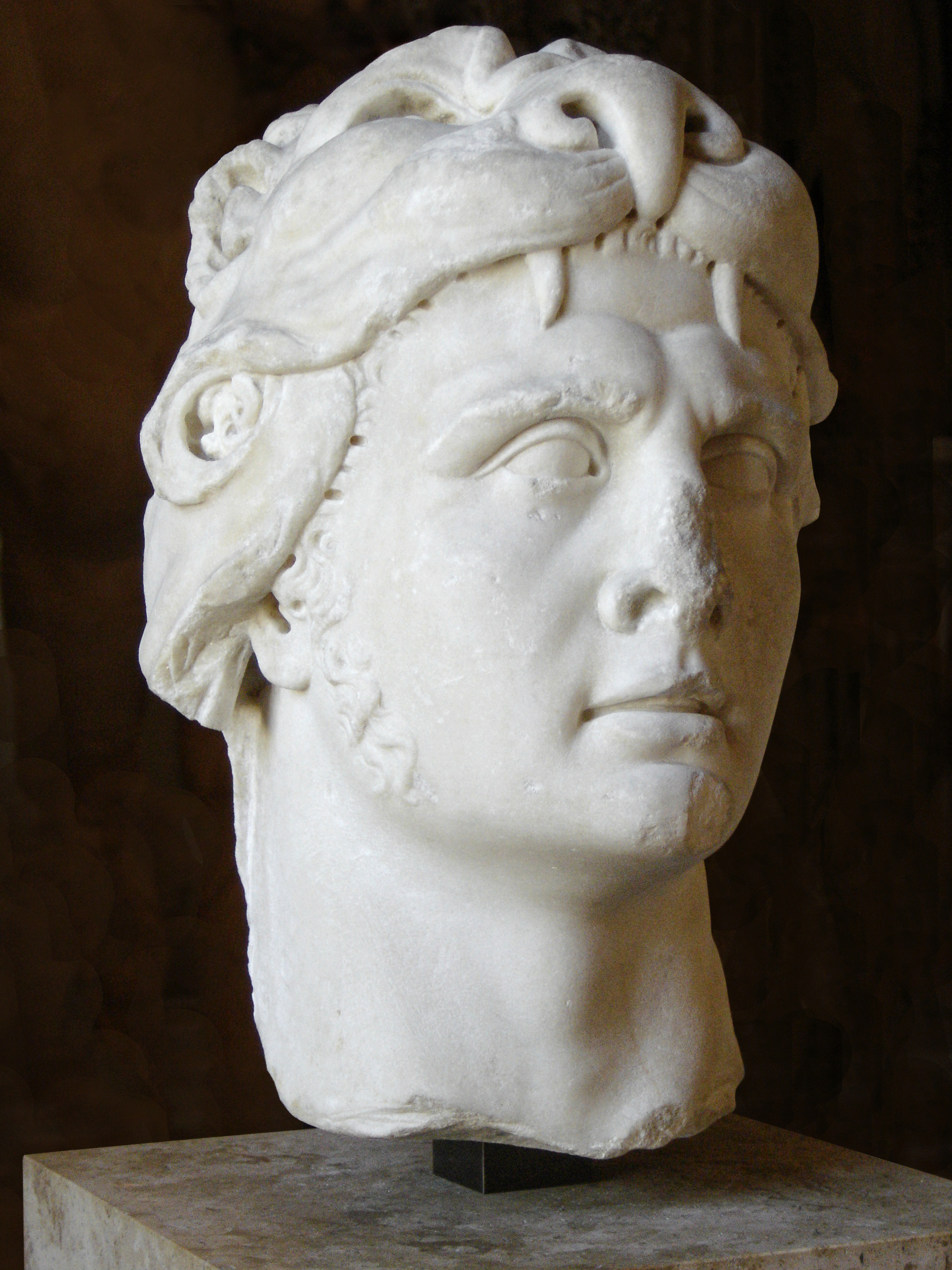
Mithridates VI, portrait in the Louvre

During the First Mithridatic War (89-85 BC), Pergamon was conquered by Mithridates VI and became his main base of operations. Following the Roman victory, Sulla treated Pergamon harshly, removing its free status, executing people linked with Mithridates and confiscating their property, charging the city an indemnity, subjecting it to tribute, and requiring it to host and support the occupying Roman legions. A financial crisis developed, during which high interest rates charged by Roman moneylenders (publicani) caused many people to lose their property.

The earliest inscription, IGR IV 292, is a decree praising Diodorus for his actions at this time. He seems to have led an embassy to Rome to get the Senate to take action against the publicani. Diodorus' embassy also seems to have complained about depredations carried out by the occupying Roman legions, the financial costs of hosting them, and the tribute that had been levied on Asia after the First Mithridatic War. During the war, Mithridates had arrested a group of Pergamene conspirators and seized their property. Diodorus secured the return of this property somehow (perhaps it had been taken by the Romans along with the rest of Mithridates' property at the end of the war). The decree records that these actions and others were central to maintaining order and harmony in Pergamon at a time of major social unrest. A similar embassy sent at this time by the League of the Greeks in Asia (to which all the cities in the province of Asia belonged) to complain about the publicani is attested in a decree at Aphrodisias (IAph2007 2.503). Several other advocates for the cities of Asia at this time are mentioned in inscriptions and literary sources.

In honour of these actions, the Pergamenes honoured Diodorus with a golden crown, a marble statue, a gilded statue, two statues on horseback, a colossal bronze statue showing him being crowned by the people, all of which were to bear the inscription:

the people honoured Diodorus son of Herōides, the hereditary priest of Zeus the Greatest and chief priest, who inherited the role of benefactor from his ancestors and has provided many great benefits to his fatherland

— IGR IV 292, lines 29-31

In addition, he received front-row seats at all festivals and games and the right to burn incense at all political meetings. A new civic tribe was established, named Paspareis in his honour. The day of his return from Rome, 8 Apollonius, became a public holiday. A benefactor cult was established for Diodorus, including a sanctuary (the Diodoreium) in Philetaerea, and an annual priest. A religious procession was to be held for the inauguration of the shrine. These cultic honours were based on the cult for Manius Aquillius, the founder of the province, and similar to the old honours for the Attalid kings.

MDAI(A) 35, p. 409, no. 2 seems to recall this diplomatic activity at a later date.

=== Gymnasiarch ===
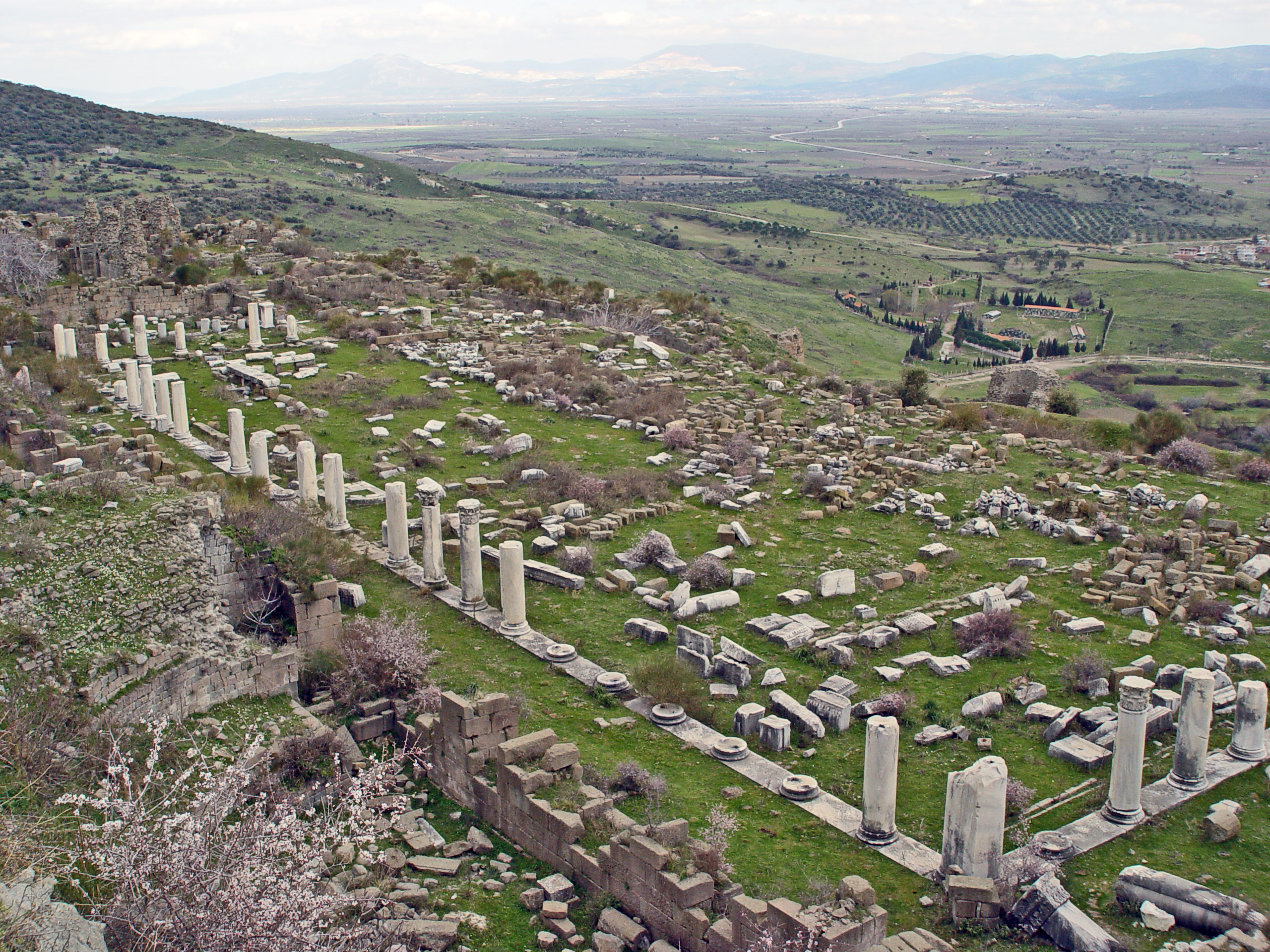
Courtyard of the Upper Gymnasium, Pergamon.

IPergamon II 256 honours Pasparus for his service as gymnasiarch (manager of the city's four gymnasia) and organiser of the 29th celebration of the Nicephoria festival, which was the first to take place after a war, and was passed immediately after the festival, while he was still in office. Older scholarship placed this in 125 BC in the aftermath of Aristonicus' revolt, but C. P. Jones established that the correct date is 69 BC, following the end of the Third Mithridatic War in Asia. The decree was passed while Pasparus was still in office as gymnasiarch and it orders a marble statue to be erected in his honour in the gymnasium of the young men (the base of this survives as MDAI(A) 32, p. 313 no. 36) and a bronze cult statue in an uncertain location. Sacrifices are to be offered to Diodorus next to the cult statue, both statues are to be given a headband and a crown whenever other statues receive those honours, and Diodorus is to receive a crown each year at the Hermaea festival, which marked the end of the gymnasiarch's year of office.

The surviving text of IGR IV 294 does not contain Diodorus' name, but it was almost certainly passed in his honour at the end of his tenure as gymnasiarch. It praises him for his actions in that role, recounted in chronological order, probably on the basis of the report that Diodorus submitted at the end of his term. He had provided olive oil in the gymnasium for boys and men; funded the festival of the Mysteries of the Cabeiri; and revived the Kriobolia ("ram slaughter") festival, which had lapsed as a result of the Third Mithridatic War and which he held on 8 Apollonius, the anniversary of his return from the embassy to Rome. He also erected statues and held sacrifices in honour of all the Attalid kings, and another statue for King Ptolemy, probably Ptolemy XII of Egypt (r. 80–51) or perhaps Ptolemy of Cyprus (r. 80–58). His actions in support of resident Romans are singled out for praise. Decree f on IGR IV 293, which is mostly lost, seems to have been the original decree giving Diodorus permission to erect (some of?) the statues mentioned in IGR IV 294.

IGR IV 293 is an inscribed column, which once stood in Pergamon's upper gymnasium. It contains six honorific decrees for Diodorus (a-f), of which b, e, and f are mostly lost. These decrees were voted at different times and inscribed on the column at a later date. Decree a honours Diodorus for the construction work that he oversaw as gymnasiarch in 69 BC. This work included the construction of a new palaestra (wrestling ground) in one of the gymnasia and it mentioned various other projects that are now lost. It also mentions his organisation of the 29th celebration of the Nicephoria festival. In honour of his achievements, an exedra was to be built for him in the gymnasium of the youths containing a cult statue of him. IGR IV 293 decree d is a later stage in the same process. It praises Diodorus for his construction work once more, saying he has conducted himself "just as if he were a second founder," mentions that he had agreed to pay for the construction of the exedra, and makes the necessary arrangements to allow him to do that. Decree e is mostly lost, but it seems to mention that Diodorus had carried out sacrifices and games previously decreed for his father, Heroides.

MDAI(A) 35, p. 409, no. 3 also honours Diodorus for his service as gymnasiarch and includes a chronological account of his activities in the role. It may be a second copy of IGR IV 294 or a decree passed in Diodorus' honour at the end of a second, otherwise unattested, tenure as gymnasiarch.

=== Further diplomacy ===
Decree c on IGR IV 293 honours Diodorus for further diplomatic activities and other unspecified good deeds, noting his "influence with the (Roman) magistrates." The decree mentions the honours granted by IGR IV 292 and 293a, so must post-date both of them. The decree augments his earlier cultic honours, by introducing prayers to him in the prytaneum and giving him the right to wear a crown and offer prayers at games and festivals.

=== Coinage ===
A set of Pergamene bronze coins. These coins bear the names of their mint magistrates, Mithradates and Diodorus. Mithradates was a friend of Julius Caesar, a witness for the prosecution of Lucius Valerius Flaccus (praetor 63 BC; son of Lucius Valerius Flaccus, consul 86 BCE) at Rome in 59 BC (subject of Cicero's Pro Flacco), and was eventually appointed king of Bosporus. The other magistrate is probably Diodorus Pasparus. C. P. Jones suggests that Mithradates succeeded Diodorus as Pergamon's leading citizen.

== List of inscriptions ==
Reference	Date	Type	Topic	Other references
IGR IV 292	85-73 BC	Decree	Diplomatic activities	MDAI(A) 32, p. 243, no. 4; Chankowski 1998 no. 5
MDAI(A) 35, p. 409, no. 2	After IGR IV 292	Decree	Diplomatic activities	Chankowski 1998 no. 11
IPergamon II 256	69 BC	Decree	Gymnasiarchy: Nicephoria	Chankowski 1998 no. 3
MDAI(A) 32, p. 313, no. 36	69 BC	Statue base	Gymnasiarchy: Nicephoria	Chankowski 1998 no. 4
IGR IV 293f	69 BC	Dossier of decrees	Permission to erect statue/s	MDAI(A) 32, p. 257, no. 8; MDAI(A) 35, p. 412, no. 4; Chankowski 1998 no. 6
IGR IV 294	69 BC	Decree	Gymnasiarchy	MDAI(A) 29, p. 152, no. 1; OGIS 764; Chankowski 1998 no. 1
IGR IV 293a	69 BC	Dossier of decrees	Gymnasiarchy: construction work	MDAI(A) 32, p. 257, no. 8; MDAI(A) 35, p. 412, no. 4; Chankowski 1998 no. 6
IGR IV 293d	69 BC	Dossier of decrees	Construction of Diodorus' exedra	MDAI(A) 32, p. 257, no. 8; MDAI(A) 35, p. 412, no. 4; Chankowski 1998 no. 6
IGR IV 293c	After 69 BC	Dossier of decrees	Diplomatic activities	MDAI(A) 32, p. 257, no. 8; MDAI(A) 35, p. 412, no. 4; Chankowski 1998 no. 6
IGR IV 293b	?	Dossier of decrees	Fragmentary	MDAI(A) 32, p. 257, no. 8; MDAI(A) 35, p. 412, no. 4; Chankowski 1998 no. 6
IGR IV 293e	?	Dossier of decrees	Sacrifices for Diodorus' father	MDAI(A) 32, p. 257, no. 8; MDAI(A) 35, p. 412, no. 4; Chankowski 1998 no. 6
MDAI(A) 35, p. 409, no. 3	69 BC or later?	Decree	Gymnasiarchy	Chankowski 1998 no. 2
MDAI(A) 32, p. 314, no. 37	?	?	Fragmentary	Chankowski 1998 no. 8
MDAI(A) 32, p. 314, no. 38	?	?	Fragmentary	MDAI(A) 35, p. 467, no. 50; Chankowski 1998 no. 9
MDAI(A) 32, p. 314, no. 39	?	Decree of neoi (young men)?	Fragmentary	Chankowski 1998 no. 10

== Bibliography ==
- Chankowski, Andrzej S. (1998). "La procédure législative à Pergame au Ier siècle au J.-C. : à propos de la chronologie relative des décrets en l'honneur de Diodoros Pasparos". Bulletin de Correspondance Hellénique. 122 (1): 159–199. doi:10.3406/bch.1998.7171.
- Corey Brennan, T. (2009). "Embassies Gone Wrong: Roman diplomacy in the Constantinian Excerpta de Legationibus". In Eilers, Claude (ed.). Diplomats and Diplomacy in the Roman World. Leiden: Brill. pp. 171–192. ISBN 9789004170988.
- Forster, Florian Rudolf (2018). Die Polis im Wandel : Ehrendekrete für eigene Bürger im Kontext der hellenistischen Polisgesellschaft. Gottingen: Vandenhoeck & Ruprecht. ISBN 9783946317197.
- Genovese, Cristina (2011). "Per eterna memoria e immortalità di un benefattore": L'Heroon di Diodoro Pasparo a Pergamo". Mediterraneo Antico. 14: 57–74.
- Jones, C. P. (1974). "Diodoros Pasparos and the Nikephoria of Pergamon". Chiron. 4: 183–206.
- Jones, C. P. (2000). "Diodoros Pasparos Revisited". Chiron. 30: 1–14. doi:10.34780/l39d-c2c9.
- Musti, D. (1998). "I Nikephoria e il ruolo panellenico di Pergamo". Rivista di Filologia e di Istruzione Classica. 126: 5–40.
- Robert, Louis (1981). "Une épigramme satirique d'Automédon et Athènes au début de l'Empire (Anth. Pal. XI-319)". Revue des Études Grecques. 94 (447): 338–361. doi:10.3406/reg.1981.1291.
- Virgilio, B. (1994). "La città ellenistica e i suoi "benefattori": Pergamo e Diodoro Pasparo". Athenaeum. 82: 299–314.
