= Rotonda de los Hombres Ilustres, Chihuahua City =

Rotonda de los Hombres Ilustres (Rotunda of Illustrious Men) is a victory column in Chihuahua, Chih., Mexico. It is there in honor of important men in Chihuahua's history. The landmark is a column with a Winged Victory on top.

The men buried there are:

- Bernardo Revilla 1798-1879
- Gral. Angel Trías 1809-1867
- Cor. Jesus José Casavantes 1809-1884
- Lic. Laureano Muñoz 1815-1883
- José Eligio Muñoz 1819-1891
- Profr. Jose María Mari 1820-1899
- Cadete Agustín Melgar 1829-1847
- Cor. Joaquín Terrazas 1829-1901
- Cor. Angel Peralta 1830-1876
- Gral. Manuel Ojinaga 1833-1865
- Abraham González 1864-1913
- Gral. Toribio Ortega 1870-1914
- Daniel Muñoz Lumbier
- Cayetano Justiniani
- Gral. Miguel Ahumada 1844-1917
- Práxedis Guerrero
