= 2024 Mexican local elections =

- 2 June 2024

8 governorships 1 head of government 31 state congresses 1,580 municipalities
- PAN hold MC hold Morena hold Morena gain No election PAN-led hold PVEM-led hold Morena-led hold Morena-led gain No overall control No election

The 2024 Mexican local elections were held on 2 June 2024, during which voters elected eight governors for six-year terms, the Head of Government of Mexico City for a six-year term, deputies for thirty-one state congresses, and officials for 1,580 municipalities. These elections took place concurrently with the country's general election.

Before the elections, the country's two main coalitions, Juntos Hacemos Historia and Va por México, were succeeded by Sigamos Haciendo Historia and Fuerza y Corazón por México, which constituted the same parties as their predecessors. Of the governorships up for election, Sigamos Haciendo Historia currently held six, Fuerza y Corazón por México held two, and Citizens' Movement – participating without coalition support – had one. These were the first gubernatorial elections where most of the seats were held by a MORENA-led coalition.

In what was described as a "cherry tsunami", the Sigamos Haciendo Historia coalition successfully defended its existing gubernatorial seats, flipped Yucatán from the National Action Party, and secured majorities in 27 of the 31 state congresses up for election. This would facilitate the passage of constitutional amendments, which require approval from most state legislatures.

== Electoral system ==
=== Gubernatorial elections ===
Each state's governor is elected by plurality voting in a single round. Article 116 of the Mexican Constitution limits each governor to a single six-year term, prohibiting anyone who has previously served as governor, even on a caretaker basis, from running for or holding the office again. Swearing-in dates for governors vary by state, as determined by each state's constitution.

== Incidents ==
=== Assassinations ===
Since January 2024, at least 27 aspiring candidates for political office have been killed, while at least 828 non-lethal attacks on candidates have been recorded. This has led to the government providing security guards to around 560 candidates and election officials. Around 27,000 personnel of the Mexican Armed Forces and the National Guard have also been deployed to secure the electoral process.

In Maravatío, Michoacán, Dagoberto García, the head of the MORENA party in the municipality and an aspiring candidate for mayor, disappeared in October 2023 and was found dead the following month. On 26 February 2024, Miguel Ángel Zavala, another aspiring mayoral candidate of MORENA in the town, was found fatally shot in his car. The following day, Armando Pérez Luna, the PAN's mayoral candidate in the same city, was also found shot dead in his car.

On 5 January, the PRI candidate for mayor of Suchiate, Chiapas, and the Citizens' Movement candidate for mayor in Armeria, Colima, were killed in separate attacks. In Guerrero, Alfredo González, a mayoral candidate in Atoyac de Álvarez, was killed in early March, followed by Tomás Morales, a prospective mayoral candidate of MORENA in Chilapa de Álvarez, on 12 March.

In late March, the mayor of Churumuco, Michoacán, was shot dead in Morelia. On 1 April, Bertha Gisela Gaytán, a mayoral candidate for MORENA, was shot dead while campaigning outside Celaya, Guanajuato, along with city council candidate Adrián Guerrero. On 19 April, Noé Ramos Ferretiz, the joint PAN-PRI mayoral candidate for Ciudad Mante, Tamaulipas, was found fatally stabbed, while Alberto García, a mayoral candidate in San José Independencia, Oaxaca, was found beaten to death. On 16 May, Lucero López Maza, a mayoral candidate in La Concordia, Chiapas, was killed along with five others during a gun attack on a campaign rally. On 28 May, Ricardo Arizmendi, an alternate mayoral candidate in Cuautla, Morelos, was shot dead by gunmen on motorcycles. On 31 May, Jorge Huerta Cabrera, a mayoral candidate in Izúcar de Matamoros, Puebla, was shot dead in a gun attack at a campaign rally that also injured his wife and another person.

On 1 June, authorities ordered the suspension of voting in the municipalities of Pantelhó and Chicomuselo in Chiapas, citing the burning of election papers in the former by unknown individuals on 31 May and threats against poll workers by gang members. Hours before polling opened on 2 June, Israel Delgado, a candidate for the municipal council of Cuitzeo, Michoacan, was shot dead by motorcycled gunmen. While voting was underway, two people were killed in shootings at polling stations at Coyomeapan and Tlanalapan in Puebla.

=== Disasters ===
On 22 May, a stage being used by Citizens' Movement mayoral candidate Lorenia Canavati for a campaign rally that was also attended by presidential candidate Jorge Álvarez Máynez was toppled by strong winds in San Pedro Garza García, Nuevo León, killing ten people, including a child, and injuring 213 others. Álvarez Máynez was unharmed.

== Gubernatorial races summary ==
State	Incumbent	Elected
Chiapas	Rutilio Escandón (MORENA)	Eduardo Ramírez Aguilar (MORENA)
Mexico City	Martí Batres (MORENA)	Clara Brugada (MORENA)
Guanajuato	Diego Sinhué Rodríguez Vallejo (PAN)	Libia García Muñoz Ledo (PAN)
Jalisco	Enrique Alfaro Ramírez (MC)	Pablo Lemus Navarro (MC)
Morelos	Cuauhtémoc Blanco (PES)	Margarita González Saravia (MORENA)
Puebla	Sergio Salomón Céspedes (MORENA)	Alejandro Armenta Mier (MORENA)
Tabasco	Carlos Manuel Merino Campos (MORENA)	Javier May Rodríguez (MORENA)
Veracruz	Cuitláhuac García Jiménez (MORENA)	Rocío Nahle (MORENA)
Yucatán	Mauricio Vila Dosal (PAN)	Joaquín Díaz Mena (MORENA)

== Aguascalientes ==
=== 2024 Congress of Aguascalientes election ===
All 27 seats of the Congress of Aguascalientes were up for election, where 18 were elected through first-past-the-post voting and 9 through proportional representation. Deputies were elected to serve three-year terms in the LXVI Legislature and took office on 15 September 2024.

Party	Seats			Change
Party	Constituency	Party-list	Total	Change
National Action Party	13	0	13	Steady
National Regeneration Movement	0	7	7	▲1
Party of the Democratic Revolution	4	0	4	Steady
Institutional Revolutionary Party	1	0	1	Steady
Ecologist Green Party of Mexico	0	1	1	Steady
Citizens' Movement	0	1	1	Steady
Total	18	9	27	

=== 2024 Aguascalientes municipal elections ===
All positions of Aguascalientes' 11 municipalities were up for election. Elected officials began their three-year terms on 15 October 2024.

Party	Municipalities
National Action Party	5
Institutional Revolutionary Party	2
National Regeneration Movement	2
Party of the Democratic Revolution	1
Independents	1
Total	11

== Baja California ==
=== 2024 Congress of Baja California election ===
All 25 seats of the Congress of Baja California were up for election, where 17 were elected through first-past-the-post voting and 8 through proportional representation. Deputies were elected to serve three-year terms in the XXV Legislature and took office on 1 August 2024.

Party	Seats			Change
Party	Constituency	Party-list	Total	Change
National Regeneration Movement	14	0	14	▲1
National Action Party	0	3	3	Steady
Ecologist Green Party of Mexico	1	1	2	▲1
Citizens' Movement	0	1	1	Steady
Labor Party	0	1	1	▼2
Institutional Revolutionary Party	0	1	1	Steady
Solidarity Encounter Party	0	1	1	▼2
Force for Mexico	1	0	1	▲1
No party	1	1	0	▲1
Total	17	8	25	

=== 2024 Baja California municipal elections ===
All positions of Baja California's seven municipalities were up for election. This marked the first election in which the newly established municipalities of San Felipe and San Quintín elected their municipal presidents. Elected officials began their three-year terms on 1 October 2024.

The National Regeneration Movement (Morena) won all seven municipalities. The closest election, in San Felipe, was decided by a margin of 297 votes.

Party	Municipalities
National Regeneration Movement	7
Total	7

== Baja California Sur ==
=== 2024 Congress of Baja California Sur election ===
All 21 seats of the Congress of Baja California Sur were up for election, where 16 were elected through first-past-the-post voting and 5 through proportional representation. Deputies were elected to serve three-year terms in the XVII Legislature and took office on 1 September 2024.

Party	Seats			Change
Party	Constituency	Party-list	Total	Change
National Regeneration Movement	12	0	12	▲3
Labor Party	3	1	4	Steady
New Alliance Party	1	1	2	▲1
Ecologist Green Party of Mexico	0	1	1	▲1
National Action Party	0	1	1	Steady
Institutional Revolutionary Party	0	1	1	▼1
Total	16	5	21	

=== 2024 Baja California Sur municipal elections ===
All positions of Baja California Sur's five municipalities were up for election. Elected officials began their three-year terms on 1 October 2024.

Party	Municipalities
National Regeneration Movement	3
Labor Party	1
National Action Party	1
Total	5

== Campeche ==
=== 2024 Congress of Campeche election ===
All 35 seats of the Congress of Campeche were up for election, where 21 were elected through first-past-the-post voting and 14 through proportional representation. Deputies were elected to serve three-year terms in the LXV Legislature and took office on 1 October 2024.

Party	Seats			Change
Party	Constituency	Party-list	Total	Change
National Regeneration Movement	12	4	16	▼2
Citizens' Movement	6	4	10	▲5
Institutional Revolutionary Party	1	2	3	▼3
Labor Party	1	1	2	▲2
Ecologist Green Party of Mexico	1	1	2	▲2
National Action Party	0	2	2	▲1
Total	21	14	35	

=== 2024 Campeche municipal elections ===
All positions of Campeche's 13 municipalities were up for election. Elected officials began their three-year terms on 1 October 2024.

Citizens' Movement and Sigamos Haciendo Historia made significant gains in the state, flipping three and four municipalities, respectively. Hopelchén became the Institutional Revolutionary Party's last bastion in the state.

Party	Municipalities
National Regeneration Movement	4
Citizens' Movement	4
Labor Party	3
Institutional Revolutionary Party	1
Ecologist Green Party of Mexico	1
Total	13

== Chiapas ==
=== 2024 Chiapas gubernatorial election ===
Voters elected a new governor to serve a single six-year term through first-past-the-post voting, with the term beginning on 8 December 2024.

Eduardo Ramírez Aguilar, a member of the National Regeneration Movement (Morena), was nominated by Sigamos Haciendo Historia por Chiapas. That coalition included Morena, the Ecologist Green Party of Mexico (PVEM), the Labor Party (PT), and six other local parties. Olga Luz Espinosa, representing the Party of the Democratic Revolution (PRD), was nominated by Fuerza y Corazón por Chiapas, comprising the Institutional Revolutionary Party (PRI), the National Action Party (PAN), and the PRD. Karla Irasema Muñoz Balanzár was nominated by Citizens' Movement (MC), which did not form any coalitions. Polling consistently showed Ramírez Aguilar leading by margins of 15 to 20 points.

Ramírez Aguilar ultimately won the election by a landslide, securing victory with a margin of over 70 points.

Candidate	Party or alliance		Votes	%
Eduardo Ramírez Aguilar	Sigamos Haciendo Historia por Chiapas	National Regeneration Movement	930,765	41.60
Eduardo Ramírez Aguilar	Sigamos Haciendo Historia por Chiapas	Ecologist Green Party of Mexico	448,875	20.06
Eduardo Ramírez Aguilar	Sigamos Haciendo Historia por Chiapas	Labor Party	237,534	10.62
Eduardo Ramírez Aguilar	Sigamos Haciendo Historia por Chiapas	Progressive Social Networks	78,823	3.52
Eduardo Ramírez Aguilar	Sigamos Haciendo Historia por Chiapas	Chiapas Unido	58,232	2.60
Eduardo Ramírez Aguilar	Sigamos Haciendo Historia por Chiapas	Podemos Mover a Chiapas	52,533	2.35
Eduardo Ramírez Aguilar	Sigamos Haciendo Historia por Chiapas	Solidarity Encounter Party	32,426	1.45
Eduardo Ramírez Aguilar	Sigamos Haciendo Historia por Chiapas	Force for Mexico	15,070	0.67
Eduardo Ramírez Aguilar	Sigamos Haciendo Historia por Chiapas	Partido Popular Chiapaneco	11,932	0.53
Eduardo Ramírez Aguilar	Sigamos Haciendo Historia por Chiapas	Total	1,866,190	83.41
Olga Luz Espinosa	Fuerza y Corazón por Chiapas	Institutional Revolutionary Party	171,418	7.66
Olga Luz Espinosa	Fuerza y Corazón por Chiapas	National Action Party	82,669	3.70
Olga Luz Espinosa	Fuerza y Corazón por Chiapas	Party of the Democratic Revolution	29,845	1.33
Olga Luz Espinosa	Fuerza y Corazón por Chiapas	Total	283,932	12.69
Karla Irasema Muñoz Balanzár	Citizens' Movement		84,727	3.79
Non-registered candidates			2,432	0.11
Total			2,237,281	100.00
Valid votes			2,237,281	95.06
Invalid/blank votes			116,290	4.94
Total votes			2,353,571	100.00
Registered voters/turnout			3,944,346	59.67
Source: IEPC

=== 2024 Congress of Chiapas election ===
All 40 seats of the Congress of Chiapas were up for election, where 24 were elected through first-past-the-post voting and 16 through proportional representation. Deputies were elected to serve three-year terms in the LXIX Legislature and took office on 1 October 2024.

Party	Seats			Change
Party	Constituency	Party-list	Total	Change
National Regeneration Movement	8	4	12	▼3
Ecologist Green Party of Mexico	6	3	9	▼1
Labor Party	4	2	6	Steady
Institutional Revolutionary Party	0	2	2	Steady
Citizens' Movement	0	2	2	▲2
National Action Party	0	2	2	▲1
Progressive Social Networks	1	1	2	▲1
Chiapas Unido	2	0	2	Steady
Podemos Mover a Chiapas	2	0	2	Steady
Social Encounter Party	1	0	1	Steady
Total	24	16	40	

=== 2024 Chiapas municipal elections ===
All positions in 123 of Chiapas' 124 municipalities were up for election. The exception is Oxchuc, which operates outside the political party system, electing its authorities through "usos y costumbres" (lit. 'uses and customs'). Elected officials began their three-year terms on 1 October 2024.

In three municipalities, local councils were not elected during the June 2024 elections: in Chicomuselo, an armed group burned the ballots before election day; in Pantelhó, elections were canceled due to the risk of violence stemming from a conflict between two criminal groups; and in Capitán Luis Ángel Vidal, the ballot boxes were destroyed after the election. While councils in Chicomuselo and Capitán Luis Ángel Vidal were elected in August 2024, elections in Pantelhó were canceled again due to continued threats of violence. In September 2024, the Congress of Chiapas appointed a council.

Party	Municipalities
National Regeneration Movement	40
Ecologist Green Party of Mexico	29
Labor Party	17
Progressive Social Networks	15
Institutional Revolutionary Party	6
Podemos Mover a Chiapas	5
Chiapas Unido	4
Citizens' Movement	2
National Action Party	1
Party of the Democratic Revolution	1
Social Encounter Party	1
Independents	1
Total	123

== Chihuahua ==
=== 2024 Congress of Chihuahua election ===
All 33 seats of the Congress of Chihuahua were up for election, where 22 were elected through first-past-the-post voting and 11 through proportional representation. Deputies were elected to serve three-year terms in the LXVIII Legislature and took office on 1 September 2024.

Party	Seats			Change
Party	Constituency	Party-list	Total	Change
National Action Party	11	1	12	▼3
National Regeneration Movement	7	5	12	▲2
Institutional Revolutionary Party	3	2	5	Steady
Labor Party	1	1	2	▲1
Citizens' Movement	0	1	1	▼1
Ecologist Green Party of Mexico	0	1	1	▲1
Total	22	11	33	

=== 2024 Chihuahua municipal elections ===
All positions of Chihuahua's 67 municipalities were up for election. Elected officials began their three-year terms on 10 September 2024.

The National Regeneration Movement (Morena) disrupted the political dominance of the Institutional Revolutionary Party (PRI) and the National Action Party (PAN) at the municipal level in the state. Morena, along with its allies, the Ecologist Green Party of Mexico (PVEM) and the Labor Party (PT), made gains in the state's mountainous areas, securing 21 municipalities compared to 13 in 2021. The PRI and PAN, which collectively won 45 municipalities in 2021, saw their total reduced to 37 in 2024. Both Morena and the PAN retained control of the key municipalities of Juárez and Chihuahua, respectively.

Party	Municipalities
Institutional Revolutionary Party	19
National Action Party	18
National Regeneration Movement	16
Citizens' Movement	4
Party of the Democratic Revolution	3
Ecologist Green Party of Mexico	3
Labor Party	2
Partido Pueblo	2
Total	67

== Mexico City ==
=== 2024 Mexico City Head of Government election ===
Voters elected a new Head of Government, a position equivalent to a governor, to serve a single six-year term through first-past-the-post voting, with the term beginning on 5 October 2024.

Clara Brugada, mayor of Iztapalapa, was nominated by Sigamos Haciendo Historia por la CDMX, comprising the National Regeneration Movement (Morena), the Ecologist Green Party of Mexico (PVEM), and the Labor Party (PT). Santiago Taboada, mayor of Benito Juárez, was nominated by Va por la CDMX, comprising the National Action Party (PAN), the Institutional Revolutionary Party (PRI), and the Party of the Democratic Revolution (PRD). Citizens' Movement (MC) nominated Salomón Chertorivski. Polling favored Brugada, although in the later stages of the campaign, Taboada closed the gap between both candidates.

Brugada won the election, beating Taboada by over 13 points.

Candidate	Party or alliance		Votes	%
Clara Brugada	Sigamos Haciendo Historia en la CDMX	National Regeneration Movement	2,350,250	43.03
Clara Brugada	Sigamos Haciendo Historia en la CDMX	Ecologist Green Party of Mexico	292,806	5.36
Clara Brugada	Sigamos Haciendo Historia en la CDMX	Labor Party	245,041	4.49
Clara Brugada	Sigamos Haciendo Historia en la CDMX	Total	2,888,097	52.88
Santiago Taboada	Va por la CDMX	National Action Party	1,570,718	28.76
Santiago Taboada	Va por la CDMX	Institutional Revolutionary Party	421,631	7.72
Santiago Taboada	Va por la CDMX	Party of the Democratic Revolution	166,242	3.04
Santiago Taboada	Va por la CDMX	Total	2,161,591	39.58
Salomón Chertorivski	Citizens' Movement		410,024	7.51
Non-registered candidates			5,280	0.10
Total			5,461,992	100.00
Valid votes			5,461,992	98.41
Invalid/blank votes			88,227	1.59
Total votes			5,550,219	100.00
Registered voters/turnout			8,005,840	69.33
Source: IECM

=== 2024 Congress of Mexico City election ===
All 66 seats of the Congress of Mexico City were up for election, where 33 were elected through first-past-the-post voting and 33 through proportional representation. Deputies were elected to serve three-year terms in the III Legislature and took office on 1 September 2024.

Party	Seats			Change
Party	Constituency	Party-list	Total	Change
National Regeneration Movement	13	10	23	▼8
National Action Party	6	9	15	▼2
Ecologist Green Party of Mexico	8	4	12	▲10
Labor Party	6	3	9	▲8
Citizens' Movement	0	3	3	▲2
Institutional Revolutionary Party	0	3	3	▼6
Party of the Democratic Revolution	0	1	1	▼4
Total	33	33	66	

=== 2024 Mexico City borough elections ===
All positions in Mexico City's 16 boroughs were up for election. Elected officials began their three-year terms on 1 October 2024.

The National Regeneration Movement (Morena) regained control of four boroughs it had lost in 2021: Álvaro Obregón, Azcapotzalco, Magdalena Contreras, and Tlalpan.

Party	Boroughs
National Regeneration Movement	9
National Action Party	4
Ecologist Green Party of Mexico	1
Labor Party	1
Institutional Revolutionary Party	1
Total	16

== Coahuila ==
=== 2024 Coahuila municipal elections ===
All positions of Coahuila's 38 municipalities were up for election. Elected officials began their three-year terms on 1 January 2025.

Party	Municipalities
Institutional Revolutionary Party	25
National Regeneration Movement	4
Party of the Democratic Revolution	2
Labor Party	2
Unidad Democrática de Coahuila	2
National Action Party	1
Ecologist Green Party of Mexico	1
Citizens' Movement	1
Total	38

== Colima ==
=== 2024 Congress of Colima election ===
All 25 seats of the Congress of Colima were up for election, where 16 were elected through first-past-the-post voting and 9 through proportional representation. Deputies were elected to serve three-year terms in the LXI Legislature and took office on 1 October 2024.

Party	Seats			Change
Party	Constituency	Party-list	Total	Change
National Regeneration Movement	9	2	11	▲1
Labor Party	3	0	3	▼1
Ecologist Green Party of Mexico	2	1	3	▲1
National Action Party	1	2	3	Steady
Institutional Revolutionary Party	1	2	3	▼2
Citizens' Movement	0	1	1	Steady
New Alliance Party	0	1	1	Steady
Total	16	9	25	

=== 2024 Colima municipal elections ===
All positions of Colima's 10 municipalities were up for election. Elected officials began their three-year terms on 15 October 2024.

Party	Municipalities
National Regeneration Movement	5
National Action Party	3
New Alliance Party	2
Total	10

== Durango ==
=== 2024 Congress of Durango election ===
All 25 seats of the Congress of Durango were up for election, where 15 were elected through first-past-the-post voting and 10 through proportional representation. Deputies were elected to serve three-year terms in the LXX Legislature and took office on 1 September 2024.

Party	Seats			Change
Party	Constituency	Party-list	Total	Change
National Regeneration Movement	5	4	9	▲2
Institutional Revolutionary Party	4	3	7	▼1
National Action Party	3	2	5	▼1
Ecologist Green Party of Mexico	3	0	3	▲2
Citizens' Movement	0	1	1	▲1
Total	15	10	25	

== Guanajuato ==
=== 2024 Guanajuato gubernatorial election ===
Voters elected a new governor to serve a single six-year term through first-past-the-post voting, with the term beginning on 26 September 2024.

Libia García Muñoz Ledo, a former member of Governor Diego Rodríguez Vallejo's cabinet, was nominated by Fuerza y Corazón por Guanajuato, comprising the National Action Party (PAN), the Institutional Revolutionary Party (PRI), and the Party of the Democratic Revolution (PRD). Alma Alcaraz, a member of the Congress of Guanajuato, was nominated by Sigamos Haciendo Historia por Guanajuato, comprising the National Regeneration Movement (Morena), the Ecologist Green Party of Mexico (PVEM), and the Labor Party (PT). Yulma Rocha Aguilar was nominated by Citizens' Movement (MC). Polls consistently favored García Muñoz Ledo, who maintained support above 50% throughout the campaign.

García Muñoz Ledo won the election by approximately 10 points, becoming the first woman elected to the office.

Candidate	Party or alliance		Votes	%
Libia García Muñoz Ledo	Fuerza y Corazón por Guanajuato	National Action Party	1,196,330	44.88
Libia García Muñoz Ledo	Fuerza y Corazón por Guanajuato	Institutional Revolutionary Party	160,788	6.03
Libia García Muñoz Ledo	Fuerza y Corazón por Guanajuato	Party of the Democratic Revolution	36,683	1.38
Libia García Muñoz Ledo	Fuerza y Corazón por Guanajuato	Total	1,393,801	52.29
Alma Alcaraz	Sigamos Haciendo Historia en Guanajuato	National Regeneration Movement	938,299	35.20
Alma Alcaraz	Sigamos Haciendo Historia en Guanajuato	Ecologist Green Party of Mexico	116,666	4.38
Alma Alcaraz	Sigamos Haciendo Historia en Guanajuato	Labor Party	62,138	2.33
Alma Alcaraz	Sigamos Haciendo Historia en Guanajuato	Total	1,117,103	41.91
Yulma Rocha Aguilar	Citizens' Movement		153,679	5.77
Non-registered candidates			1,131	0.04
Total			2,665,714	100.00
Valid votes			2,665,714	97.95
Invalid/blank votes			55,916	2.05
Total votes			2,721,630	100.00
Registered voters/turnout			4,864,173	55.95
Source: IEEG

=== 2024 Congress of Guanajuato election ===
All 36 seats of the Congress of Guanajuato were up for election, where 22 were elected through first-past-the-post voting and 14 through proportional representation. Deputies were elected to serve three-year terms in the LXVI Legislature and took office on 25 September 2024.

Party	Seats			Change
Party	Constituency	Party-list	Total	Change
National Action Party	12	4	16	▼5
National Regeneration Movement	5	5	10	▲2
Institutional Revolutionary Party	1	2	3	▼1
Labor Party	2	0	2	▲2
Ecologist Green Party of Mexico	1	1	2	Steady
Citizens' Movement	0	2	2	▲1
Party of the Democratic Revolution	0	1	1	▲1
Total	21	15	36	

=== 2024 Guanajuato municipal elections ===
All positions of Guanajuato's 46 municipalities were up for election. Elected officials began their three-year terms on 10 October 2024.

The National Regeneration Movement (Morena) gained ten municipalities compared to 2021, flipping several strongholds previously held by the National Action Party (PAN) and the Institutional Revolutionary Party (PRI).

Party	Municipalities
National Action Party	20
National Regeneration Movement	13
Institutional Revolutionary Party	6
Ecologist Green Party of Mexico	2
Citizens' Movement	2
Party of the Democratic Revolution	1
Labor Party	1
Independents	1
Total	46

== Guerrero ==
=== 2024 Congress of Guerrero election ===
All 46 seats of the Congress of Guerrero were up for election, where 28 were elected through first-past-the-post voting and 18 through proportional representation. Deputies were elected to serve three-year terms in the LXIV Legislature and took office on 1 September 2024.

Party	Seats			Change
Party	Constituency	Party-list	Total	Change
National Regeneration Movement	16	6	22	Steady
Ecologist Green Party of Mexico	4	2	6	▲4
Institutional Revolutionary Party	3	3	6	▼5
Labor Party	3	2	5	▲4
Party of the Democratic Revolution	2	2	4	▼5
Citizens' Movement	0	2	2	▲2
National Action Party	0	1	1	Steady
Total	28	18	46	

=== 2024 Guerrero municipal elections ===
All positions in 83 of Guerrero's 85 municipalities were up for election. This marked the first election in which the newly established municipalities of Las Vigas, San Nicolás, and Santa Cruz del Rincón elected their municipal presidents. Ayutla de los Libres and Ñuu Savi, the latter also newly established, operate outside the political party system, electing its authorities through "usos y costumbres" (lit. 'uses and customs'). Elected officials began their three-year terms on 30 September 2024.

Party	Municipalities
National Regeneration Movement	16
Labor Party	16
Ecologist Green Party of Mexico	15
Institutional Revolutionary Party	12
Party of the Democratic Revolution	12
Citizens' Movement	5
National Action Party	2
Partido del Bienestar de Guerrero	2
Solidarity Encounter Party	1
Partido México Avanza	1
Partido de la Sustentabilidad Guerrerense	1
Total	83

== Hidalgo ==
=== 2024 Congress of Hidalgo election ===
All 30 seats of the Congress of Hidalgo were up for election, where 18 were elected through first-past-the-post voting and 12 through proportional representation. Deputies were elected to serve three-year terms in the LXVI Legislature and took office on 5 September 2024.

Party	Seats			Change
Party	Constituency	Party-list	Total	Change
National Regeneration Movement	14	0	14	▲3
New Alliance Party	4	2	6	▲4
Labor Party	0	3	3	▼1
Institutional Revolutionary Party	0	2	2	▼6
Ecologist Green Party of Mexico	0	2	2	Steady
Citizens' Movement	0	2	2	▲2
National Action Party	0	1	1	▼1
Total	18	12	30	

=== 2024 Hidalgo municipal elections ===
All positions of Hidalgo's 84 municipalities were up for election. Elected officials began their three-year terms on 5 September 2024.

The election in Cuautepec de Hinojosa was annulled following the destruction of half of the ballots.

Party	Municipalities
National Regeneration Movement	45
Labor Party	14
New Alliance Party	6
Party of the Democratic Revolution	4
Ecologist Green Party of Mexico	4
National Action Party	4
Institutional Revolutionary Party	3
Citizens' Movement	3
Total	84

== Jalisco ==
=== 2024 Jalisco gubernatorial election ===
Voters elected a new governor to serve a single six-year term through first-past-the-post voting, with the term beginning on 6 December 2024.

Pablo Lemus Navarro, the municipal president of Guadalajara, was nominated by Citizens' Movement (MC). Claudia Delgadillo González, the federal deputy for Jalisco's 11th district, was nominated by Sigamos Haciendo Historia en Jalisco, comprising the National Regeneration Movement (Morena), the Ecologist Green Party of Mexico (PVEM), the Labor Party (PT), and two local parties. Laura Haro Ramírez, a plurinominal deputy for the first electoral region, was nominated by Fuerza y Corazón por Jalisco, comprising the National Action Party (PAN), the Institutional Revolutionary Party (PRI), and the Party of the Democratic Revolution (PRD).

Polling consistently indicated that the gubernatorial race was primarily between Pablo Lemus Navarro and Claudia Delgadillo González, who held a significant lead over Laura Haro Ramírez. Throughout the campaign, the gap between Lemus Navarro and Delgadillo González narrowed considerably, with several pollsters reporting that the race had tightened to within the margin of error.

Pablo Lemus Navarro won the gubernatorial election by a margin of 5 points, approximately 200,000 votes, ensuring that Citizens' Movement retained the governorship. Claudia Delgadillo González contested the results, citing alleged irregularities, including improper handling of ballots, and accused the Electoral and Citizen Participation Institute of the State of Jalisco of complicity. She sought to have the election annulled, but federal electoral authorities dismissed her claims due to a lack of evidence. On 16 October 2024, the Federal Electoral Tribunal confirmed Lemus Navarro's victory.

Candidate	Party or alliance		Votes	%
Pablo Lemus Navarro	Citizens' Movement		1,631,929	44.18
Claudia Delgadillo González	Sigamos Haciendo Historia en Jalisco	National Regeneration Movement	1,061,038	28.72
Claudia Delgadillo González	Sigamos Haciendo Historia en Jalisco	Ecologist Green Party of Mexico	160,154	4.34
Claudia Delgadillo González	Sigamos Haciendo Historia en Jalisco	Labor Party	84,990	2.30
Claudia Delgadillo González	Sigamos Haciendo Historia en Jalisco	Hagamos	72,535	1.96
Claudia Delgadillo González	Sigamos Haciendo Historia en Jalisco	Futuro	66,927	1.81
Claudia Delgadillo González	Sigamos Haciendo Historia en Jalisco	Total	1,445,644	39.14
Laura Haro Ramírez	Fuerza y Corazón por Jalisco	National Action Party	329,567	8.92
Laura Haro Ramírez	Fuerza y Corazón por Jalisco	Institutional Revolutionary Party	245,874	6.66
Laura Haro Ramírez	Fuerza y Corazón por Jalisco	Party of the Democratic Revolution	34,177	0.93
Laura Haro Ramírez	Fuerza y Corazón por Jalisco	Total	609,618	16.50
Non-registered candidates			6,794	0.18
Total			3,693,985	100.00
Valid votes			3,693,985	97.76
Invalid/blank votes			84,831	2.24
Total votes			3,778,816	100.00
Registered voters/turnout			6,619,341	57.09
Source: IEPC Jalisco

=== 2024 Congress of Jalisco election ===
All 38 seats of the Congress of Jalisco were up for election, where 20 were elected through first-past-the-post voting and 18 through proportional representation. Deputies were elected to serve three-year terms in the LXIV Legislature and took office on 1 November 2024.

Party	Seats			Change
Party	Constituency	Party-list	Total	Change
Citizens' Movement	4	7	11	▼5
National Regeneration Movement	4	6	10	▲2
National Action Party	2	3	5	Steady
Hagamos	3	0	3	▲1
Institutional Revolutionary Party	1	2	3	▼2
Ecologist Green Party of Mexico	2	0	2	▲1
Futuro	2	0	2	▲1
Labor Party	2	0	2	▲2
Total	20	18	38	

=== 2024 Jalisco municipal elections ===
All positions of Jalisco's 125 municipalities were up for election. Elected officials began their three-year terms on 1 October 2024.

The election results divided Jalisco among three major political forces. Citizens' Movement (MC), the ruling party, lost 28 municipalities, retained 20, and gained 20 while maintaining control over more than half of the state's population. MC consolidated its hold on key metropolitan areas, including Guadalajara, Zapopan, and Tlajomulco, but lost Tlaquepaque and El Salto to the National Regeneration Movement (Morena). Morena and its allies secured victories in 45 municipalities, while the National Action Party (PAN), Institutional Revolutionary Party (PRI), and Party of the Democratic Revolution (PRD) collectively won 40 municipalities.

Party	Municipalities
Citizens' Movement	40
Institutional Revolutionary Party	21
National Regeneration Movement	20
National Action Party	15
Ecologist Green Party of Mexico	11
Hagamos	9
Party of the Democratic Revolution	4
Labor Party	4
Futuro	1
Total	125

== State of Mexico ==
=== 2024 Congress of the State of Mexico election ===
All 75 seats of the Congress of the State of Mexico were up for election, where 45 were elected through first-past-the-post voting and 30 through proportional representation. Deputies were elected to serve three-year terms in the LXII Legislature and took office on 5 September 2024.

Party	Seats			Change
Party	Constituency	Party-list	Total	Change
National Regeneration Movement	33	6	39	▲14
Institutional Revolutionary Party	2	7	9	▼13
Ecologist Green Party of Mexico	4	4	8	▲6
National Action Party	3	4	7	▼4
Labor Party	3	3	6	▲2
Citizens' Movement	0	4	4	▲2
Party of the Democratic Revolution	0	2	2	▼2
Total	33	33	66	

=== 2024 State of Mexico municipal elections ===
All positions of the State of Mexico's 125 municipalities were up for election. Elected officials began their three-year terms on 1 January 2025.

The National Regeneration Movement (Morena) and its allies collectively obtained 88 municipalities, up from 30 in 2021 and 55 in 2018, including the state's most populous municipalities—Toluca, Ecatepec, and Nezahualcóyotl. Morena flipped Toluca, the state capital, from the Institutional Revolutionary Party (PRI).

Party	Municipalities
National Regeneration Movement	59
Institutional Revolutionary Party	20
Ecologist Green Party of Mexico	19
Labor Party	10
Citizens' Movement	8
Party of the Democratic Revolution	4
National Action Party	3
New Alliance Party	2
Total	125

== Michoacán ==
=== 2024 Congress of Michoacán election ===
All 40 seats of the Congress of Michoacán were up for election, where 24 were elected through first-past-the-post voting and 16 through proportional representation. Deputies were elected to serve three-year terms in the LXXVI Legislature and took office on 15 September 2024.

Party	Seats			Change
Party	Constituency	Party-list	Total	Change
National Regeneration Movement	12	2	14	▲4
Ecologist Green Party of Mexico	5	2	7	▲5
Labor Party	4	2	6	▲1
National Action Party	1	3	4	▼4
Institutional Revolutionary Party	0	3	3	▼5
Independents	2	0	2	▲2
Citizens' Movement	0	2	2	▲1
Party of the Democratic Revolution	0	2	2	▼3
Total	24	16	40	

=== 2024 Michoacán municipal elections ===
All positions in 112 of Michoacán's 113 municipalities were up for election. The exception is Cherán, which operates outside the political party system and elects its authorities through "usos y costumbres" (lit. 'uses and customs'). Elected officials began their three-year terms on 1 September 2024.

The election in Irimbo was annulled due to a systematic campaign of gender-related violence targeting PRD candidate Azucena Ruiz Alanís, leveraging stereotypes and gender roles to undermine her candidacy. A special election was held on 8 December 2024.

Party	Municipalities
National Regeneration Movement	27
Institutional Revolutionary Party	16
National Action Party	15
Party of the Democratic Revolution	14
Labor Party	14
Citizens' Movement	10
Ecologist Green Party of Mexico	8
Solidarity Encounter Party	3
Más Michoacán	2
Tiempo por México	1
Independents	1
Total	111

== Morelos ==
=== 2024 Morelos gubernatorial election ===
Voters elected a new governor to serve a single six-year term through first-past-the-post voting, with the term beginning on 1 October 2024.

Margarita González Saravia, former general director of the National Lottery for Public Assistance under Andrés Manuel López Obrador, was nominated by Sigamos Haciendo Historia en Morelos, comprising the National Regeneration Movement (Morena), the Ecologist Green Party of Mexico (PVEM), the Labor Party (PT), and three local parties. Lucía Meza Guzmán, a senator from Morelos who was elected under Morena in 2018 but later switched to the Institutional Revolutionary Party (PRI), was nominated by Dignidad y Seguridad por Morelos, Vamos Todos, comprising the PRI, the National Action Party (PAN), the Party of the Democratic Revolution (PRD), and a local party. Jessica Ortega de la Cruz, a federal deputy for the fourth electoral region, was nominated by Movimiento Progresa, a coalition comprising Citizens' Movement (MC) and a local party.

Polling indicated that the gubernatorial race was primarily between Margarita González Saravia and Lucía Meza Guzmán, with both candidates maintaining a significant lead over Jessica Ortega de la Cruz. Most polls favored González Saravia as the frontrunner despite the unpopularity of incumbent governor Cuauhtémoc Blanco. However, several polls suggested a close contest, placing the leading candidates within the margin of error.

Margarita González Saravia won the election by approximately 17 points, becoming the first woman elected to the office. This election marked the first time she won an elected office.

Candidate	Party or alliance		Votes	%
Margarita González Saravia	Sigamos Haciendo Historia en Morelos	National Regeneration Movement	325,263	35.16
Margarita González Saravia	Sigamos Haciendo Historia en Morelos	Ecologist Green Party of Mexico	51,404	5.56
Margarita González Saravia	Sigamos Haciendo Historia en Morelos	Labor Party	47,439	5.13
Margarita González Saravia	Sigamos Haciendo Historia en Morelos	New Alliance Party	16,369	1.77
Margarita González Saravia	Sigamos Haciendo Historia en Morelos	Solidarity Encounter Party	10,705	1.16
Margarita González Saravia	Sigamos Haciendo Historia en Morelos	Movimiento Alternativa Social	9,091	0.98
Margarita González Saravia	Sigamos Haciendo Historia en Morelos	Total	460,271	49.76
Lucía Meza Guzmán	Dignidad y Seguridad por Morelos Vamos Todos	National Action Party	171,854	18.58
Lucía Meza Guzmán	Dignidad y Seguridad por Morelos Vamos Todos	Institutional Revolutionary Party	69,727	7.54
Lucía Meza Guzmán	Dignidad y Seguridad por Morelos Vamos Todos	Party of the Democratic Revolution	31,662	3.42
Lucía Meza Guzmán	Dignidad y Seguridad por Morelos Vamos Todos	Progressive Social Networks	21,049	2.28
Lucía Meza Guzmán	Dignidad y Seguridad por Morelos Vamos Todos	Total	294,292	31.82
Jessica Ortega de la Cruz	Movimiento Progresa	Citizens' Movement	134,870	14.58
Jessica Ortega de la Cruz	Movimiento Progresa	Morelos Progresa	35,052	3.79
Jessica Ortega de la Cruz	Movimiento Progresa	Total	169,922	18.37
Non-registered candidates			525	0.06
Total			925,010	100.00
Valid votes			925,010	97.21
Invalid/blank votes			26,575	2.79
Total votes			951,585	100.00
Registered voters/turnout			1,549,605	61.41
Source: IMPEPAC

=== 2024 Congress of Morelos election ===
All 20 seats of the Congress of Morelos were up for election, where 12 were elected through first-past-the-post voting and 8 through proportional representation. Deputies were elected to serve three-year terms in the LVI Legislature and took office on 1 September 2024.

Party	Seats			Change
Party	Constituency	Party-list	Total	Change
National Regeneration Movement	8	2	10	▲3
National Action Party	3	1	4	▼1
Labor Party	1	1	2	▲1
Citizens' Movement	0	1	1	▼1
Ecologist Green Party of Mexico	0	1	1	▲1
Institutional Revolutionary Party	0	1	1	▼1
New Alliance Party	0	1	1	Steady
Total	12	8	20	
Source: Radio Fórmula

=== 2024 Morelos municipal elections ===
All positions in 33 of Morelos's 36 municipalities were up for election. The three exceptions—Coatetelco, Hueyapan, and Xoxocotla—operate outside the political party system, electing their authorities through "usos y costumbres" (lit. 'uses and customs'). Elected officials began their three-year terms on 31 December 2024.

The National Action Party (PAN) retained control of Cuernavaca, the state capital, and successfully flipped key municipalities Cuautla, Jiutepec, and Temixco from the National Regeneration Movement (Morena).

Party	Municipalities
National Regeneration Movement	8
National Action Party	6
Ecologist Green Party of Mexico	5
Citizens' Movement	4
Labor Party	3
Independents	2
Institutional Revolutionary Party	1
New Alliance Party	1
Solidarity Encounter Party	1
Progressive Social Networks	1
Movimiento Alternativa Social	1
Total	33

== Nayarit ==
=== 2024 Congress of Nayarit election ===
All 30 seats of the Congress of Nayarit were up for election, where 18 were elected through first-past-the-post voting and 12 through proportional representation. Deputies were elected to serve three-year terms in the XXXIV Legislature and took office on 18 August 2024.

Party	Seats			Change
Party	Constituency	Party-list	Total	Change
National Regeneration Movement	12	1	13	▲1
Ecologist Green Party of Mexico	2	2	4	▲1
Labor Party	2	1	3	Steady
National Action Party	0	3	3	▲1
Force for Mexico	2	0	2	▲2
Institutional Revolutionary Party	0	2	2	▲1
Progressive Social Networks	0	1	1	Steady
New Alliance Party	0	1	1	▼2
Movimiento Levántate para Nayarit	0	1	1	▲1
Total	18	12	30	

=== 2024 Nayarit municipal elections ===
All positions of Nayarit's 20 municipalities were up for election. Elected officials began their three-year terms on 17 September 2024.

Party	Municipalities
National Regeneration Movement	14
National Action Party	1
Institutional Revolutionary Party	1
Labor Party	1
Ecologist Green Party of Mexico	1
Citizens' Movement	1
New Alliance Party	1
Total	20

== Nuevo León ==
=== 2024 Congress of Nuevo León election ===
All 42 seats of the Congress of Nuevo León were up for election, where 26 were elected through first-past-the-post voting and 16 through proportional representation. Deputies were elected to serve three-year terms in the LXXVII Legislature and took office on 31 August 2024.

The election resulted in a hung parliament. The largest bloc, comprising the National Action Party (PAN), the Institutional Revolutionary Party (PRI), and the Party of the Democratic Revolution (PRD), secured 21 seats—one short of a simple majority. The National Regeneration Movement (Morena) emerged as the party with the most individual gains, securing seven additional seats. For the first time in history, the Congress would consist of more women than men.

Party	Seats			Change
Party	Constituency	Party-list	Total	Change
National Action Party	7	3	10	▼6
Citizens' Movement	6	4	10	▲4
National Regeneration Movement	5	4	9	▲7
Institutional Revolutionary Party	5	3	8	▼6
Party of the Democratic Revolution	3	0	3	▲3
Ecologist Green Party of Mexico	0	1	1	▼1
Labor Party	0	1	1	▲1
Total	26	16	42	

=== 2024 Nuevo León municipal elections ===
All positions of Nuevo León's 51 municipalities were up for election. Elected officials began their three-year terms on 1 October 2024.

In the Monterrey metropolitan area, Citizens' Movement (MC), the ruling party, lost Monterrey, the capital, to the Institutional Revolutionary Party (PRI). However, it managed to flip Guadalupe and Juárez, two PRI strongholds, while also gaining Cadereyta Jiménez and Pesquería. The National Action Party (PAN) and the National Regeneration Movement (Morena) gained control of San Pedro Garza García and García, respectively; both municipalities had previously been governed by independents. Apodaca (PRI), General Escobedo (Morena), San Nicolás de los Garza (PAN), Santa Catarina (MC), and Santiago (PRI) remained under the control of their incumbent parties.

Party	Municipalities
Citizens' Movement	16
National Action Party	14
Institutional Revolutionary Party	9
National Regeneration Movement	4
Ecologist Green Party of Mexico	4
Labor Party	3
Partido Esperanza Social	1
Total	51

== Oaxaca ==
=== 2024 Congress of Oaxaca election ===
All 42 seats of the Congress of Oaxaca were up for election, where 25 were elected through first-past-the-post voting and 17 through proportional representation. Deputies were elected to serve three-year terms in the LXVI Legislature and took office on 15 November 2024.

Party	Seats			Change
Party	Constituency	Party-list	Total	Change
National Regeneration Movement	13	9	22	▼1
Ecologist Green Party of Mexico	6	1	7	▲6
Force for Mexico	6	0	6	▲6
Labor Party	0	3	3	Steady
Institutional Revolutionary Party	0	2	2	▼6
Citizens' Movement	0	1	1	▲1
National Action Party	0	1	1	▼1
Total	25	17	42	

=== 2024 Oaxaca municipal elections ===
All positions in 152 of Oaxaca's 570 municipalities were up for election. The remaining 418 municipalities operate outside the political party system and elect their authorities through "usos y costumbres" (lit. 'uses and customs'), with San Baltazar Chichicapam being the most recent municipality to switch to the system. Elected officials began their three-year terms on 1 January 2025.

Party	Municipalities
National Regeneration Movement	68
Labor Party	19
Ecologist Green Party of Mexico	14
Institutional Revolutionary Party	10
Force for Mexico	9
Citizens' Movement	8
New Alliance Party	8
National Action Party	5
Partido Unidad Popular	4
Party of the Democratic Revolution	4
Independents	2
Partido Mujer	1
Total	152

== Puebla ==
All 41 seats of the Congress of Puebla were up for election, where 26 were elected through first-past-the-post voting and 15 through proportional representation. Additionally, the governorship and all positions of the state's 217 municipalities were up for election.

2024 Congress of Puebla election
Party	Seats			Change
Party	Constituency	Party-list	Total	Change
National Regeneration Movement	11	4	15	▼1
National Action Party	0	7	7	▼2
Ecologist Green Party of Mexico	6	0	6	▲5
Labor Party	5	0	5	Steady
New Alliance Party	2	0	2	▲1
Force for Mexico	2	0	2	▲2
Citizens' Movement	0	2	2	▲1
Institutional Revolutionary Party	0	2	2	▼4
Total	26	15	41	

== Querétaro ==
All 25 seats of the Legislature of Querétaro were up for election, where 15 were elected through first-past-the-post voting and 10 through proportional representation. Additionally, all positions of the state's 18 municipalities were up for election.

2024 Legislature of Querétaro election
Party	Seats			Change
Party	Constituency	Party-list	Total	Change
National Regeneration Movement	6	3	9	▲4
National Action Party	5	3	8	▼5
Ecologist Green Party of Mexico	2	1	3	▲2
Institutional Revolutionary Party	0	2	2	▼1
Labor Party	2	0	2	▲2
Citizens' Movement	0	1	1	▲1
Total	15	10	25	

== Quintana Roo ==
All 25 seats of the Congress of Quintana Roo were up for election, where 15 were elected through first-past-the-post voting and 10 through proportional representation. All positions of the state's 11 municipalities were up for election.

2024 Congress of Quintana Roo election
Party	Seats			Change
Party	Constituency	Party-list	Total	Change
National Regeneration Movement	9	4	13	▲3
Ecologist Green Party of Mexico	3	2	5	▼2
Labor Party	3	0	3	Steady
National Action Party	0	2	2	▲1
Citizens' Movement	0	1	1	Steady
Institutional Revolutionary Party	0	1	1	Steady
Total	15	10	25	

== San Luis Potosí ==
All 27 seats of the Congress of San Luis Potosí were up for election, where 15 were elected through first-past-the-post voting and 12 through proportional representation. Additionally, all positions of the state's 58 municipalities were up for election.

2024 Congress of San Luis Potosí election
Party	Seats			Change
Party	Constituency	Party-list	Total	Change
Ecologist Green Party of Mexico	6	3	9	▲3
National Regeneration Movement	3	3	6	▲2
Labor Party	4	0	4	▲1
National Action Party	2	2	4	▼2
Institutional Revolutionary Party	0	2	2	▼2
Citizens' Movement	0	1	1	Steady
New Alliance Party	0	1	1	Steady
Total	15	12	27	

== Sinaloa ==
All 40 seats in the Congress of Sinaloa were up for election, where 24 were elected through first-past-the-post voting and 16 through proportional representation. Additionally, all positions of the state's 20 municipalities were up for election.

2024 Congress of Sinaloa election
Party	Seats			Change
Party	Constituency	Party-list	Total	Change
National Regeneration Movement	18	3	21	▲1
Ecologist Green Party of Mexico	6	0	6	▲6
Institutional Revolutionary Party	0	4	4	▼4
National Action Party	0	4	4	▲2
Citizens' Movement	0	2	2	▲1
Partido Sinaloense	0	2	2	▼6
Labor Party	0	1	1	Steady
Total	24	16	40	

== Sonora ==
All 33 seats of the Congress of Sonora were up for election, where 21 were elected through first-past-the-post voting and 12 through proportional representation. Additionally, all positions of the state's 72 municipalities were up for election.

2024 Congress of Sonora election
Party	Seats			Change
Party	Constituency	Party-list	Total	Change
National Regeneration Movement	7	1	8	▼6
Labor Party	4	1	5	▲2
Ecologist Green Party of Mexico	3	1	4	▲2
New Alliance Party	3	1	4	▲2
Solidarity Encounter Party	3	1	4	▲3
National Action Party	1	1	2	▼2
Institutional Revolutionary Party	0	2	2	▼2
Citizens' Movement	0	2	2	Steady
Party of the Democratic Revolution	0	1	1	Steady
Partido Sonorense	0	1	1	▲1
Total	21	12	33	

== Tabasco ==
All 35 seats of the Congress of Tabasco were up for election, where 21 were elected through first-past-the-post voting and 14 through proportional representation. Additionally, the governorship and all positions of the state's 17 municipalities were up for election.

2024 Congress of Tabasco election
Party	Seats			Change
Party	Constituency	Party-list	Total	Change
National Regeneration Movement	21	0	21	Steady
Party of the Democratic Revolution	0	4	4	▼2
Citizens' Movement	0	3	3	▲2
Ecologist Green Party of Mexico	0	3	3	▲2
Labor Party	0	3	3	▲3
Institutional Revolutionary Party	0	1	1	▼3
Total	21	14	35	

== Tamaulipas ==
All 36 seats of the Congress of Tamaulipas were up for election, where 22 were elected through first-past-the-post voting and 14 through proportional representation. Additionally, all positions of the state's 43 municipalities were up for election.

2024 Congress of Tamaulipas election
Party	Seats			Change
Party	Constituency	Party-list	Total	Change
National Regeneration Movement	13	5	18	Steady
National Action Party	1	6	7	▼6
Ecologist Green Party of Mexico	4	0	4	▲4
Labor Party	4	0	4	▲2
Citizens' Movement	0	2	2	▲1
Institutional Revolutionary Party	0	1	1	▼1
Total	22	14	36	

== Tlaxcala ==
All 25 seats of the Congress of Tlaxcala were up for election, where 15 were elected through first-past-the-post voting and 10 through proportional representation. Additionally, all positions of the state's 60 municipalities were up for election.

2024 Congress of Tlaxcala election
Party	Seats			Change
Party	Constituency	Party-list	Total	Change
National Regeneration Movement	15	0	15	▲7
Labor Party	0	2	2	▼2
Citizens' Movement	0	1	1	▲1
Partido Alianza Ciudadana	0	1	1	Steady
Ecologist Green Party of Mexico	0	1	1	▼1
Institutional Revolutionary Party	0	1	1	▼2
National Action Party	0	1	1	Steady
Party of the Democratic Revolution	0	1	1	▼1
Force for Mexico	0	1	1	Steady
New Alliance Party	0	1	1	▼1
Total	15	10	25	

== Veracruz ==
All 50 seats of the Congress of Veracruz were up for election, where 30 were elected through first-past-the-post voting and 20 through proportional representation. Additionally, the governorship is up for election.

== Yucatán ==
All 25 seats of the Congress of Yucatán were up for election, where 15 were elected through first-past-the-post voting and 10 through proportional representation. Additionally, the governorship and all positions of the state's 106 municipalities were up for election.

2024 Congress of Yucatán election
Party	Seats			Change
Party	Constituency	Party-list	Total	Change
National Regeneration Movement	14	0	14	▲10
National Action Party	4	6	10	▼4
Labor Party	2	2	4	▲4
Ecologist Green Party of Mexico	1	2	3	▲2
Institutional Revolutionary Party	0	2	2	▼2
Citizens' Movement	0	2	2	▲1
Total	21	14	35	

== Zacatecas ==
All 30 seats of the Congress of Zacatecas were up for election, where 18 were elected through first-past-the-post voting and 12 through proportional representation. Additionally, all positions of the state's 58 municipalities were up for election.

2024 Congress of Zacatecas election
Party	Seats			Change
Party	Constituency	Party-list	Total	Change
National Regeneration Movement	11	1	12	Steady
Institutional Revolutionary Party	2	3	5	▼2
National Action Party	2	1	3	Steady
Labor Party	0	3	3	Steady
Ecologist Green Party of Mexico	2	0	2	▲1
Party of the Democratic Revolution	1	1	2	Steady
Citizens' Movement	0	2	2	▲2
New Alliance Party	0	1	1	Steady
Total	18	12	30	

== See also ==
- 2024 Mexican general election
- List of political parties in Mexico
- List of elections in 2024
