= List of current state governors in Mexico =

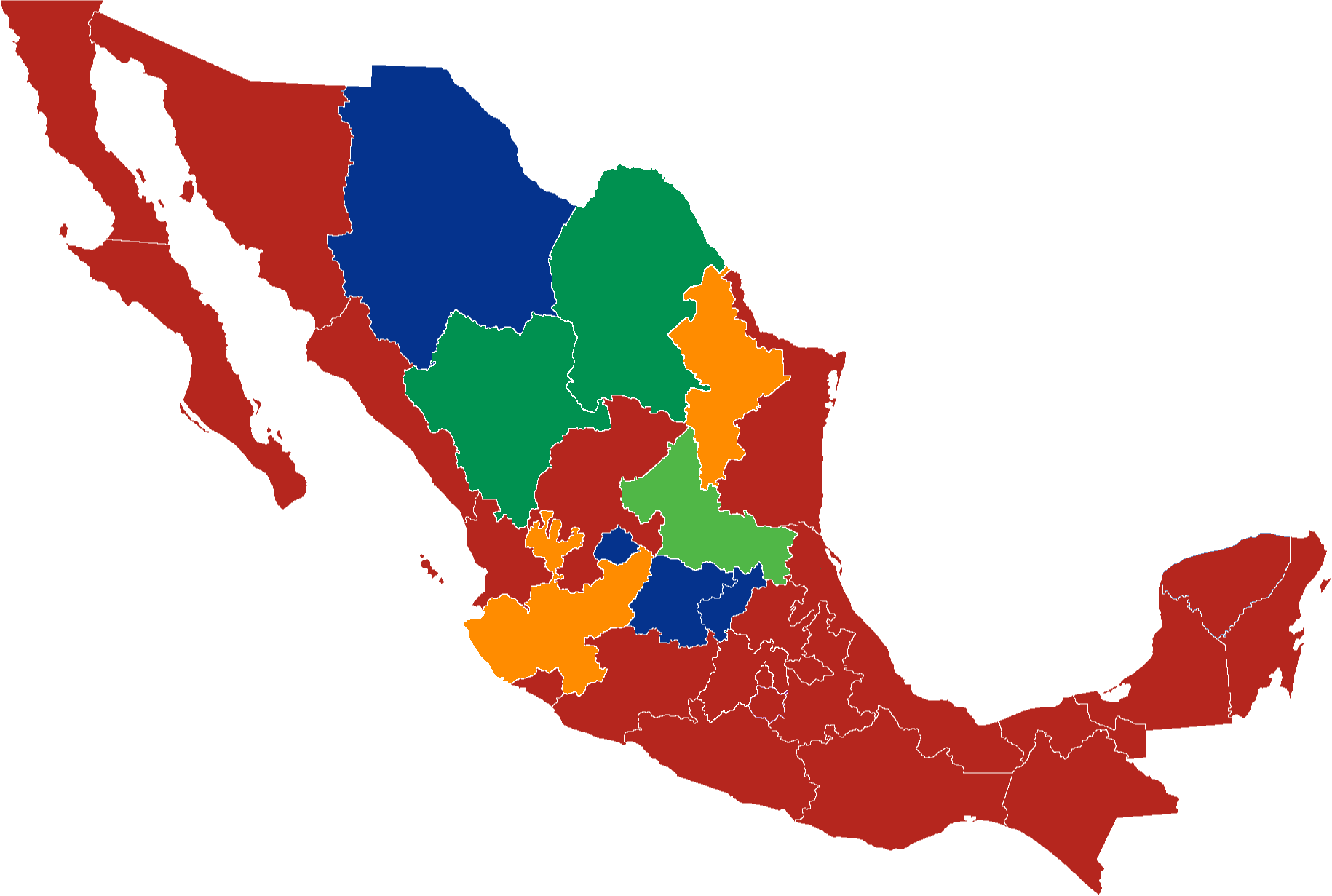
States governed by party, September 2026 Morena PAN PRI MC PVEM PAZ Somos MX

The United Mexican States, commonly known as Mexico, is a federation comprising thirty-two federal entities. The Head of Government of Mexico City is not considered a governorship, but the position has the rank of a governorship and is included on this list of governors for completeness. Article 115 of the current Federal Constitution states that, for their internal government, the states shall adopt the republican, representative, democratic, secular, and popular form of government, with the free municipality as the basis of their territorial division and political and administrative organization. The election of governors of the states and the local legislatures shall be direct and in the manner prescribed by their respective electoral laws.

State governors serve six-year terms. Like the President of Mexico, they are barred from seeking reelection; no one who has previously held a governorship may run for or serve in the post again, even on a caretaker basis. Candidates for governor must be Mexican citizens by birth and either a state native or a state resident for at least five years before election day, per Article 116 Part I of the constitution.

Including the Head of Government of Mexico City, 23 governorships are held by the National Regeneration Movement (Morena). Four governors are members of the National Action Party, two are members of the Institutional Revolutionary Party, two are members of the Citizens' Movement, and one is from the Ecologist Green Party of Mexico.

== State governors ==
Morena (23) PAN (4) PRI (2) MC (2) PVEM (1) PAZ (0) Somos MX (0)
State	Governor	Party	Prior Public Experience	Took office	End of Term	Past
Aguascalientes	María Teresa Jiménez Esquivel		Chamber of Deputies	1 October 2022	30 September 2027	List
Baja California	Marina del Pilar Ávila Olmeda	National Regeneration Movement	Chamber of Deputies, Municipal president of Mexicali	1 November 2021	31 October 2027	List
Baja California Sur	Víctor Manuel Castro Cosío	National Regeneration Movement	Chamber of Deputies, Senate of the Republic, Delegate of Social Development of Baja California Sur, Secretary of Education of Baja California Sur, Municipal president of La Paz	10 September 2021	9 September 2027	List
Campeche	Layda Elena Sansores	National Regeneration Movement	Chamber of Deputies, Senate of the Republic, Mayor of Álvaro Obregón	15 September 2021	14 September 2027	List
Chiapas	Eduardo Ramírez Aguilar	National Regeneration Movement	President of the Senate of the Republic	8 December 2024	7 December 2030	List
Chihuahua	María Eugenia Campos Galván		Chamber of Deputies, Municipal president of Chihuahua	8 September 2021	7 September 2027	List
Mexico City	Clara Brugada	National Regeneration Movement	Mayor of Iztapalapa, Chamber of Deputies	5 October 2024	4 October 2030	List
Coahuila	Manolo Jiménez Salinas	Institutional Revolutionary Party	Municipal president of Saltillo	1 December 2023	30 November 2029	List
Colima	Indira Vizcaíno Silva	National Regeneration Movement	Chamber of Deputies, Delegate of Social Development of Colima, Secretary of Social Development of Coima, Municipal president of Cuauhtémoc	1 November 2021	31 October 2027	List
Durango	Esteban Villegas Villarreal	Institutional Revolutionary Party	Chamber of Deputies, Municipal president of Durango	15 September 2022	14 September 2028	List
Guanajuato	Libia García Muñoz Ledo		Chamber of Deputies, Secretary of the Government of Guanajuato, Secretary of Social and Human Development of Guanajuato	26 September 2024	25 September 2030	List
Guerrero	Evelyn Salgado Pineda	National Regeneration Movement	President of the National System for Integral Family Development of Acapulco	15 October 2021	14 October 2027	List
Hidalgo	Julio Menchaca	National Regeneration Movement	Chamber of Deputies, Senate of the Republic	5 September 2022	4 September 2028	List
Jalisco	Pablo Lemus Navarro	Citizens' Movement (Mexico)	Municipal president of Guadalajara, Municipal president of Zapopan	6 December 2024	5 December 2030	List
State of Mexico	Delfina Gómez Álvarez	National Regeneration Movement	Secretariat of Education, Municipal president of Texcoco de Mora	16 September 2023	15 September 2029	List
Michoacán	Alfredo Ramírez Bedolla	National Regeneration Movement	Chamber of Deputies	1 October 2021	30 September 2027	List
Morelos	Margarita González Saravia	National Regeneration Movement	Director general of the National Lottery, Secretary of Tourism and Culture of Morelos	1 October 2024	30 September 2030	List
Nayarit	Miguel Ángel Navarro Quintero	National Regeneration Movement	Chamber of Deputies, Senate of the Republic	19 September 2021	18 September 2027	List
Nuevo León	Samuel García	Citizens' Movement (Mexico)	Chamber of Deputies, Senate of the Republic	4 December 2023	3 October 2027	List
Oaxaca	Salomón Jara Cruz	National Regeneration Movement	Chamber of Deputies	1 December 2022	30 November 2028	List
Puebla	Alejandro Armenta Mier	National Regeneration Movement	President of the Senate of the Republic	14 December 2024	13 December 2030	List
Querétaro	Mauricio Kuri González		Senate of the Republic, Municipal president of Corregidora	1 October 2021	30 September 2027	List
Quintana Roo	Mara Lezama Espinosa	National Regeneration Movement	Municipal president of Benito Juárez	25 September 2022	24 September 2027	List
San Luis Potosí	Ricardo Gallardo Cardona	Ecologist Green Party of Mexico	Chamber of Deputies, Municipal president of Soledad de Graciano Sánchez	26 September 2021	25 September 2027	List
Sinaloa	Graciela Domínguez Nava (interim) (Note: Rubén Rocha Moya, who has a mandate until 31 October 2027, left his office on 23 August 2026.)	National Regeneration Movement	Chamber of Deputies	25 August 2026	31 October 2027	List
Sonora	Alfonso Durazo Montaño	National Regeneration Movement	Chamber of Deputies, Senate of the Republic, Secretary of Security and Civilian Protection	13 September 2021	12 September 2027	List
Tabasco	Javier May Rodríguez	National Regeneration Movement	Municipal president of Comalcalco, Chamber of Deputies, Senate of the Republic, Director of FONATUR	1 October 2024	30 September 2030	List
Tamaulipas	Américo Villarreal Anaya	National Regeneration Movement	Senate of the Republic	1 October 2022	30 September 2028	List
Tlaxcala	Lorena Cuéllar Cisneros	National Regeneration Movement	Chamber of Deputies, Senate of the Republic, Delegate of Social Development of Tlaxcala, Secretary of Tourism of Tlaxcala, Municipal president of Tlaxcala	31 August 2021	30 August 2027	List
Veracruz	Rocío Nahle García	National Regeneration Movement	Chamber of Deputies, Secretary of Energy	1 December 2024	30 November 2030	List
Yucatán	Joaquín Díaz Mena	National Regeneration Movement	Delegate of Development Programs, Chamber of Deputies, Municipal president of San Felipe	1 October 2024	30 September 2030	List
Zacatecas	David Monreal Ávila	National Regeneration Movement	Senate of the Republic, General Coordinator of Cattle Raising of the Secretariat of Agriculture and Rural Development, Municipal president of Fresnillo	12 September 2021	11 September 2027	List

== See also ==
- List of Mexican state congresses
- National Governors Conference (Mexico)
