= Governor Ramírez =

Governor Ramírez may refer to:

== Argentina ==
- Francisco Ramírez (governor) (1786–1821), governor of Entre Ríos

== Mexico ==
- Alfredo Ramírez Bedolla (born 1976), governor of Michoacán
- Carlos Ramírez Guerrero, governor of Hidalgo
- Eduardo Ramírez Aguilar (born 1973), governor of Chiapas
- Enrique Ramírez Aviña, governor of Michoacán
- Francisco Ramírez Acuña (born 1952), governor of Jalisco
- Francisco Ramírez Luque (1886–1924), governor of Querétaro
- Graco Ramírez (born 1949), governor of Morelos
- Heladio Ramírez (born 1939), governor of Oaxaca
- José Ramírez Gamero (1938–2022), governor of Durango
- Juan José Ramírez, governor of Chiapas
- Juan Manuel Ramírez, governor of Tamaulipas
- José María Ramírez (politician), governor of Chiapas
- Leonel Ramírez García (died 2003), governor of Colima
- Luis Ramírez Corzo, governor of Chiapas
- Margarito Ramírez Miranda (1891–1979), governor of Jalisco, governor of Quintana Roo as a federal territory
