= Olga Luz Espinosa =

Mexican politician

- Born: 9 June 1976 (age 49); Mapastepec, Chiapas, Mexico
- Occupation: Politician
- Political party: PRD

Olga Luz Espinosa Morales (born 9 June 1976) is a Mexican politician from the Party of the Democratic Revolution (PRD). She was born in Mapastepec, Chiapas, and is a law graduate.

From 2009 to 2012 she served as a plurinominal deputy in the 61st Congress, representing the third electoral region, which includes her home state of Chiapas. She was re-elected to a plurinominal seat in Congress in 2021. She has also served in the Congress of Chiapas.

Espinosa Morales contended for the governorship of Chiapas in the 2 June 2024 local election, representing the Fuerza y Corazón por México coalition. She finished in second place with 12% of the vote, behind Óscar Eduardo Ramírez Aguilar of the Sigamos Haciendo Historia coalition.
