= Yulma Rocha Aguilar =

Mexican politician (born 1981)

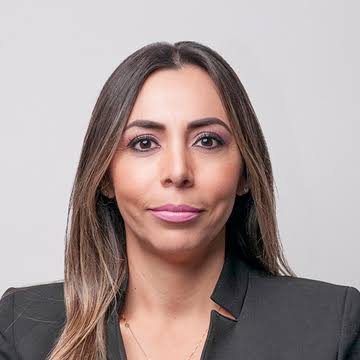
- Born: 7 September 1981 (age 44); Guanajuato, Mexico
- Occupation: Politician
- Political party: PRI, MC

Yulma Rocha Aguilar (born 7 September 1981) is a Mexican politician. She has been affiliated with both the Institutional Revolutionary Party (PRI) and, more recently, the Citizens' Movement (MC). In the 2015 mid-terms, she was elected to the Chamber of Deputies for the PRI to represent Guanajuato's 9th district during the 63rd session of Congress.

== Life and career ==
After receiving a degree in public administration from the Universidad de Guanajuato, Rocha broke into politics at a young age: from 2003 to 2006, she served on the city council of Irapuato, and in 2003, she also served as a PRI national political councilor. In 2006, she became a local deputy for the first time, serving a three-year term in the LX Legislature of the Congress of Guanajuato.

Rocha was selected by the PRI as a proportional representation deputy to serve in the 61st Congress. Rocha served as secretary on the Science and Technology Commission and additionally sat on the Commission for the Strengthening of Federalism. She also was one of just nine PRI deputies that did not vote down a constitutional reform that would have restricted abortions. However, just two days into her term, Rocha asked to leave her seat and was replaced with Guillermo Raúl Ruiz de Teresa. Rocha, along with seven other deputies, became known as the "juanitas" because all of their alternate deputies—who would replace them—were men, which represented a misuse of gender quotas whereby women would be elected and then replaced with men. The result of the "juanitas" was that in 2012, the TEPJF required that all combinations of primary and alternate officials be of the same gender, in order to maintain gender quotas. From 2010 to 2014, Rocha served as general secretary of the Guanajuato state PRI, and from 2012 to 2015, she served in the 62nd session of the Congress of Guanajuato and presided over its Education Commission.

When Rocha announced she would run to return to the Chamber of Deputies for the 63rd Congress, she was criticized by Sixto Zetina, then the mayor of Irapuato, who told Rocha on Twitter that "you denigrated women because you knew that you would only be a deputy because of your gender, but you were obligated to leave your seat to a man". Additionally, her departure from the Guanajuato state congress, undertaken in order to conduct her campaign to return to the Palacio Legislativo de San Lázaro, left a vacant seat, as the alternate deputy refused to take the oath of office and multiple attempts to contact her did not meet with success. Voters ultimately sent Rocha back to San Lázaro, where she served on the Constitutional Points, Public Education and Educational Services, Jurisdictional, and Transparency and Anticorruption Commissions.

Rocha Aguilar resigned from the PRI in November 2023 and contended unsuccessfully for the governorship of Guanajuato in the 2 June 2024 election, representing the Citizens' Movement (MC).
