= Alma Alcaraz =

Mexican politician

Alma Edwviges Alcaraz Hernández
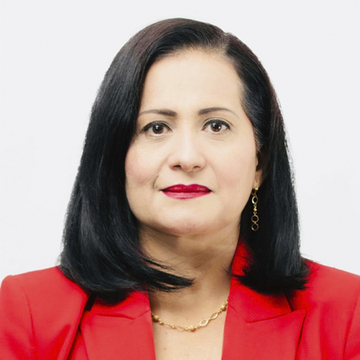
- Born: 17 October 1971 (age 54); La Barca, Jalisco, Mexico
- Occupation: Politician
- Political party: MORENA

Alma Edwviges Alcaraz Hernández (Note: In this Mexican name, the surname is Alcaraz and the second or maternal family name is Hernández.) (born 17 October 1971) is a Mexican politician from the National Regeneration Movement (Morena). She was born in La Barca, Jalisco, but grew up in the state of Sinaloa.

From 2006 to 2009, she served as a federal deputy in the 60th Congress, representing the first electoral region (which includes Sinaloa) for the National Action Party (PAN).

On 27 September 2018, Alcaraz was named the state director of MORENA in Guanajuato.

Alcaraz Hernández contended for the governorship of Guanajuato in the 2 June 2024 election, representing the Morena-led Sigamos Haciendo Historia coalition.
