= Gisela Gaytán =

Mexican lawyer and politician (1986–2024)

Personal details
- Born: Bertha Gisela Gaytán Gutiérrez; 6 April 1986 Celaya, Guanajuato, Mexico
- Died: 1 April 2024 (aged 37)
- Party: Morena
- Education: UNAM (lawyer)

Bertha Gisela Gaytán Gutiérrez (6 April 1986 – 1 April 2024) was a Mexican lawyer and politician aligned with the Morena party. She was a candidate for municipal president of her hometown of Celaya, before being murdered on 1 April 2024.

== Biography ==
Gaytán was born in Celaya, Guanajuato, Mexico on 6 April 1986. As she grew up in a traditional family in the Benito Juárez neighborhood, she stood out early for her service. Gaytán graduated in law from Lasallista Benavente University with a master's degree in Administrative Justice. She worked both in a personal office and in the Municipal Comptroller's Office.

=== Career ===
After graduation, Gaytán became a trial attorney. She was encouraged to enter politics in 2016, initially joining the Institutional Revolutionary Party (PRI). In 2018 she joined Morena. She additionally served as vice president of the Board of Directors of the National Youth Council of the Mexican Youth Institute (IMJUVE), and as state advisor of the party in Celaya.

In February 2024, she was chosen as Morena's candidate for mayor of Celaya after winning against two male candidates. She was the only female candidate in Celaya's 2024 mayoral race. In running for municipal president, Gaytán outlined a platform to fight crime, stop corruption and tackle violence in the community.

== Assassination ==
Assassination of Bertha Gisela Gaytán
- Part of 2024 Mexican local elections 2024 Mexican general election
- Location: Main garden square of San Miguel Octopan, on Benito Juárez Street and the corner of Independencia, Celaya
- Date: April 1, 2024
- Target: Bertha Gisela Gaytán, electoral disruption
- Attack type: Assassination, shooting
- Weapon: Firearm
- Deaths: 1
- Injuries: 3
- Victims: Bertha Gisela Gaytán (killed), Adrián Guerrero and two others injured
- Motive: Drug cartel violence

On 1 April 2024, at the age of 37, Gaytán was shot and killed in the streets of San Miguel Octopan at her first campaign rally for municipal president of Celaya. Her assassination occurred shortly before 6:00 p.m. as she was surrounded by supporters. She was shot in the middle of the street, as she walked to greet members of the community. As seen in videos published on social media, supporters were chanting "Morena, Morena" before being interrupted by several gunshots.

Three people were also injured in the shooting. One of them, Adrián Guerrero Caracheo, a candidate for regidor (city councillor), was also declared dead by the authorities following the attack, but it was later confirmed that he had gone into hiding out of a fear for his life.

Prior to Gaytán's assassination, she had requested police protection due to threats and intimidation. By the time of her campaign start, she had not received such protection. At the time of her death, the state of Guanajuato was reported to have the highest number of homicides of any state in Mexico. Within Guanajuato, Celaya was considered one of the most dangerous towns, where 34 police officers had been killed in the last three years.

The 2024 election cycle would be the most violent in Mexico's history.

=== Reactions ===
Alma Alcaraz, the Morena party's candidate for governor in Guanajuato was the first to respond after news of the assassination broke.

“I am angry, I am short of breath, I am shocked to have to give you such terrible news; a few minutes ago, our candidate from Celaya for Morena, Gisela Gaytán, was murdered. This is something that has us shocked and in mourning.”

Subsequently, National Action Party (PAN) member Libia Dennise García Muñoz Ledo, condemned the crime and sent her condolences to the family, friends, and colleagues of Gaytán.

At a press conference on 2 April, President Andrés Manuel López Obrador sent his condolences to family, friends and colleagues. The Secretariat of Security and Civilian Protection, Rosa Icela Rodríguez, assured that the federal government had measured in place to protect political candidates from violence.

After Gaytán's murder, the Security Ministry offered police protection to 487 candidates running for office.

One month after the murder, Alma Alcaraz shared her frustration that no one has been arrested for the crime.

== See also ==
- List of politicians killed during the 2024 Mexican elections
