= Diego Sinhué Rodríguez Vallejo =

Mexican politician (born 1980)

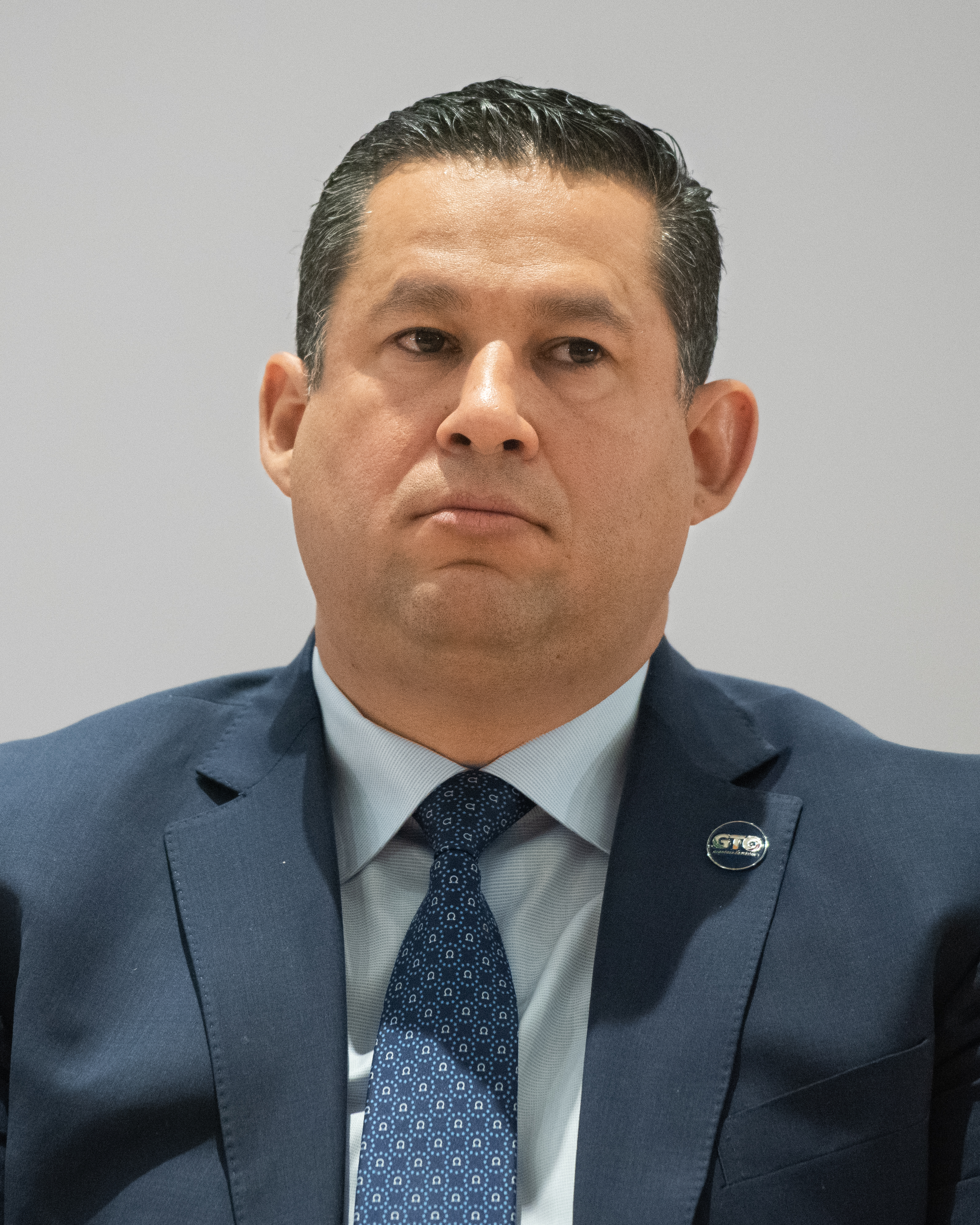
- Rodríguez in 2022

Governor of Guanajuato
- In office 26 September 2018 – 25 September 2024
- Preceded by: Miguel Márquez Márquez
- Succeeded by: Libia García Muñoz Ledo

Member of the Congress of the Union for Guanajuato's 5th electoral district
- In office 1 September 2012 – 12 February 2015
- Preceded by: Lucila del Carmen Gallegos Camarena
- Succeeded by: Viridiana Lizette Espino Cano

Personal details
- Born: 15 November 1980 (age 45) León, Guanajuato, Mexico
- Party: National Action Party
- Education: La Salle University (LLB)
- Occupation: Lawyer

Diego Sinhué Rodríguez Vallejo (born 15 November 1980) is a Mexican politician affiliated with the National Action Party (PAN) who served as the governor of Guanajuato from 2018 to 2024. He previously represented his state as a federal deputy in the 62nd Congress (2012–2015).

== Life ==
Diego Sinhué Rodríguez was born in León, Guanajuato, and received his law degree from the Universidad De La Salle Bajío in that city in 2003. He became a PAN member in 2005, sitting on its municipal youth committee and becoming the head of training in the state's third local district. In 2006, he was elected as a regidor on León's city council, and in 2010, he was elected to the Congress of Guanajuato, where he served two years and presided over the Urban Development and Public Works Commission.

In 2012, voters in Guanajuato's fifth federal electoral district, which includes portions of León, sent Rodríguez to the Chamber of Deputies for the 62nd Congress. He was a secretary on the Budget and Public Account Commission and also sat on those dealing with Foreign Relations and Housing; during this time, he obtained a master's degree in public administration from the Universidad de Guanajuato. On 17 February 2015, Rodríguez permanently took leave from the Chamber of Deputies and was tapped by Governor Miguel Márquez Márquez to become the Guanajuato state secretary of social and human development. He left the post on 31 July 2017, announcing his intention to contend for the PAN nomination for governor of Guanajuato.

In the 2018 Guanajuato gubernatorial campaign, Rodríguez was nominated by the Por Guanajuato al Frente coalition, consisting of the PAN, PRD and Movimiento Ciudadano; he was the only PAN candidate. Exit polls on election night showed him with a double-digit lead over Ricardo Sheffield, who ran as the Juntos Haremos Historia candidate.
