= Libia Denisse García =

Mexican politician (born 1983)

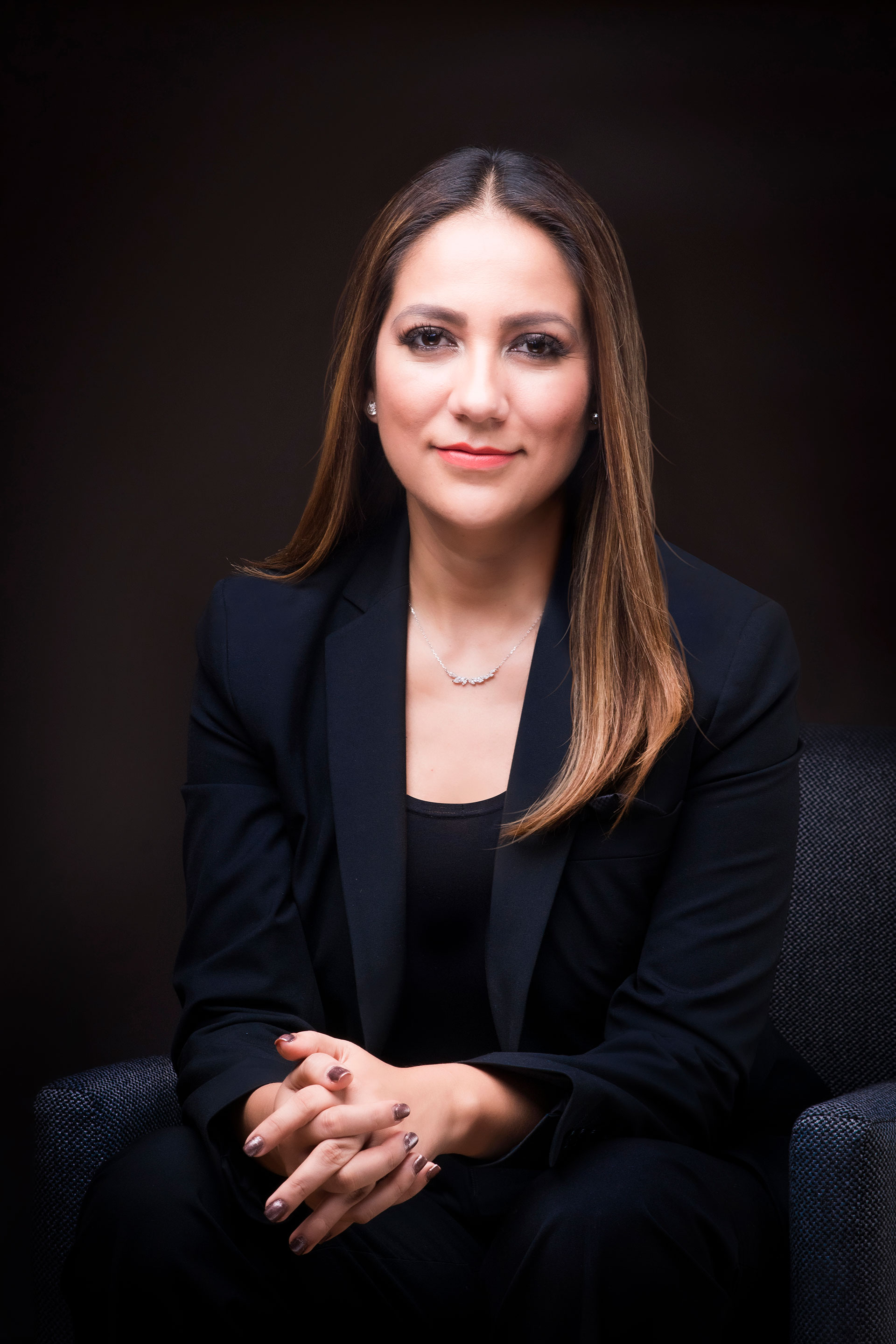

Governor of Guanajuato
- Incumbent
- Assumed office 26 September 2024
- Preceded by: Diego Sinhué Rodríguez Vallejo

Personal details
- Born: Libia Denisse García Muñoz Ledo; 15 June 1983 (age 43) León, Guanajuato, Mexico
- Party: National Action Party
- Education: Universidad La Salle
- Profession: Lawyer

Libia Dennise García Muñoz Ledo (born 15 June 1983) is a Mexican lawyer, writer and politician. Currently serving as the governor of Guanajuato after winning the 2024 election, she is the first woman to govern the state. She is a member of the National Action Party (PAN).

On 10 April 2023, she was appointed secretary of social and human development for the state of Guanajuato. She was secretary of government of the state of Guanajuato during the years 2021 to 2023. She has also served two terms as a local deputy in the Congress of Guanajuato, from 2015 to 2018 and from 2018 to 2021.

== Biography ==
Libia Dennise García Muñoz Ledo was born in León, Guanajuato, in 1983. She has a law degree from Universidad De La Salle Bajío and a master's degree in constitutional and administrative law. In private practice, she has worked as a litigation attorney in civil and commercial matters.

She was part of the National Training Program for Democratic Leaders and Political Management, by the Organization of American States (OAS) in conjunction with the University of Guanajuato; the Seminar "Effective Legislation and Strategic Political Communication", by The Washington Center; and the Seminar in Public Management, by the Universidad Camilo José Cela de Madrid, Spain.

Her work experience includes being an advisor to the Parliamentary Group of the National Action Party in the 62nd session of the Congress of Guanajuato from 2012 to 2015, as well as legal advisor in the Directorate of Governmental Liaison of the Undersecretary of Liaison and Political Coordination of the State Government.

== Political career ==
She began her activism in the National Action Party (PAN) in 2004. During her youth, she was part of Acción Juvenil.

Within the State Directive Committee and the Municipal Directive Committee of León, Guanajuato, she has held the positions of state advisor, secretary of Internal Strengthening of the State Directive Committee of the National Action Party in León, PAN representative before the electoral bodies and trainer endorsed by the National System of Trainers of the National Action Party (SCAN).

She was a local deputy in the Congress of Guanajuato for the 5th local district on two consecutive occasions, during the 63rd and 64th sessions, making her the first woman re-elected in Guanajuato. As a local deputy, she promoted the proposal for the creation of the State Program for the Protection of Breastfeeding and the approval of the Olimpia Law.

In 2021, she was appointed by Governor Diego Sinhué Rodríguez Vallejo as the secretary of government, making her the first woman in the history of the state of Guanajuato to hold that position.

After 10 April 2023, she served as secretary of social and human development of the state of Guanajuato.

On 16 August 2023, the national leadership of the PAN installed a political roundtable to define the (female) candidate for governor of Guanajuato for the 2024 elections. Libia Dennise was officially recognized by the PAN as one of the two candidates for the Governorship of the State. She fought and won the gubernatorial election held on 2 June 2024. She was sworn in on 26 September 2024 for a six-year term.
