= Miguel Márquez Márquez =

Mexican politician (born 1968)

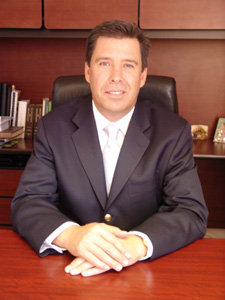
- Márquez in 2010

Governor of Guanajuato
- In office 26 September 2012 – 25 September 2018
- Preceded by: Héctor López Santillana (interim)
- Succeeded by: Diego Sinhué Rodríguez Vallejo

Personal details
- Born: 11 November 1968 (age 57) Purísima del Rincón, Guanajuato, Mexico
- Party: National Action Party
- Spouse: María Eugenia Carreño
- Children: Eugeia Márquez Carreño, Miguel Márquez Carreño

Miguel Márquez Márquez (born 11 November 1968) is a Mexican politician affiliated with the National Action Party (PAN). He served as governor of Guanajuato from 2012 to 2018. Prior to his governorship, Márquez was mayor (municipal president) of his hometown of Purísima del Rincón, Guanajuato, in 2001–2003.

Márquez Márquez won election as one of Guanajuato's senators in the 2024 Senate election, occupying the first place on the National Action Party's two-name formula.

Political offices
| Preceded by Héctor López Santillana | Governor of Guanajuato; 2012–2018 | Succeeded by Diego Sinhué Rodríguez Vallejo |
