= Clara Brugada =

Mexican politician

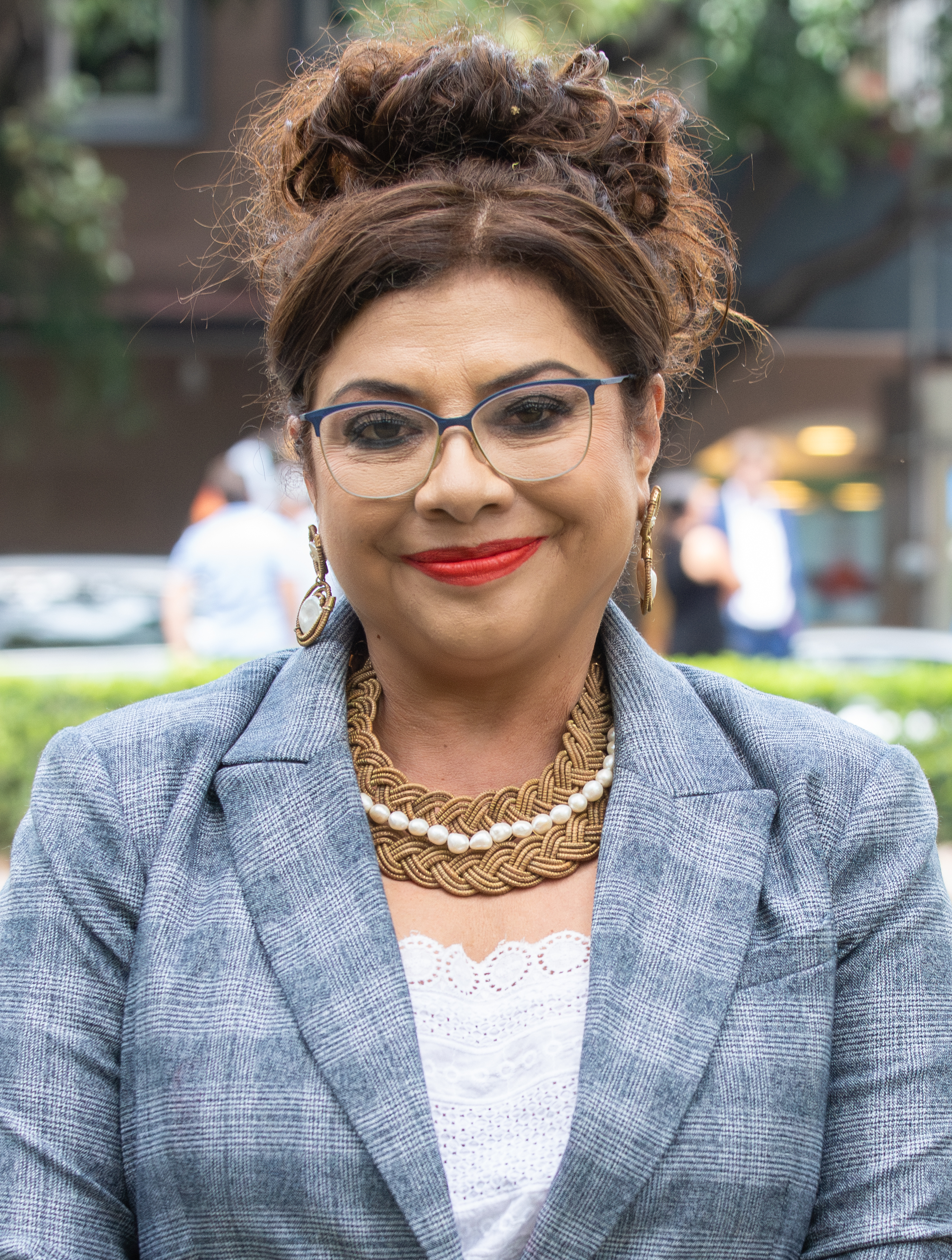
- Clara Brugada in 2023

Head of Government of Mexico City
- Incumbent
- Assumed office 5 October 2024
- Preceded by: Martí Batres

Mayor of Iztapalapa
- In office 1 October 2018 – 16 September 2023
- Preceded by: Dione Anguiano Flores
- Succeeded by: Raúl Basulto Luviano

Member of the Constituent Assembly of Mexico City by Proportional Representation
- In office 15 September 2016 – 31 January 2017

Delegational Head of Iztapalapa
- In office 10 December 2009 – 30 November 2012
- Designated by: Legislative Assembly of the Federal District
- Preceded by: Rafael Acosta Ángeles
- Succeeded by: Salvador Valencia Guzmán

Member of the Congress of the Union for Mexico City's 25th district
- In office 1 September 2003 – 31 August 2006
- Preceded by: María Magdalena García González
- Succeeded by: Miguel Ángel Solares Chávez

Member of the Legislative Assembly of the Federal District for the 29th District
- In office 15 September 2000 – 14 September 2003
- Preceded by: Daniel Martínez Enríquez
- Succeeded by: Aleida Alavez Ruiz

Member of the Congress of the Union for Mexico City's 22nd district
- In office 1 September 1997 – 31 August 2000
- Preceded by: Víctor Manuel Álvarez Trasviña
- Succeeded by: Esteban Daniel González Enríquez

Personal details
- Born: Clara Marina Brugada Molina; 12 August 1963 (age 63) Mexico City, Mexico
- Party: Morena (2014–present)
- Other political affiliations: Party of the Democratic Revolution (1995–2012)
- Education: Metropolitan Autonomous University (MEcon)

Clara Marina Brugada Molina (born August 12, 1963) is a Mexican politician and economist serving as the head of government of Mexico City after winning the 2024 election. A member of the National Regeneration Movement (Morena), she formerly served as mayor of the borough of Iztapalapa and as a federal and district legislator.

== Early life and education ==
Brugada was born on August 12, 1963, in Mexico City. After her father died at 15, she moved with her family to Chiapas, a southern state in Mexico with high levels of poverty. The economic inequality and poverty she saw there prompted her to study economics.

She attended the Universidad Autónoma Metropolitana (UAM) in Iztapalapa from 1980 to 1985, where she earned a degree in economics. She later worked as an advisor for DECA Equipo Pueblo, a civil association.

== Political career ==
=== Early career ===
Brugada first ran for political office 1995, where she was elected as a councilor for the San Miguel Teotongo neighborhood in the inaugural citizen council of Iztapalapa.

In 1997, she was elected to the federal Chamber of Deputies as a member of the PRD as the representative for District 22 (Sierra de Santa Catarina). In 2000, she was elected as a deputy in the Legislative Assembly of the Federal District (now the Congress of Mexico City). She returned to the federal Chamber of Deputies in the 2003 election.

=== Federal District (Mexico City) politics ===
Brugada joined the government of Head of Government (mayor) Marcelo Ebrard following his victory in the 2006 election. In 2009, she became head of the borough of Iztapalapa, serving until 2012. After the conclusion of her term in 2012, Brugada left the PRD in 2012, and in 2014 joined Morena, a party founded by Andrés Manuel López Obrador. She was voted Secretary of Welfare of the National Executive Committee of Morena, and two years later she became the Deputy and Vice President of the Constituent Assembly of Mexico City.

==== Borough mayoralty of Iztapalapa (2018–2024) ====
In the 2018 elections, Brugada was elected borough mayor of Iztapalapa, and was reelected in 2021. As mayor, she implemented several infrastructure and community projects, such as the construction of the second line of the Cablebus (an elevated trolleybus), mural projects and community centers called Utopías. The aim of this last initiative was to facilitate access to public services for the communities of Iztapalapa (with a population close to 2 million). Utopías won the International Observatory on Participatory Democracy (IOPD) award for 2024.

==== Mayoralty of Mexico City (2024–present) ====
In September 2023, she resigned as borough mayor in order to run for mayor of Mexico City in the 2024 election. Brugada was chosen as Morena's candidate over former Secretary of Citizen Security Omar García Harfuch. On 2 June 2024, Brugada was elected mayor. She was inaugurated on 5 October. Among her pledges is to improve security for women, alleviate the ongoing water crisis, prevent forced evictions and prioritize rental housing for youth with the option to buy. She has a feminist perspective, and she plans for her cabinets to reflect this. Her cabinet is composed of 10 men and 11 women.

==== Murder of Ximena Guzman and Jose Muñoz ====
On 20 May 2025, Ximena Guzmán and José Muñoz, two of the officials closest to Clara Brugada, head of the Mexico City government, were shot dead in an attack on the streets of the Mexican capital. The incident, which the Brugada administration described as a "direct assault," occurred in broad daylight while the vehicle carrying the officials was stopped between Calzada de Tlalpan and Napoleón Street in the Benito Juárez borough.

== Personal life ==
She is not married and has no children. She has said she planned to dedicate her life to her community.
