= Santa Cruz del Rincón =

Municipality in the Mexican state of Guerrero

Santa Cruz del Rincón Xkuaa
- Municipality
- Location of Santa Cruz del Rincón Santa Cruz del Rincón (Mexico)
- Coordinates: 16°59′45″N 98°44′10″W
- Country: Mexico
- State: Guerrero
- Incorporated: 21 May 2022
- Seat: Santa Cruz del Rincón

Government
  - President: Godofredo Avilés Mendoza

Area
  - Total: 88.72 km^{2} (34.25 sq mi)
- Elevation (of seat): 606 m (1,988 ft)

Population (2020 Census)
  - Total: 6,851
  - Density: 77.22/km^{2} (200.0/sq mi)
  - Seat: 1,677
- Time zone: UTC-6 (Central)
- Postal codes: 41524–41527
- Area code: 757

Santa Cruz del Rincón (Me'phaa: Xkuaa, "flat place") is a municipality in the Mexican state of Guerrero. It is located about 100 kilometres (62 mi) southeast of the state capital of Chilpancingo. Its creation from the municipality of Malinaltepec was approved in 2021 and went into force on 21 May 2022.

== Geography ==
The municipality of Santa Cruz del Rincón is located at the headwaters of the Marquelia River in the transition zone between the Costa Chica and the Sierra Madre del Sur of eastern Guerrero. It borders the municipalities of Malinaltepec to the north, Iliatenco to the northeast, and San Luis Acatlán to the south and west. The highest point of Santa Cruz del Rincón is its tripoint with Malinaltepec and Iliatenco at Cerro Ardilla, 1,763 metres (5,784 ft) above sea level. The municipality covers an area of 89.55 square kilometres (34.58 sq mi). Since 2011, 23.8 square kilometres (9.2 sq mi) of the part of the municipality east of the main north–south highway has been protected as a Voluntary Conservation Area.

Santa Cruz del Rincón has a subhumid temperate climate with rain in the summer. Average temperatures range between 22 and 26 °C (72–79 °F).

== History ==
Due to a lack of basic infrastructure and services, Santa Cruz del Rincón and its surrounding communities had been demanding the creation of an independent municipal government since 1964. On 31 August 2021, the Guerrero state congress approved the formation of the municipality of Santa Cruz del Rincón from nineteen localities previously belonging to Malinaltepec. The state constitutional amendment establishing the municipality was passed on 13 January 2022 and went into force on 21 May 2022.

== Administration ==
Santa Cruz del Rincón will hold its first elections as an independent municipality in 2024. An interim administration was appointed in September 2023, led by municipal president Godofredo Avilés Mendoza. The municipal government of Santa Cruz del Rincón consists of a municipal president, a councillor (Spanish: síndico), and six trustees (regidores).

The CRAC–PC, a community self-defence group serving indigenous communities in eastern Guerrero, operates in the area.

== Demographics ==
In the 2020 INEGI census, the localities that now comprise the municipality of Santa Cruz del Rincón recorded a population of 6851 inhabitants. The municipal seat, also named Santa Cruz del Rincón or just El Rincón, recorded a population of 1677 inhabitants in the 2020 Census. Other localities in the municipality with over a thousand people are El Potrerillo and Tierra Colorada, which recorded populations of 1393 and 1020 inhabitants respectively in the 2020 Census. According to the 2010 Census, 70% of the population in Santa Cruz del Rincón spoke the Me'phaa or Tlapanec language.

== Economy and infrastructure ==
The economy of Santa Cruz del Rincón is based on agriculture: corn, coffee and hibiscus are the main crops.

A paved highway runs north to south through the municipality, connecting it with Tlapa de Comonfort to the north and Marquelia to the south.

Several educational institutions operate in Santa Cruz del Rincón, including a public library, a junior high school and a high school, a branch of the National Pedagogic University, and a branch of UNISUR (Universidad Intercultural de los Pueblos del Sur), which offers informal education for indigenous youth.
