= Eduardo Ramírez Aguilar =

Mexican politician

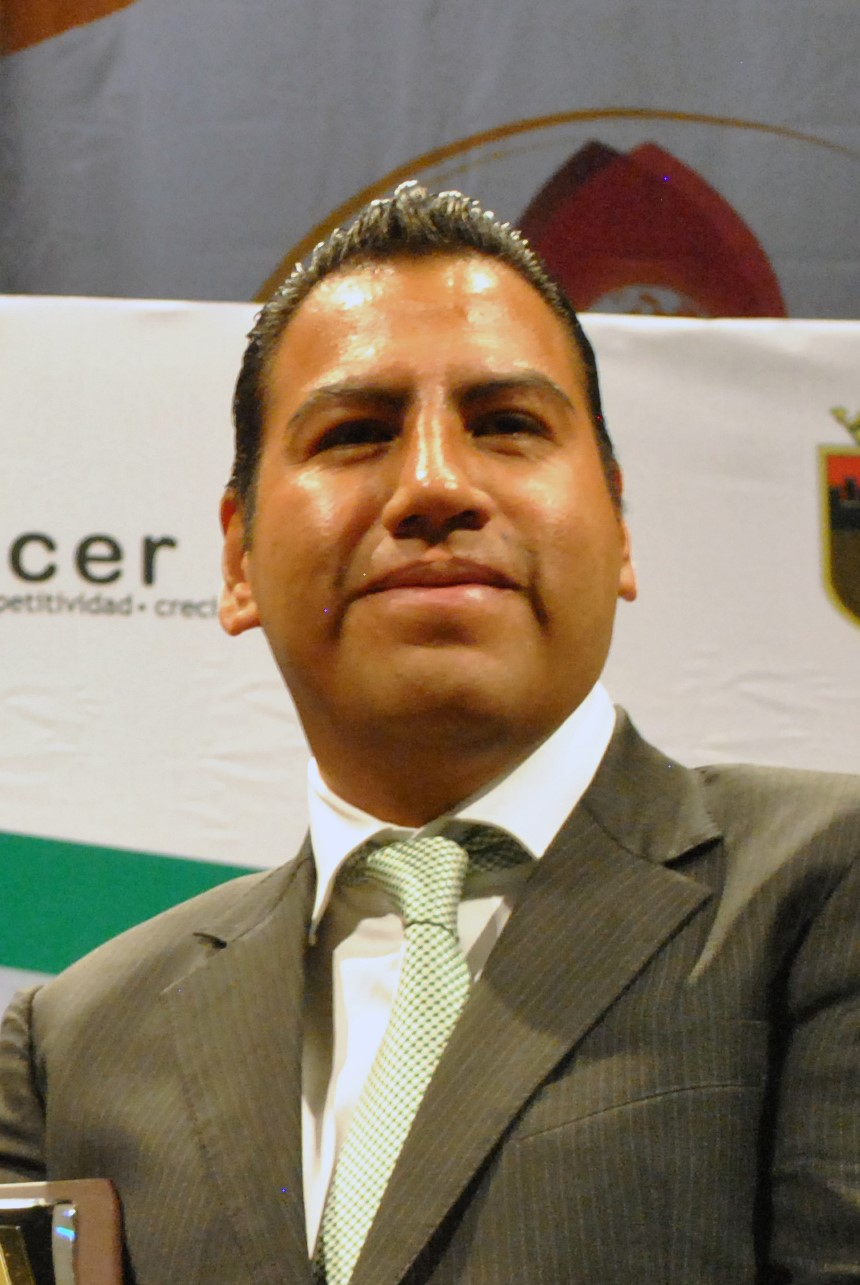
- Ramírez Aguilar in 2013

Governor of Chiapas
- Incumbent
- Assumed office 8 December 2024
- Preceded by: Rutilio Escandón

President of the Senate
- In office 1 September 2020 – 31 August 2021
- Preceded by: Mónica Fernández Balboa
- Succeeded by: Olga Sánchez Cordero

Senator for Chiapas
- In office 1 September 2018 – 1 February 2024
- Preceded by: Luis Armando Melgar Bravo
- Succeeded by: José Antonio Aguilar Castillejos (alternate)

Personal details
- Born: 13 October 1973 (age 52) Comitán, Chiapas, Mexico
- Party: MORENA
- Education: Universidad Realistica de México
- Occupation: Lawyer, politician

Óscar Eduardo Ramírez Aguilar (born 13 October 1973) is a Mexican politician affiliated with the National Regeneration Movement (MORENA). Born in Comitán, Chiapas, he is a law graduate. He is the current governor of Chiapas after winning the 2024 election.

== Career ==
Ramírez Aguilar served as the mayor of his hometown of Comitán in 2008–2010. In the 2012 general election he was elected to the Chamber of Deputies to represent the 8th district of Chiapas for the Ecologist Green Party of Mexico (PVEM) during the 62nd Congress (31 August 2012 – 16 July 2013). He was subsequently elected to the Senate for Chiapas on the Morena ticket in the 2018 general election.

Ramírez stepped down from his Senate seat on 1 February 2024 and ran for the governorship of Chiapas in the 2 June 2024 local election, representing the Sigamos Haciendo Historia coalition (comprising Morena, PT, PVEM and the local parties Chiapas Unidos and Mover a Chiapas). He won the election with 79% of the vote, beating Olga Luz Espinosa of the Fuerza y Corazón por México coalition into a distant second place.
