= Manuel Velasco Coello =

Mexican politician

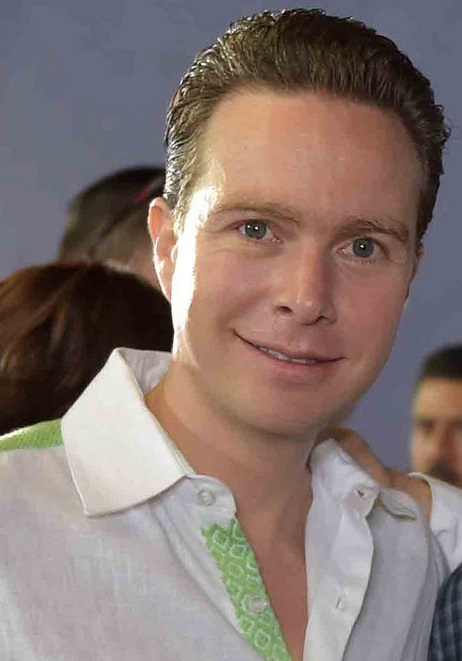
- Velasco in 2012

Governor of Chiapas
- In office 8 December 2012 – 7 December 2018
- Preceded by: Juan Sabines Guerrero
- Succeeded by: Rutilio Escandón

President of the National Conference of Governors
- Incumbent
- Assumed office 22 May 2018
- Preceded by: Arturo Núñez Jiménez

Senator of the Congress of the Union for Chiapas First Formula
- In office 1 September 2006 – 28 February 2012
- Preceded by: José Antonio Aguilar Bodegas
- Succeeded by: Luis Armando Melgar Bravo

Deputy of the Congress of the Union Plurinominal
- In office 1 September 2003 – 24 April 2006

Member of the Congress of Chiapas Plurinominal
- In office 15 November 2001 – 31 August 2003

Personal details
- Born: 7 April 1980 (age 46) Tuxtla Gutiérrez, Chiapas, Mexico
- Party: PVEM
- Spouse: Anahí Puente (m. 2015)
- Children: Manuel (b. 2017); Emiliano (b. 2020)
- Profession: Lawyer and politician

Manuel Velasco Coello (born 7 April 1980) is a Mexican lawyer and politician and a member of PVEM. He served as the Governor of Chiapas from 2012 to 2018. He was the first PVEM politician to become a governor. Prior to his governorship, he served as a state deputy, Federal deputy and Senator, each time becoming the youngest person to ever hold such office.

Velasco Coello was elected as a Senator in 2018 and served his term until 2024. In the 2024 Senate election, he was re-elected for a term extending to 2030. He currently serves as the coordinator of the PVEM parliamentary group and is a member of the Political Coordination Board. Additionally, he is a member of the Belisario Domínguez Medal Committee.

== Life and career ==
Velasco was born on 7 April 1980 in Tuxtla Gutiérrez, Chiapas' capital. He was elected to Congress of Chiapas in 2001, becoming the youngest person to be ever elected to Chiapas' state legislature.

In 2003, he was elected Deputy of the LIX Legislature of the Mexican Congress representing Chiapas. At the age of 23, he became the youngest person to serve as a federal deputy. He left his Chamber seat to run for Senate, winning Chiapas' seat in the July elections. At the age of 26, Velasco set another history by becoming the youngest Senator in Mexican history.

In 2012, Velasco ran on a PRI-PVEM coalition ticket in the 2012 gubernatorial election and won, becoming Chiapas' governor later that year.

On December 9, 2014, a video showing Velasco slap one of his assistants went viral. The video, recorded on a mobile phone, presents Velasco Coello behind a mesh barrier saluting people, when a woman dressed in red pulls his arm and the governor leads her to a young man walking behind him. After indicating the woman to talk to his assistant, unexpectedly, the governor slaps the young man in the face and, while walking, he is seen recriminating him as he follows Velasco. Velasco was forced to publicly apologise.

== Personal life ==
He is the son of Leticia Coello Garrido and José Manuel Velasco Siles (1948–1988) and is married to actress and singer Anahí Puente, with whom he has two sons.

He is the grandson of the former Governor of Chiapas, Manuel Velasco Suárez.

Preceded by Juan Sabines Guerrero	Governor of Chiapas; 2012 — 2018	Succeeded by Rutilio Escandón
