= Ñuu Savi =

Municipality in the Mexican state of Guerrero

- Municipality
- Location of Ñuu Savi Ñuu Savi (Mexico)
- Coordinates: 16°56′45″N 99°00′29″W
- Country: Mexico
- State: Guerrero
- Incorporated: 21 May 2022
- Seat: Coapinola

Government
  - President: Donaciano Morales Porfirio

Area
  - Total: 361.94 km^{2} (139.75 sq mi)
- Elevation (of seat): 944 m (3,097 ft)

Population (2020 Census)
  - Total: 11,099
  - Density: 30.665/km^{2} (79.423/sq mi)
  - Seat: 387
- Time zone: UTC-6 (Central)
- Postal codes: 39210–21219
- Area code: 745

Ñuu Savi (Mixtec: "people of the rain") is a municipality in the Mexican state of Guerrero. It is located 85 kilometres (53 mi) southeast of the state capital of Chilpancingo. Its creation from the municipality of Ayutla de los Libres was approved in 2021 and went into force on 21 May 2022.

== Geography ==
The municipality of Ñuu Savi is located in the Costa Chica region of eastern Guerrero. It borders the municipalities of Acatepec to the north, San Luis Acatlán to the east, Cuautepec to the south, and Ayutla de los Libres to the west. The municipality covers an area of 361.94 square kilometres (139.75 sq mi).

Ñuu Savi has a subhumid temperate climate with rain in the summer. Average temperatures range between 20 and 28 °C (68–82 °F), and average annual precipitation is between 1,300 and 2,000 millimetres (51–79 in).

== History ==
Coapinola, the municipal seat of Ñuu Savi, is the oldest settlement in the area, and was once a centre of Mixtec local government. The area fell under control of the Mexica Empire in 1487 and was incorporated into the province of Ayotlán (present-day Ayutla) on the border with Yopitzinco, the territory of the Yope people.

The perpetual marginalization of the Mixtec inhabitants of Ayutla in the following centuries ultimately led to a political awakening and demands for indigenous self-government. This process began in the 1970s through the efforts of local activists such as Hilario Ramírez Morales, who was assassinated in 1981. It gained momentum from the Zapatista uprising of 1994, which led to reprisals by the Mexican government, including incidents of forced sterilization, and the massacre of eleven indigenous leaders in El Charco by the Mexican Army in 1998. Security improved in the area after 2012, when the local community established its own self-defence group affiliated with the CRAC–PC.

A further step toward self-government took place in 2018, when Ayutla became the first municipality in Guerrero to hold nonpartisan elections governed by customary law. After more consultation with the local population, on 31 August 2021 the Guerrero state legislature approved the creation of the municipality of Ñuu Savi comprising the Mixtec communities of Ayutla de los Libres. The state constitutional amendment establishing the municipality was passed on 13 January 2022 and went into force on 21 May 2022.

== Administration ==
Ñuu Savi will hold its first elections as an independent municipality in 2024. An interim administration was appointed in August 2023, led by municipal president Donaciano Morales Porfirio. The municipal government of San Nicolás comprises a municipal president, a councillor (Spanish: síndico), and six trustees (regidores).

== Demographics ==
In the 2020 INEGI census, the localities that now comprise the municipality of Ñuu Savi recorded a population of 11,099 inhabitants. The municipal seat of Coapinola recorded a population of 387 inhabitants in the 2020 Census. The most populous localities in the municipality are Ahuacachahue and La Concordia, which recorded populations of 1505 and 1125 inhabitants respectively in the 2020 Census.

== Economy and infrastructure ==
Ñuu Savi is one of the poorest municipalities in Guerrero. It lacks a hospital, and only primary and telesecundaria schooling are available. The local economy is based on subsistence agriculture: corn, beans and sugarcane are the main crops.
