= Rutilio Escandón =

Mexican lawyer and politician (born 1958)

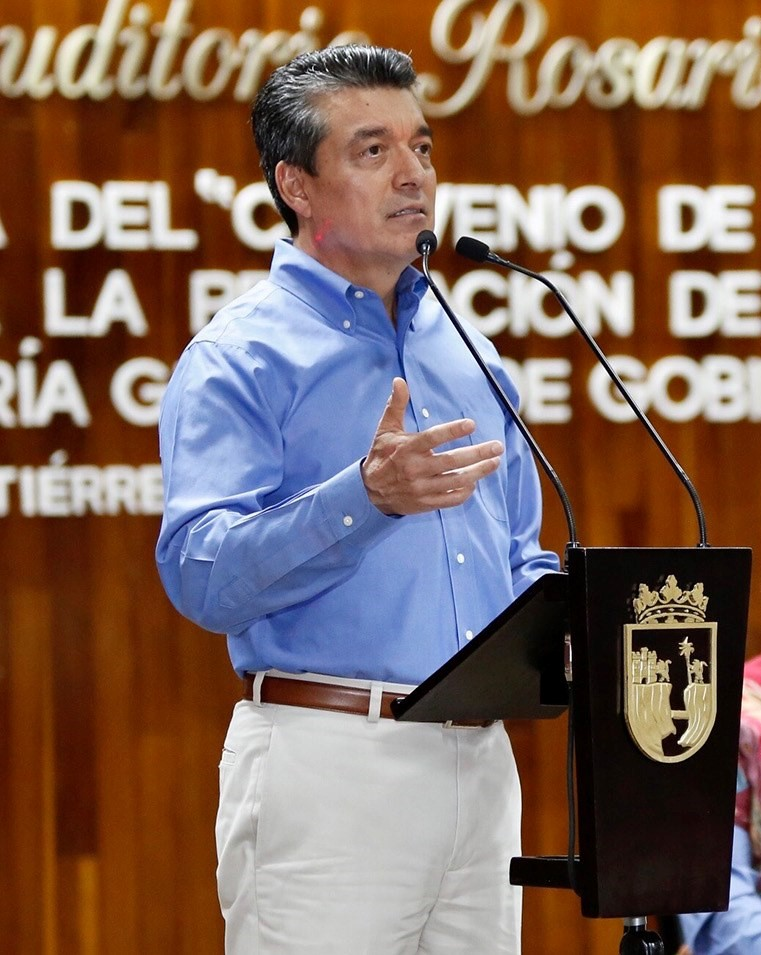
- Escandón In 2022

Governor of Chiapas
- In office 8 December 2018 – 7 December 2024
- Preceded by: Manuel Velasco Coello
- Succeeded by: Eduardo Ramírez Aguilar

Deputy of the Congress of the Union for the 3rd Circumscription
- In office 1 September 2006 – 31 August 2009
- Constituency: Chiapas

Senator of the Congress of the Union for Chiapas
- In office 1 September 2000 – 31 August 2006
- Preceded by: Irma Serrano
- Succeeded by: Rubén Velázquez López

Personal details
- Born: Rutilio Cruz Escandón Cadenas; 3 May 1958 (age 67) Venustiano Carranza, Chiapas, Mexico
- Party: MORENA
- Spouse: Rosalinda López Hernández (m. 2013; died 2024)
- Education: Autonomous University of Baja California (LLB); National Autonomous University of Mexico (LLM, PhD)
- Occupation: Lawyer

Rutilio Cruz Escandón Cadenas (born 3 May 1958) is a Mexican lawyer and politician from Chiapas. He is affiliated with MORENA and was the Governor of Chiapas from 2018 to 2024. Before becoming governor, he represented Chiapas as a senator of the LVIII and LIX and as a federal deputy in the LX Legislature.

== Life ==
Escandón grew up in Baja California, where he obtained a law degree at the Universidad Autónoma de Baja California in 1981 and was deputy director, and then director, of the state public property registry from 1981 to 1986. He became a law professor at the UNAM and the Universidad La Salle in 1989, obtaining a master's degree in law from the UNAM in 1990 and a doctorate the next year. After several years at the Instituto Nacional de Migración in Guerrero and Chiapas, he became the director general of the Chiapas Electoral Commission in 1994 and returned to teaching at the Institute of Higher Studies in Tuxtla Gutiérrez.

In 1998, Escandón joined the PRD. After losing a bid to be elected to the Chiapas state legislature that year, Escandón became the state PRD's secretary general. In 2000, he was elected senator, serving as a secretary on the Governance and Justice Commissions in the LVIII Legislature and as the president of the Social Development Commission in the LIX Legislature. He also was a national councilor for the party. Termed out of the Senate, he was placed on the PRD proportional representation list from the third region and served as a federal deputy in the LX Legislature, where he presided over the Special Commission for the National Farm Agreement.

After his tenure in Congress, in 2013, Governor Manuel Velasco Coello nominated him to preside over the state's courts with the support of the PVEM, Velasco's party, which controlled the state legislature. Escandón is known to be close with Velasco Coello's grandfather.

In September 2017, Morena named Escandón its head of organization in Chiapas, a precursor to his official naming as the gubernatorial candidate in January. Aided by a split between the PRI and governing PVEM as well as strong support nationwide for Morena, Escandón beat the other challengers handily on election night with exit polls putting him between 43 and 51 percent of the vote.
