= Margarita González Saravia =

Mexican politician (born 1956)

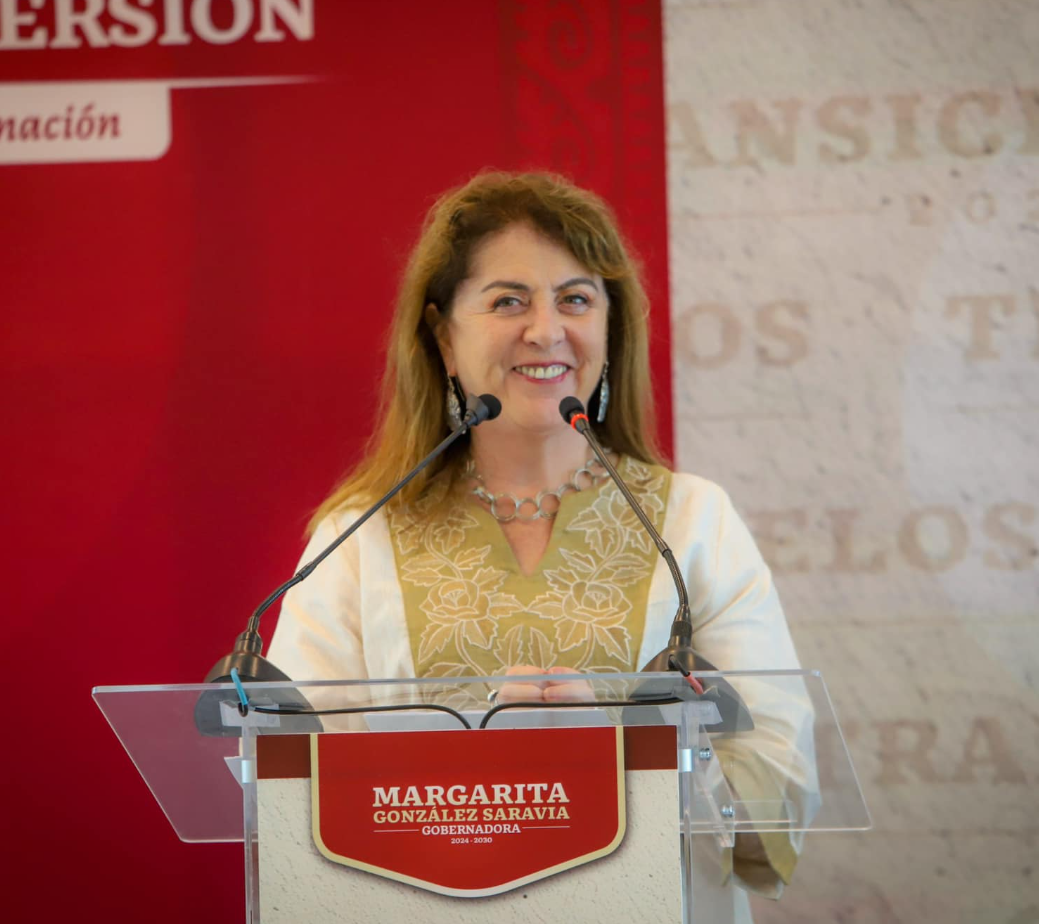

Governor of Morelos
- Incumbent
- Assumed office 1 October 2024
- Preceded by: Cuauhtémoc Blanco

Personal details
- Born: Margarita González Saravia Calderón; 13 June 1956 (age 70) Mexico City, Mexico
- Party: Morena
- Spouse: Maye Villa
- Education: National Council for the Evaluation of Social Development Policy

Margarita González Saravia Calderón (born June 13, 1956) is a Mexican politician and businesswoman, and a member of the Morena party. From October 2020 to July 2023 she was general director of the National Lottery for Public Assistance. She is the governor of Morelos after winning the 2024 election, making her the first woman to govern the state.

== Early years ==
Margarita González Saravia was born in Mexico City on June 13, 1956, and grew up in the state of Morelos. She studied a degree in tourism planning through the National Council for the Evaluation of Social Development Policy (Coneval). As a businesswoman, she has been dedicated to the tourism industry in the state of Morelos. She was president of the State Association of Spas and Water Parks of Morelos.

== Political career ==
She was a founding member of the Democratic Revolution Party (PRD) and the National Regeneration Movement (Morena) party. In 1974 she founded the Union of Popular Colonies of the Valley of Mexico, as well as the Union of Rural Workers and the National Coordinating Committee Plan de Ayala. From May 2010 to September 2012 she was undersecretary of tourism for the state of Morelos in the cabinet of PAN governor Marco Adame Castillo.

From 2015 to 2018 she was part of the cabinet of the municipal president of Cuernavaca, Cuauhtémoc Blanco. In that administration, she held the position of secretary of economic development and undersecretary of tourism. Subsequently, when Cuauhtémoc Blanco assumed the position of governor of Morelos, González Saravia joined his cabinet as secretary of tourism and culture, from October 1, 2018, to October 1, 2020.

In October 2020, González Saravia was appointed as general director of the National Lottery for Public Assistance by President Andrés Manuel López Obrador. In July 2023 she left the position to seek her party's candidacy for the governorship of Morelos. On November 10, 2023, Morena selected González Saravia as its candidate for the 2024 gubernatorial election, which she won with over 48% of the vote.
