= Sigamos Haciendo Historia =

Political alliance in Mexico

Let's Keep Making History Sigamos Haciendo Historia
- Party presidents: Ariadna Montiel Reyes; Alberto Anaya; Karen Castrejón Trujillo
- Presidential candidate: Claudia Sheinbaum
- Founded: 19 November 2023
- Preceded by: Juntos Hacemos Historia
- Ideology: Left-wing nationalism Progressivism; Green politics Democratic socialism
- Political position: Centre-left to left-wing
- Member parties: National Regeneration Movement (MORENA); Labor Party (PT); Ecologist Green Party of Mexico (PVEM)
- Chamber of Deputies: 364 / 500
- Senate: 87 / 128

Sigamos Haciendo Historia (English: Let's Keep Making History) is a centre-left to left-wing, catch-all Mexican electoral coalition formed by the National Regeneration Movement (Morena), the Labor Party (PT), and the Green Ecologist Party of Mexico (PVEM) for the 2024 Mexican general election. Some local parties also participate in the coalition for their respective state elections.

The coalition is the successor to Juntos Hacemos Historia, an alliance that participated in the 2021 Mexican elections, the 2022 and 2023 state elections.

== History ==
=== Initial stages ===
On 11 June 2023, Juntos Hacemos Historia announced an internal selection procedure to choose a de facto presidential nominee. To run for the nomination, potential candidates have to resign from their government positions, according to the coalition. Marcelo Ebrard, secretary of international affairs, was the first to register as a candidate, followed by Claudia Sheinbaum, Mexico City's head of government. Other contenders include Adán Augusto López, Gerardo Fernández Noroña, Ricardo Monreal, and Manuel Velasco.

==== Primary election ====
The coalition's internal process included five opinion polls, with four chosen from a list of each candidate's two preferred polling organizations. The polls ran from 28 August to 4 September.

On 6 September 2023, Sheinbaum was named the winner and later confirmed as the potential nominee.

| Candidate | % |
|---|---|
| Claudia Sheinbaum | 39.38 |
| Marcelo Ebrard | 25.80 |
| Adán Augusto López | 11.18 |
| Gerardo Fernández Noroña | 10.62 |
| Manuel Velasco Coello | 7.16 |
| Ricardo Monreal | 5.86 |

Nominee

- Claudia Sheinbaum, Head of Government of Mexico City (2018–2023) and Mayor of Tlalpan (2015–2017)

==== Creation of the coalition ====
It became an official coalition on 19 November 2023, once Claudia Sheinbaum registered as the sole pre-candidate for the presidency of the republic by the National Regeneration Movement, the Labor Party, and the Ecologist Green Party of Mexico for the 2024 general election.

== Ideology ==
=== Platform ===
The coalition's political platform, as well as the government program, primarily emphasizes a mixed economy; the promotion of "Mexican humanism"; well-being and social justice; continuation of the current government's programs; and the rescue of the countryside and food self-sufficiency.

Regarding the rule of law and electoral policies, they seek to limit the power of the National Electoral Institute and the Electoral Tribunal over the parties, as well as significantly reduce the cost of the bureaucratic apparatus in charge of organizing, supervising, and qualifying electoral processes. They strive to modify constitutional provisions in order to prevent being forced to choose between justice and the rule of law, as well as to enhance participatory democracy.

=== Analysis ===
The coalition has been described as catch-all. In Telediario, it is described as campaigning with left-wing nationalism and supporting some social programs, but adopting some economic policies of the neoliberal center-right. The Globe and Mail described the coalition as led by the left, but a big tent of "everyone from progressives to evangelicals."

== Election results ==
=== Presidential elections ===
| Election year | Candidate | Votes | % | Outcome | Notes |
|---|---|---|---|---|---|
| 2024 | Claudia Sheinbaum | 35,924,519 | 61.18% | ✓ Elected | |

=== Congressional elections ===
==== Chamber of Deputies ====
| Election | Constituency | | PR | | No. of seats | Position | Presidency |
| Election | Votes | % | Votes | % | No. of seats | Position | Presidency |
|---|---|---|---|---|---|---|---|
| 2024 | 32,316,689 | 56.82 | 32,535,023 | 56.8 | 364 / 500 | Supermajority | Claudia Sheinbaum |

==== Senate ====
| Election | Constituency | | PR | | No. of seats | Position | Presidency |
| Election | Votes | % | Votes | % | No. of seats | Position | Presidency |
|---|---|---|---|---|---|---|---|
| 2024 | 32,772,088 | 57.43 | 33,057,610 | 57.36 | 83 / 128 | Majority | Claudia Sheinbaum |
