= Governor of Guanajuato =

Governor of Mexican state

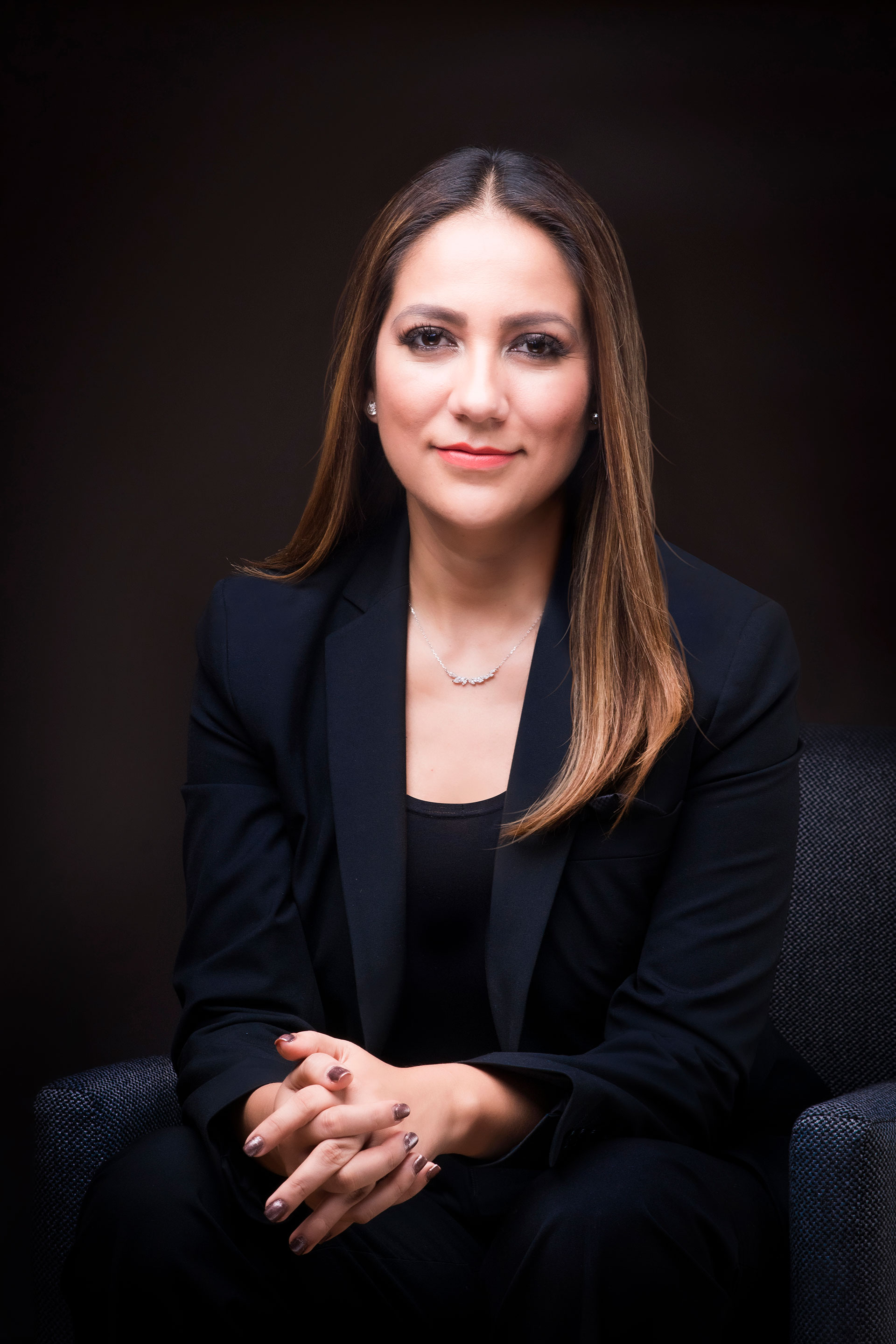
- Incumbent; Libia García Muñoz Ledo since September 26, 2024
- Term length: Six years, non-renewable.
- Inaugural holder: Carlos Montes de Oca
- Formation: 1824

This is a list of the governors of the Mexican state of Guanajuato since 1917.

Name	Took office	Left office
Fernando Dávila (interim)	December 18, 1916	June 14, 1917
Agustín Alcocer	June 15, 1917	September 18, 1919
Fernando Alcocer (interim)	September 19, 1919	September 24, 1919
Federico Montes	September 25, 1919	February 26, 1920
Toribio Villaseñor (interim)	February 27, 1920	May 4, 1920
Agustín de Ezcurdia (interim)	May 5, 1920	May 10, 1920
Antonio Madrazo	May 11, 1920	May 11, 1920
Enrique Colunga (provisional)	May 12, 1920	September 15, 1920
Antonio Madrazo	September 16, 1920	September 25, 1923
Enrique Colunga	September 26, 1923	October 3, 1923
Ignacio García Téllez (interim)	October 4, 1923	November 2, 1923
Jesús S. Soto (interim)	November 3, 1923	April 21, 1924
Arturo Sierra (interim)	April 22, 1924	November 27, 1924
Enrique Colunga	November 28, 1924	May 5, 1927
Octaviano Mendoza González (interim)	May 6, 1927	September 25, 1927
Agustín Arroyo	September 26, 1927	September 25, 1931
Enrique Hernández Álvarez	September 26, 1931	June 3, 1932
José Reynoso (provisional)	June 4, 1932	September 25, 1932
Melchor Ortega	September 26, 1932	September 25, 1935
Jesús Yáñez Maya	September 26, 1935	December 16, 1935
Enrique Fernández Martínez (provisional)	December 17, 1935	April 22, 1937
Luis I. Rodríguez	April 23, 1937	January 20, 1938
Enrique Romero (interim)	January 21, 1938	April 24, 1938
Rafael Rangel (interim)	April 25, 1938	November 13, 1938
Ernesto Arnoux S. (interim)	November 14, 1938	December 2, 1938
Rafael Rangel (interim)	December 3, 1938	January 1, 1939
Mauro Visoso (interim)	January 2, 1939	January 3, 1939
Ernesto Arnoux S. (interim)	January 4, 1939	January 22, 1939
Rafael Rangel (interim)	January 23, 1939	May 31, 1939
Ernesto Arnoux S. (interim)	June 1, 1939	June 5, 1939
Rafael Rangel (interim)	June 6, 1939	September 25, 1939
Ernesto Hidalgo	September 26, 1943	January 8, 1946
Nicéforo Guerrero (provisional)	January 9, 1946	September 21, 1947
J. Jesús Castorena (substitute)	September 22, 1947	October 28, 1948
Antonio Torres Gómez (interim)	October 29, 1948	October 29, 1948
Luis Díaz Infante (substitute)	October 30, 1948	September 25, 1949
José Aguilar y Maya	September 26, 1949	September 25, 1955
J. Jesús Rodríguez Gaona	September 26, 1955	September 25, 1961
Juan José Torres Landa	September 26, 1961	September 25, 1967
Manuel M. Moreno	September 26, 1967	September 25, 1973
Luis H. Ducoing Gamba	September 26, 1973	September 25, 1979
Enrique Velasco Ibarra	September 26, 1979	June 25, 1984
Agustín Téllez Cruces (interim)	June 26, 1984	September 25, 1985
Rafael Corrales Ayala	September 26, 1985	September 25, 1991
Carlos Medina Plascencia (interim)	September 26, 1991	June 25, 1995
Vicente Fox Quesada	June 26, 1995	August 7, 1999
Ramón Martín Huerta (substitute)	August 9, 1999	September 25, 2000
Juan Carlos Romero Hicks	September 26, 2000	September 25, 2006
Juan Manuel Oliva Ramírez	September 26, 2006	March 29, 2012
Héctor López Santillana (substitute)	March 29, 2012	September 25, 2012
Miguel Márquez Márquez	September 26, 2012	September 25, 2018
Diego Sinhué Rodríguez Vallejo	September 26, 2018	September 25, 2024
Libia García Muñoz Ledo	September 26, 2024	Incumbent

== See also ==
- List of Mexican state governors
