= Governor of Chiapas =

Chief executive of the Mexican state of Chiapas

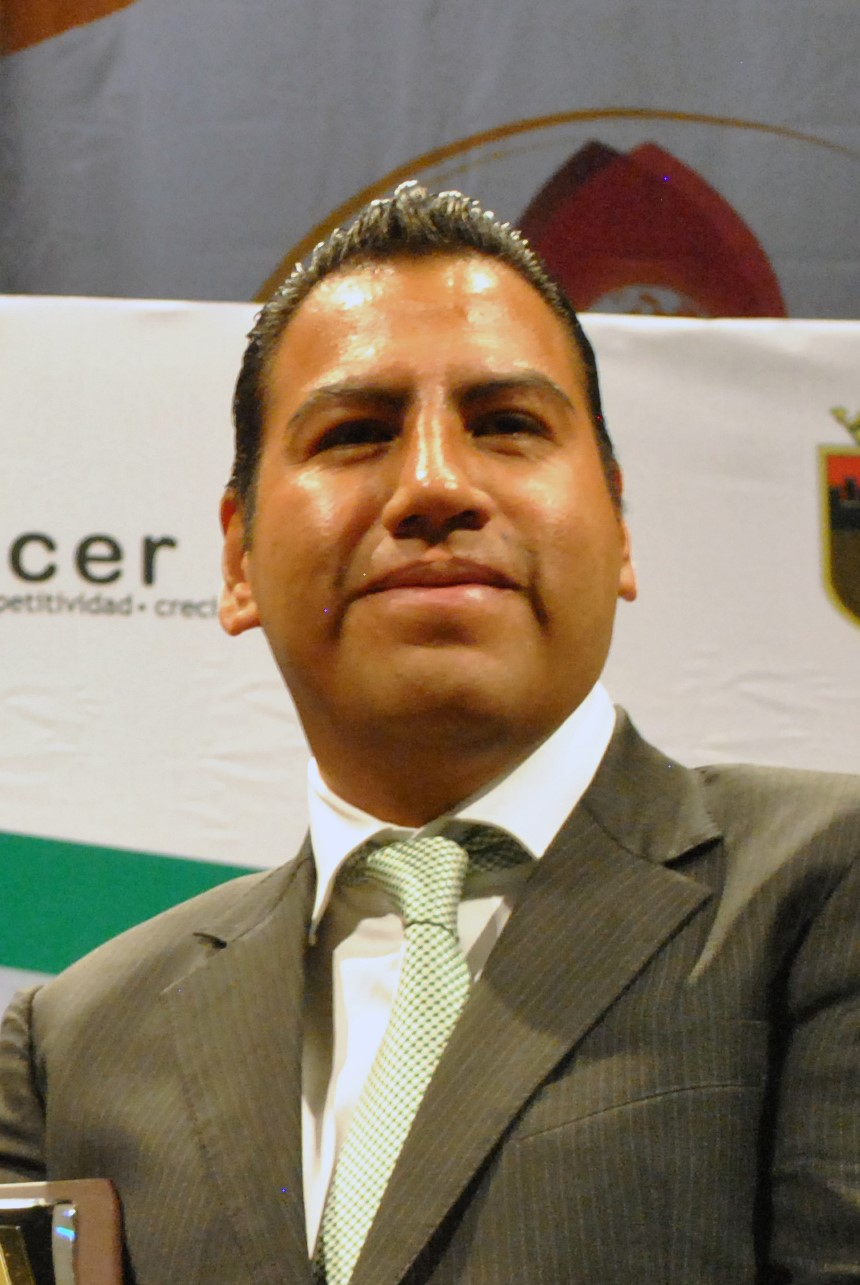
- Incumbent; Eduardo Ramírez Aguilar since December 8, 2024
- Term length: Six years, non-renewable.
- Inaugural holder: Manuel José de Rojas
- Formation: September 14, 1825

The Governor of Chiapas is the chief executive of the Mexican state of Chiapas. The state constitution stipulates a term of 6 years, to which governors can only be elected once. It also specifies the qualifications for becoming governor: a Mexican citizen by birth, aged at least 30 years old, and having not less than 5 years residency in Chiapas. The current governor is Eduardo Ramírez Aguilar from the MRN, who assumed the position in 2024.

- 1825–1826: Manuel José de Rojas
- 1826–1830: José Diego Lara
- 1829: Emeterio Pineda
- 1830–1834: Joaquín Miguel Gutiérrez
- 1830: Emeterio Pineda
- 1830: José Rafael Coello
- 1830–1832: José Ignacio Gutiérrez
- 1832: Manuel Escandón
- 1832: Mariano José Correa
- 1832: Joaquín Miguel Gutiérrez
- 1832: Emeterio Pineda
- 1832–1833: Quirino Domínguez
- 1833: Joaquín Miguel Gutiérrez
- 1833: Emeterio Pineda
- 1833–1834: Joaquín Miguel Gutiérrez
- 1834–1835: Joaquín Miguel Gutiérrez
- 1835: José Mariano Coello
- 1835: Ignacio Tovilla
- 1835–1836: Mariano Montes de Oca
- 1836–1837: Clemente Aceituno
- 1836: Salvador Piñeiro
- 1836: Onofre Reyes
- 1837–1840: José María Sandoval
- 1840–1841: José Diego Lara
- 1841–1842: Salvador Ayanegui
- 1842–1845: Ignacio Barberena
- 1845–1848: Jerónimo Cardona
- 1846–1847: Nicolás Ruiz
- 1847–1848: Jerónimo Cardona
- 1848: Manuel María Parada
- 1848: Jerónimo Cardona
- 1848: Ponciano Solórzano del Barco
- 1848–1849: Fernando Nicolás Maldonado
- 1849–1850: Ramón Larraínzar
- 1850–1855: Fernando Nicolás Maldonado
- 1851: José Farrera
- 1851–1853: Fernando Nicolás Maldonado
- 1853: Domingo Ruiz Molina
- 1853–1855: Fernando Nicolás Maldonado
- 1855–1856: Ángel Albino Corzo
- 1856: Domingo Ruiz Molina
- 1856–1861: Ángel Albino Corzo
- 1857: Francisco Robles
- 1858: Ángel Albino Corzo
- 1858–1859: Matías Castellanos
- 1859–1861: Ángel Albino Corzo
- 1861: Juan Clímaco Corzo
- 1861: Ángel Albino Corzo
- 1861–1863: Juan Clímaco Corzo
- 1863–1864: José Gabriel Esquinca
- 1864–1865: José Pantaleón Domínguez
- 1866: José Mariano García
- 1866–1875: Without information.
- 1875–1876: Moisés Rojas
- 1876: Carlos Borda
- 1876: Eleuterio Villasana
- 1876: Manuel Cerón
- 1877: Diego Betanzos
- 1877: Sebastián Escobar
- 1877: Nicolás Ruiz
- 1877–1878: Sebastián Escobar
- 1878–1879: Juan José Ramírez
- 1879: Mariano Aguilar
- 1879–1883: Miguel Utrilla
- 1883–1886: José María Ramírez
- 1886: Adrián Culebro
- 1886–1887: José María Ramírez
- 1887: Manuel Carrascosa
- 1888: Miguel Utrilla
- 1888–1891: Manuel Carrascosa
- 1891–1893: Emilio Rabasa
- 1893: Raúl del Pino
- 1893–1894: Emilio Rabasa
- 1894–1895: Fausto Moguel
- 1895: Francisco León
- 1896: José María González
- 1896–1899: Francisco León
- 1899: Luis Farrera
- 1899: Francisco León
- 1899: Rafael Pimentel
- 1900: Abraham A. López
- 1901–1902: Rafael Pimentel
- 1902–1903: Onofre Ramos
- 1903–1904: Rafael Pimentel
- 1904: Onofre Ramos
- 1905: Rafael Pimentel
- 1905: Onofre Ramos
- 1905: Rafael Pimentel
- 1905: Miguel Castillo
- 1905: Ramón Rabasa
- 1906: Abraham A. López
- 1906–1908: Ramón Rabasa
- 1908: Abraham A. López
- 1908–1909: Ramón Rabasa
- 1909: José Inés Cano
- 1909: Abraham A. López
- 1909–1910: Ramón Rabasa
- 1910: José Inés Cano
- 1910–1911: Ramón Rabasa
- 1911: José Inés Cano
- 1911: Manuel Trejo
- 1911: Ramón Rabasa
- 1911: Manuel Trejo
- 1911: Reynaldo Gordillo León
- 1911: Policarpio Rueda Fernández
- 1911: Manuel Rovelo Argüello
- 1911: Marco Aurelio Solís
- 1911–1912: Reynaldo Gordillo León
- 1912–1913: Flavio Guillén
- 1913: Marco Aurelio Solís
- 1913: Reynaldo Gordillo León
- 1913–1914: Bernardo Palafox
- 1913–1914: Bernardo Palafox
- 1914: José Inés Cano
- 1914: José María Marín
- 1914: Jesús Agustín Castro
- 1914: Blas Corral
- 1914–1915: Jesús Agustín Castro
- 1915: Blas Corral
- 1915: Jesús Agustín Castro
- 1916: Blas Corral
- 1916: José Ascención González
- 1916: Blas Corral
- 1916–1917: Pablo Villanueva
- 1917–1918: Manuel Fuentes A.
- 1918–1919: Pablo Villanueva
- 1919: Manuel Fuentes A.
- 1919: Pablo Villanueva
- 1919–1920: Pascual Morales Molina
- 1920: Alejo González
- 1920: Francisco G. Ruíz
- 1920: Juan Zertuche
- 1920: Fausto Ruíz
- 1920: Francisco G. Ruíz
- 1920: Amadeo Ruíz
- 1920–1924: Tiburcio Fernández Ruíz
- 1921: Benigno Cal y Mayor
- 1922: Tiburcio Fernández Ruíz
- 1922: Amadeo Ruíz
- 1922–1923: Tiburcio Fernández Ruíz
- 1923: Manuel Encarnación Cruz
- 1923–1924: Tiburcio Fernández Ruíz
- 1924: Rogelio García Castro
- 1924: Tiburcio Fernández Ruíz
- 1924: Luis García
- 1924: Martín Paredes
- 1924: Tiburcio Fernández Ruíz
- 1924: Raúl de León
- 1924: Luis Ramírez Corzo
- 1925: César Córdova
- 1925: Carlos A. Vidal
- 1925: José Castañón
- 1925–1926: Carlos A. Vidal
- 1926: J. Amilcar Vidal
- 1927: Luis P. Vidal
- 1927: Manuel Alvarez
- 1927–1928: Federico Martínez Rojas
- 1928: Amador Coutiño
- 1928: Rosendo Delabre Santeliz
- 1928–1929: Raymundo E. Enríquez
- 1929: Ernesto Constantino Herrera
- 1929: Alvaro Cancino
- 1930: Martín G. Cruz
- 1930: Alvaro Cancino
- 1930: Moisés E. Villers
- 1930: Alberto Domínguez R.
- 1931: José María Brindís
- 1931: Raúl León
- 1932: Mariano G. A. Enríquez
- 1932: Rodolfo Ruíz G.
- 1932: Moisés Enríquez
- 1932: Raymundo Enríquez
- 1932–1936: Victórico R. Grajales
- 1936–1940: Efraín A. Gutiérrez
- 1940–1944: Rafael Pascacio Gamboa
- 1944–1947: Juan M. Esponda
- 1947–1948: César A. Lara
- 1948–1952: Francisco J. Grajales
- 1952–1958: Efraín Aranda Osorio
- 1958–1964: Samuel León Brindis
- 1964–1970: José Castillo Tielemans
- 1970–1976: Manuel Velasco Suárez
- 1976–1977: Jorge de la Vega Domínguez
- 1977–1979: Salomón González Blanco
- 1979–1982: Juan Sabines Gutiérrez
- 1982: Gustavo Armendáriz
- 1982–1988: Absalón Castellanos Domínguez
- 1988–1993: Patrocinio González Garrido
- 1993–1994: Elmar Setzer Marseille
- 1994: Javier López Moreno
- 1994–1995: Eduardo Robledo Rincón
- 1995–1998: Julio César Ruíz Ferro
- 1998–2000: Roberto Albores Guillén
- 2000–2006: Pablo Salazar Mendiguchía
- 2006–2012: Juan José Sabines Guerrero
- 2012–2018: Manuel Velasco Coello
- 2018–2024: Rutilio Escandón
- 2024–present: Eduardo Ramírez Aguilar
