= Congress of Guanajuato =

Legislative body of Guanajato

Congress of the State of Guanajuato Congreso del Estado de Guanajuato
- LXVI Legislature

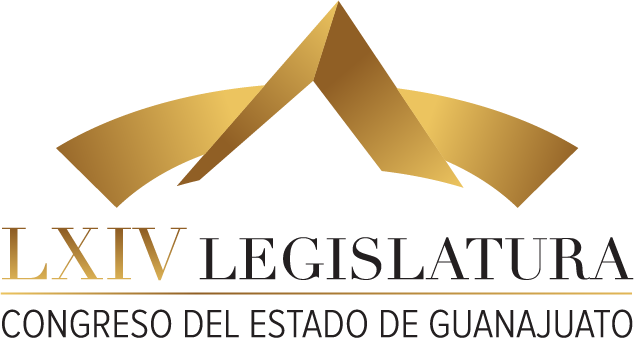

Type
- Type: Unicameral

History
- Founded: October 1, 1826

Leadership
- President: Miriam Reyes Carmona, Morena
- Vice president: Ana María Esquivel Arrona, PAN
- First secretary: José Salvador Tovar Vargas, PAN
- Second secretary: Rocío Cervantes Barba, PRI
- Deputy secretary: Luz Itzel Mendo González, PVEM

Structure
- Seats: 36
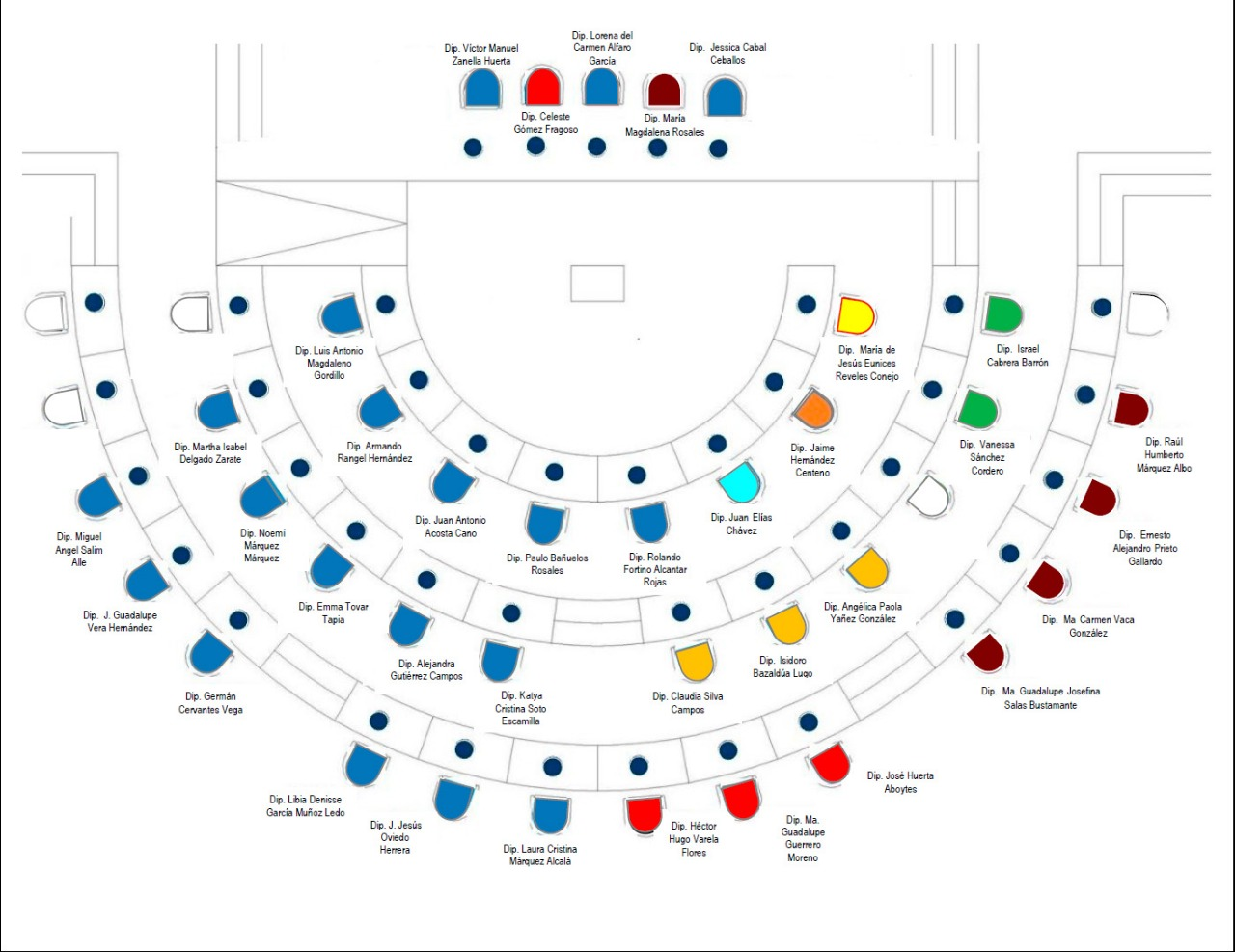
- Political groups: PAN (16) Morena (11) PRI (3) PVEM (2) MC (2) PRD (1) PT (1)
- Length of term: 3 years
- Authority: Title V, Chapter II, Section 1 of the Political Constitution of the State of Guanajuato
- Salary: 178,000 MXN

Elections
- Voting system: First-past-the-post for 22 electoral district seats and mixed-member proportional representation for 14 proportional representation seats
- Last election: 2 June 2024

Meeting place
- Guanajuato, Guanajuato, Mexico

Website
- Website of the Congress of Guanajuato

The Congress of the State of Guanajuato (Spanish: Congreso del Estado de Guanajuato) is the legislative branch of the government of the State of Guanajuato. The Congress is the governmental deliberative body of Guanajuato, which is equal to, and independent of, the executive.

The Congress is unicameral and its current session consists of 36 local deputies (22 elected by the first-past-the-post system and 14 by proportional representation). Deputies are elected to serve for a three-year term.

Since its installation the congress has been renewed 65 times, hence the current session of the Congress of Guanajuato (whose term lasts form to 2024 to 2027) is known as the LXVI Legislature.

== See also ==
- List of Mexican state congresses
