= List of Mexican poets =

This is a list of notable Mexican poets.

== A ==
- Manuel Acuña
- Ignacio Manuel Altamirano
- Pita Amor
- Eduardo Arellano Elías
- Homero Aridjis

== B ==
- Xhevdet Bajraj
- Marcos E. Becerra
- Alberto Blanco
- Minerva Bloom
- Bocafloja
- Rubén Bonifaz Nuño
- Coral Bracho
- Gabriela Brimmer

== C ==
- Manuel Carpio
- Rosario Castellanos
- Roberto Castillo Udiarte
- Alí Chumacero
- Rosina Conde
- Dolores Correa Zapata
- Elsa Cross
- Juana Inés de la Cruz
- Jorge Cuesta

== D ==
- Salvador Díaz Mirón

== E ==
- Genaro Estrada

== F ==
- Isabel Fraire
- Noé de la Flor Casanova
- Malva Flores

== G ==
- Jesús Gardea
- Pedro Garfias
- Francesca Gargallo
- Francisco González Bocanegra
- Enrique González Martínez
- José Gorostiza
- Carlos Graham
- Rosario María Gutiérrez Eskildsen
- Manuel Gutiérrez Nájera

== H ==
- Natalio Hernández
- Efraín Huerta

== L ==
- Rossy Evelin Lima
- Germán List Arzubide
- Sergio Loo
- Pura López Colomé
- Ricardo López Méndez
- Ramón López Velarde
- Gregorio López y Fuentes

== M ==
- Manuel Maples Arce
- Luis María Martínez
- Arturo Meza
- Margarita Michelena
- José Montalvo
- Francisco Monterde
- Fabio Morabito
- Josefa Murillo
- Angelina Muñiz-Huberman

== N ==
- Thelma Nava
- Amado Nervo
- Salvador Novo
- Efrén Núñez Mata

== P ==
- José Emilio Pacheco
- Mario Santiago Papasquiaro
- Octavio Paz
- Carlos Pellicer
- Guillermo Prieto

== R ==
- Alfonso Reyes
- José Rosas Moreno

== S ==
- Jaime Sabines
- Francisco J. Santamaría
- Tomás Segovia
- Francisco Serrano
- Justo Sierra
- Carlos de Sigüenza y Góngora
- Roberto Solis

== T ==
- José Juan Tablada
- Altair Tejeda de Tamez
- José Tlatelpas
- Jaime Torres Bodet
- Julio Torri

== V ==
- Estrella del Valle
- Arqueles Vela
- Xavier Villaurrutia

== W ==
- Sergio Witz

== X ==
- Ramón Xirau

== Z ==
- Gabriel Zaid
- Esperanza Zambrano

== See also ==
- Spanish poetry
- Mexican literature
