= Marcos E. Becerra =

Mexican academic

Marcos E. Becerra (April 25, 1870 – January 7, 1940) was a Mexican prolific writer, poet, and politician. He produced pioneering historical, linguistic, philological, and ethnographic studies relating to his country's pre-Columbian and early colonial past. He held important posts in the Mexican Federal Government as well as in the state governments of Tabasco and Chiapas. He was a distinguished member of the Mexican Academy of History.

== Biography ==
Marcos Enrique Becerra was born in Teapa, Tabasco, to Camilo Becerra y Ballinas, a native of San Cristóbal de las Casas, Chiapas, and Luisa Sánchez Formento. Becerra completed his early schooling in his hometown. In 1900, by way of independent study, he received a teaching degree from the Instituto Juárez of San Juan Bautista. During his youth he worked as a bookbinder, scribe, store clerk, theatre prompter, and, eventually, teacher. One of his very first published works, Guia del lenguaje usual para hablar con propiedad, pureza y corrección, dates from this period (1901) and is based on his autodidactic studies of the Spanish language.

Fame of his remarkable erudition spread quickly and he was encouraged to run in forthcoming elections for Federal Deputy for the State of Tabasco, succeeding in his first attempt. During the final years of the Porfiriato he held the federal post of Director General of Secondary Education of the Secretariat of Public Education. At the XVII International Congress of Americanists, celebrated in Mexico City in September 1910, Becerra presented an important historical paper on Hernán Cortés's 1524-25 expedition to Las Hibueras. The next year, he returned to Tabasco to serve in Governor Manuel Mestre Ghigliazza's administration as Secretary General of Government and as Director of Public Education; consequent to the assassination of President Francisco I. Madero in February 1913 both Ghigliazza and Becerra resigned their posts in protest.

In 1914, Becerra moved to Tuxtla Gutiérrez (the Chiapas state capital), where he would labor as an educator and occupy the same post of Director of Public Education for ten years; during which time he successfully reorganized the state's educational system, founded a school of commerce as well as the Internado Indígena de San Cristóbal (the San Cristóbal Indian Boarding School), which was a model of its kind. In 1921, while still in Tuxtla, he published an important lexicographical work titled La nueva gramática castellana, which, like all his published writings, was the fruit of autodidactic erudition. In 1932, appeared what remains one of his best known scholarly works, Nombres geográficos indígenas de Chiapas, a study of Mayan place names. To these followed sundry studies, published as monographs or articles, on the languages and traditions of the Ch'ol, Mangue, Nahua, Yucatec Maya, and Zoque.

In 1954, occurred the posthumous publication of Becerra's monumental 800 page Rectificaciones y adiciones al Diccionario de la Real Academia Española: a work which encompasses thousands of words and definitions, is rich in indigenous etymologies and grounded in lexicographical authorities.

Marcos E. Becerra, during the last ten years of his life, was a numerary member of the Academia Mexicana de la Historia and held seat 21. He was married twice and was twice a widower, He died, following a long illness, in Mexico City on January 7, 1940.

== See also ==
- Andrés Bello
- Miguel Antonio Caro
- Alfonso Caso
- Rufino José Cuervo
- Joaquín García Icazbalceta
- Rosario María Gutiérrez Eskildsen
- Francisco J. Santamaría

== Published works ==
(List not comprehensive)

- Guia del lenguaje usual para hablar con propiedad, pureza i corrección, 1901.
- Musa breve; sonetos, 1907.
- Nombres geograficos del estado de Tabasco de la Republica Mexicana; origen lingüístico, estructura original y significación de los nombres de lugares de Tabasco que no corresponden á la lengua castellana, 1909.
- Verdadero concepto de nuestra guerra de independencia, 1910.
- Itinerario de Hernan Cortés en Tabasco; determinación de los lugares que tocó el conquistador don Hernando Cortés a su paso por Tabasco, en su expedición a Hibueras, en 1524-1525, 1910.
- Los nombres del Palenque, 1911.
- La papaya orejona (Pileus pentaphyllus), 1921.
- La nueva gramática castellana. Cursos graduados para el estudio de la lengua castellana en las escuelas secundarias de la república, mexicana, 1921.
- Que quiere decir el nombre de Chiapas? (Estudio etimológico i geroglífico), 1922.
- Origen y significado del nombre de Yucatán, 1923.
- Palavicini desde alla abajo, 1924.
- Breve noticia sobre la lengua e indios tsoques, 1925.
- El huacalxochitl de Hernández en un petroglifo, 1925.
- Vocabulario de la lengua Chol, 1927.
- Nombres geográficos indígenas del estado de Chiapas. Catálogo alfabético, etimológico, geográfico, histórica i mitológica, de todos los nombres de lugar (poblaciones, parajes, comarcas, regiones, alturas, valles, rios, arroyos, lagunas, esteros, etc.) que estan en las lenguas nahoa, soque, chiapaneca, sotsil, sendal, chaneabal, mame, chol, maya i quiché, 1930.
- El antiguo calendario chiapaneco; estudio comparativo entre este i los calendarios precoloniales maya, quiché i nahoa, 1933.
- Crónica de Nueva España (Francisco Cervantes de Salazar; Francisco del Paso y Troncoso; Federico Goméz de Orozco; Marcos E. Becerra [editor]), 1914-1936.
- La planta llamada quapaque o paque (correa guapaque, n. gen., n. sp.; trib. Dalbergiae. fam. Fabaceae), 1936.
- En defensa del idioma maya (polémica), 1937.
- Juegos precoloniales, 1945.
- Rectificaciones y adiciones al Diccionario de la Real Academia española, 1954.

== Bibliography ==
- (English) MacCurdy, George Grant, “Seventeenth International Congress of Americanists Second Session - City of Mexico“, American Anthropologist, New Series, Vol. 12, No. 4 (Oct. - Dec., 1910), pp. 600–605.
- (Spanish) García Mora, Carlos, La Antropología en México: panorama histórico. Mexico, D.F.: Instituto Nacional de Antropología e Historia, 1987–1988.
- (Spanish) Navarrete, Carlos, Los primeros antropólogos chiapanecos: 1. Alberto Culebro, 2. Marcos E. Becerra. Mexico: Secretaría de Educación y Cultura, Gobierno del Estado de Chiapas, 1986.
- (Spanish) Santamaría, Francisco J., et al., Bibliografía general de Tabasco. Mexico: Secretaría de Relaciones Exteriores, Gobierno del Estado de Tabasco, 1930.
