= Noé de la Flor Casanova =

Mexican politician (1904–1986)

Governor of Tabasco
- In office January 1, 1943 – December 31, 1946
- Preceded by: Francisco Trujillo Gurría
- Succeeded by: Francisco Javier Santamaría

Personal details
- Born: May 29, 1904 Teapa, Tabasco
- Died: 1986 (aged 81–82) Mexico City
- Party: Partido Revolucionario Institucional
- Occupation: Lawyer

Noé de la Flor Casanova (May 29, 1904 in Teapa, Tabasco – 1986 in Mexico City) was a Mexican lawyer, cantautor, writer, poet and politician who served for four years as Governor of Tabasco, before being removed from office following a scandal.

== Life and work ==
De la Flor y Casanova was the son of Manuel de la Flor Hernández, a master tailor, and Elodia Casanova de de la Flor, the family was extremely poor. After completing primary school in Teapa he moved to Villahermosa (then called San Juan Bautista) to attend the Instituto Juárez, a preparatory school founded by Manuel Sánchez Mármol. With a scholarship, obtained for him by José Vasconcelos at the request of fellow Tabascan Carlos Pellicer, De la Flor Casanova enrolled in the National Preparatory School in Mexico City. After obtaining a law degree from the National Autonomous University of Mexico in 1930 he served in the following judicial posts: Secretary of the Criminal Courts in the Federal District from 1930 to 1936; professor at the National Law School, UNAM, 1937–46; Justice of the Peace, 1937–39; Judge of the Superior Tribunal of Justice of the Federal Territories, 1940–42, 1946–58. He was Governor of Tabasco from 1943 to 1946 and was removed from office following a scandal, the details of which remain obscure. He was also a founding member (1936) of the Socialist Lawyers Front of Mexico (Frente de abogados socialistas). He was, as a result of his writings, associated, in the minds of some, with a modern current of libertinage érudit.

== Published works ==
(list not comprehensive)

- Díaz Mirón, y otros poemas 1935
- Madre Revolución; insurgencias líricas de Noé de la Flor Casanova 1936
- Paisaje nada más 1938
- Balcón al viento 1958
- Ideario de Winston Churchill (1874-1965) 1965
- Viajando por el mundo de mis libros: reflexiones inconexas para inteligentes y para tontos 1975
- Licor del silencio: poemas 1982

== See also ==
José Gorostiza; Andrés Iduarte; Salvador Novo; Jaime Torres Bodet; Rodolfo Usigli; Xavier Villaurrutia

== Bibliography ==
- (English) Camp, Roderic Ai, Mexican political biographies, 1935-1993. The Hague: Mouton, 1993.
- (Spanish) Acosta, Marco Antonio, Nueva antología de poetas tabasqueños contemporáneos, Mexico: Univ. J. Autónoma de Tabasco, 2006.
- (Spanish) Castellanos Castilla, Gerardo, De la Flor Casanova: Isla y tierra firme. Mexico, D.F.: Editorial Cultura, 1958.
- (Spanish) Castro Leal, Antonio, La poesía mexicana moderna. Mexico: Fondo de Cultura Económica, 1953.
