= Austrian Latin America Institute =

Organization promoting dialogue between Austria and Latin America

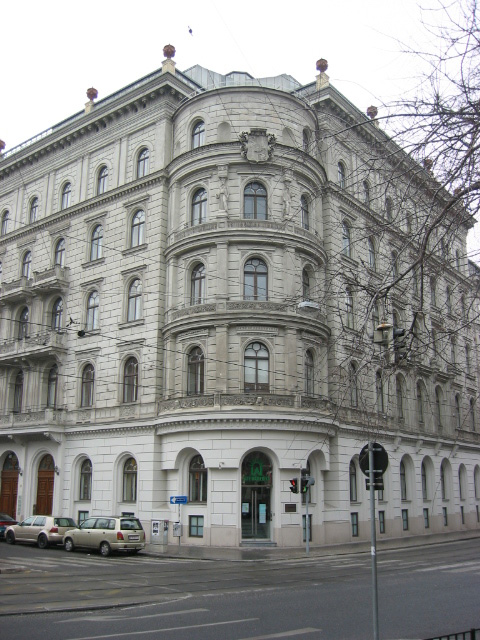
Palais Schlick in Vienna

The Austrian Latin America Institute (Österreichisches Lateinamerika-Institut, LAI) is an interdisciplinary orientated organisation, aiming at intensifying dialogue and exchange between Austria and Latin America. It was founded as an association in 1965 and receives subsidies for its work in development politics as well as scientific and cultural events and projects. About half of the annual budget originates from its own resources, mainly language courses as well as membership fees. In 1994 the institute moved to the historic Palais Schlick in Vienna's 9th district Alsergrund.

== Interdisciplinary Master Degree Programme in Latin-American Studies ==
The Austrian Latin America Institute coordinates the Interdisciplinary Master Degree Programme in Latin-American Studies (Interdisziplinärer Universitätslehrgang für Höhere Lateinamerika-Studien) in cooperation with the University of Vienna. This is the only "university level" course about Latin America in Austria. The degree is Master of Arts in Latin American studies.

== Library ==
The Austrian Latin America Institute has the only library and documentation centre in Austria specializing in Latin America. The collection focuses on specialist books and journals on economy, politics, history, culture, society and ecology of the Latin American countries. Furthermore, it has literary works by Latin American authors in Spanish and Portuguese and their translations. The library represents Austria in REDIAL.

== Language Courses ==
The Austrian Latin America Institute is Austria's largest language school for Spanish, Portuguese and Indigenous languages offering about 300 courses annually.

== Information service ==
The Austrian Latin America Institute offers information and advice to all people interested in Latin America and Latin American students in particular.

== Events ==
The event calendar includes exhibitions, book presentations, concerts, lectures and discussions.

== Austrian Study-Group for Latin-American Research ==
The Austrian Latin America Institute itself is no research institute, but it supports the Austrian Study-Group for Latin-American Research (Arbeitsgemeinschaft Österreichische Lateinamerikaforschung). The object of this association is scientific networking, interdisciplinary exchange and cooperation of researchers in Austria. It regards itself as an open forum offering young scientists the opportunity to present and discuss their work. In 2007 the Study-Group had 108 members from Austria, Europe and Latin America. The annual conference is held in Strobl am Wolfgangsee. The Study-Group was founded in 1983 by members of the Austrian Latin America Institute and is partner of CEISAL (Consejo Europeo de Investigaciones Sociales de América Latina).

== Publications ==
- Atención: Jahrbuch des Österreichischen Lateinamerika-Instituts. Yearbook with scholarly articles in German, Spanish and English
- Investigaciones: Forschungen zu Lateinamerika. Publication by the Austrian Study-Group for Latin-American Research in which master thesis and dissertations are made accessible to a wider audience

== See also ==
- Ibero-American Institute

== Literature ==
- Marcus Klein: Marcus Klein: “Latin America Studies in Austria: An Overview“, in: Revista Europea de Estudios Latinoamericanos y del Caribe (Ed. by CEDLA, University of Amsterdam), 72, April 2002.
- Gerhard Drekonja-Kornat (Ed.): Lateinamerikanistik – der österreichische Weg. LIT, Münster u. a. 2005, ISBN 3-8258-8651-4.
