= Francisco J. Santamaría =

Mexican writer and politician

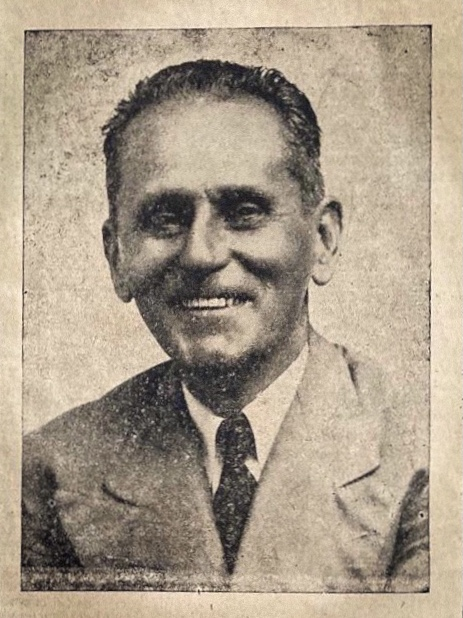
Francisco J. Santamaría

Francisco Javier Santamaría (September 10, 1886 in Cacaos in Jalapa Municipality, Tabasco – March 1, 1963 in Veracruz, Veracruz) was an influential Mexican writer and politician who is best remembered for his contributions to the study of Mexican literature and lexicography; he variously worked or published as a bibliographer, essayist, geographer, journalist, judge, lawyer, lexicographer, linguist, naturalist, pedagogue, philologist, and poet. He also served as a Senator of the Republic and as Governor of the State of Tabasco.

== Life and work ==
Francisco Javier Santamaría was born in 1886 in the ranchería of Cacaos, to a criollo family of modest means. He began his schooling in Macuspana and completed his studies in Villahermosa (then called San Juan Bautista) at the Instituto Juárez, where he graduated with a teaching degree. He subsequently moved to Mexico City to study law, obtaining his license in 1912.

Beginning at a young age Santamaría demonstrated a talent for composition and an appreciation for the belles-lettres which would eventually evolve into a prolific career as a writer, lexicographer and linguist; his two most often cited works are the Diccionario General de Americanismos and the Diccionario de Mejicanismos, the second of which is a continuation and completion of Joaquín García Icazbalceta's original project.

At the start of his political career Santamaría was an outspoken critic of Plutarco Elías Calles and the Partido Labortista over which he presided. He was also a close friend and political associate of General Francisco R. Serrano (an inveterate enemy of Calles's), and supported the latter's presidential campaign for the 1925-1928 term, an enterprise which would ultimately end in the murderous defeat of Serrano and his closest associates. Santamaría would be the only one on Elías Calles's hit list to not fall the night of October 2, 1927, an event known as the "Huitzilac Massacre," which resulted in the summary executions of Serrano and twenty six other generals, and which President Álvaro Obregón ordered out of fear of military rebellion. His escape and survival would, however, result in years of exile and poverty in the U.S., an account of which he gives in Crónicas del destierro: Desde la ciudad de hierro (Chronicles of Exile: From the Iron City).

After returning to Mexico Santamaría re-entered politics by joining the Institutional Revolutionary Party (PRI); eventually going on to serve as a Senator of the Republic for Tabasco from 1940 to 1946. Immediately after the conclusion of his term he was selected by the party as its candidate for the governorship of Tabasco, competed against three opponents and won handily, reportedly receiving 95% of the votes. As governor he worked to improve his state's educational system and general level of cultural and technological development, while continuing to write books and essays on a variety of subjects.

Francisco Javier Santamaría was a numerary member of the Academia Mexicana de la Lengua and held seat 23.

== Published works ==
(list not comprehensive)

- El artículo 91. 1912
- El periodismo tabasqueño. 1920
- Americanismos y barbarismos. 1921
- Ley orgánica de los tribunales del fuero común en el Distrito y territorios federales, con un apéndice que contiene la Ley de jurados, la Ley de licencias a funcionarios públicos y otras disposiciones. 1923
- Un valioso hallazgo bibliográfico cervantino: la segunda parte de la edición más discutible de "El quijote". 1926
- Glosa lexicográfica. 1926
- Bibliografia general de Tabasco: Tomo I. 1930
- Crónicas del destierro: Desde la ciudad de hierro. Diario de un desterrado mejicano en Nueva York. Recordaciones del destierro. 1933
- Nuevo codigo civil para el distrito y territorios federales. 1933
- Las ruinas occidentales del viejo imperio Maya: en la Sierra del Tortuguero en Macuspana, Tabasco: notas de una excursión. 1933
- Código de procedimientos civiles para el Distrito Federal y territorios: expedido el 30 de agosto de 1932. 1934
- Código civil para el Distrito y territorios federales (vigente desde el 1. de octubre de 1932). 1935
- Diccionario del Código civil para el Distrito y territorios federales. 1935
- Código civil para el Distrito y territorios federales: expedido en 30 de agosto de 1928; exposición de motivos, de la Comisión autora del Proyecto. 1935
- Ley orgánica del poder judicial de la federación. 1936
- Datos, materiales i apuntes para la historia del periodismo en Tabasco (1825–1935). 1936
- Ensayo de crítica del lenguaje. 1941
- Diccionario General de Americanismos1942
- El movimiento cultural en Tabasco. 1946
- El verdadero Grijalva : identificación i rectificación históricas-jeográficas, Centla, Potonchán, Santa María de la Victoria 1949
- La poesía tabasqueña : antología, semblanzas literarias 1950
- Documentos históricos de Tabasco. 1950-1951
- Antología folklórica y musical de Tabasco 1952
- Diccionario de mejicanismos: razonado; comprobado con citas de autoridades; comparado con el de americanismos y con los vocabularios provinciales de los más distinguidos diccionaristas hispanamericanos. 1959
- Domingos académicos. 1959

Francisco Javier Santamaría
Governor of Tabasco
| In office | January 1, 1947 - December 31, 1952 |
| Preceded by | Noé de la Flor Casanova |
| Succeeded by | Manuel Bartlett Bautista |
| Born | September 10, 1886 |
| Birth Place | Formerly Cacaos (person now its eponym), Municipality of Jalapa Tabasco |
| Died | March 1, 1963 |
| Place of Death | Veracruz, Veracruz de Ignacio de la Llave |
| Spouse | Mercedes Ortiz de Santamaría |
| Profession | Educator, lawyer, and lexicographer |
| Political Party | Partido Revolucionario Institucional (PRI) |

== See also ==
- Diccionario de la lengua española de la Real Academia Española
- Joaquín Amaro
- Marcos E. Becerra
- Andrés Bello
- Miguel Antonio Caro
- Rufino José Cuervo
- Rosario María Gutiérrez Eskildsen
- María Moliner
- Ramón Menéndez Pidal
- Meshico

== Bibliography ==
- (English) Camp, Roderic Ai, Mexican political biographies, 1935-1993. The Hague: Mouton, 1993.
- (English) Malkiel, Yakov, Linguistics and philology in Spanish America. A survey (1925-1970). Austin: University of Texas Press, 1995,
