= Ibero-American Institute =

German research institute

Coordinates: 52°30′4.33″N 13°22′9.07″E

Ibero-American Institute Ibero-Amerikanisches Institut
- Established: 1930
- Mission: cultural exchange between Germany and the Latin countries
- Director: Dr. Barbara Göbel
- Address: Potsdamer Straße 37
- Location: Berlin, Germany
- Website: http://www.iai.spk-berlin.de/

The Ibero-American Institute or IAI (German: Ibero-Amerikanisches Institut, Spanish: Instituto Ibero-Americano Patrimonio Cultural Prusiano) is an interdisciplinary institution located in Berlin, Germany, for academic and cultural exchange between Germany and Latin America, Spain, Portugal and the Caribbean. It is the largest non-university research center for Latin American Studies outside of Latin America. It also features the largest specialized library in Europe on Latin America, Spain, Portugal and the Caribbean. In addition to a large rare book collection, the IAI collects and preserves magazines, electronic documents, maps, audio media, photographs, videos, DVDs, papers and diverse additional materials. The IAI is a member of the research association CEISAL (Spanish: Consejo Europeo de Investigaciones Sociales de América Latina) and the documentation network association REDIAL. Founded in 1930, since 1962 the IAI has been an agency of the Prussian Cultural Heritage Foundation. It is located at the Kulturforum near Potsdamer Platz in Berlin-Mitte.

== History ==
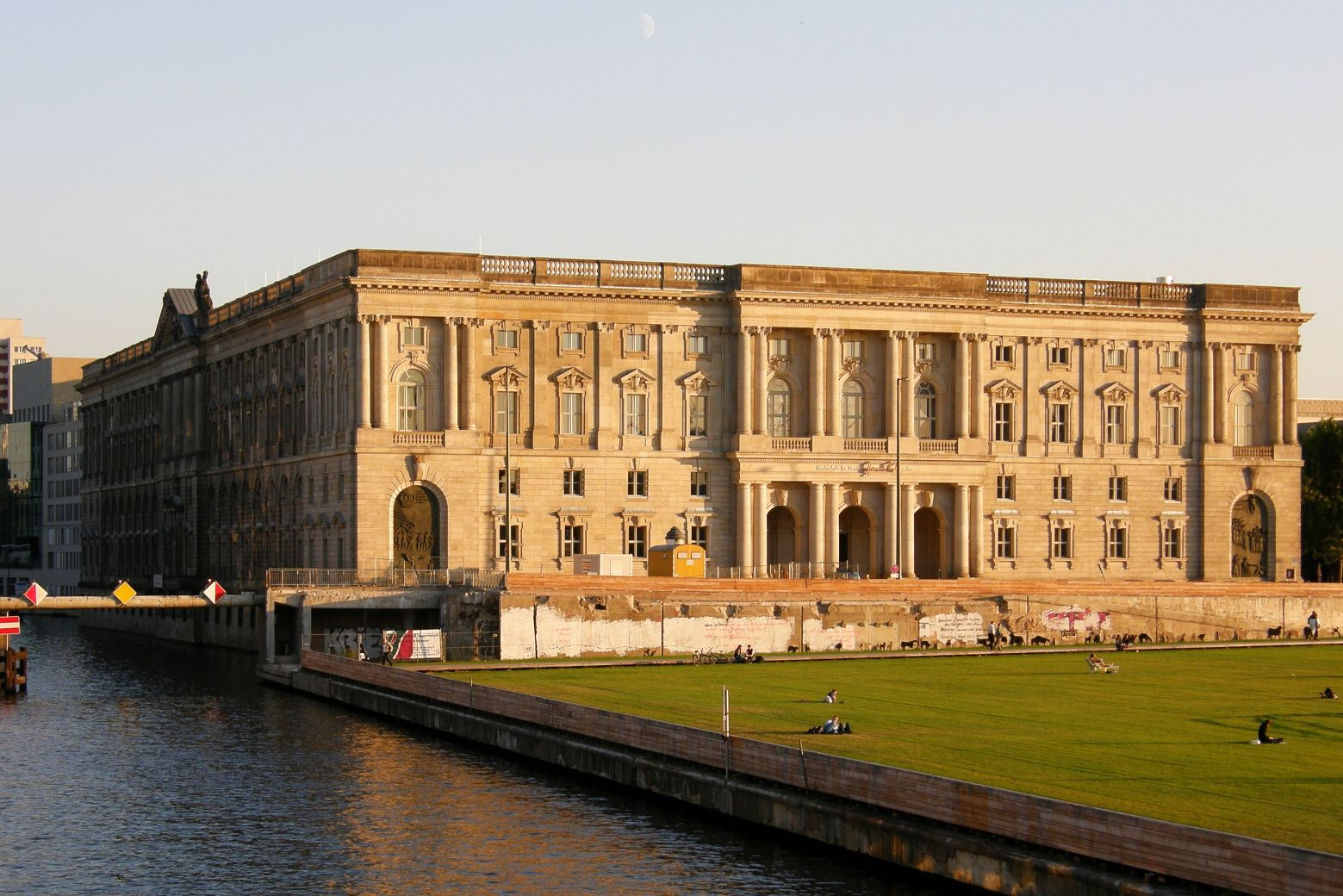
The Neuer Marstall, original home of the IAI until World War II

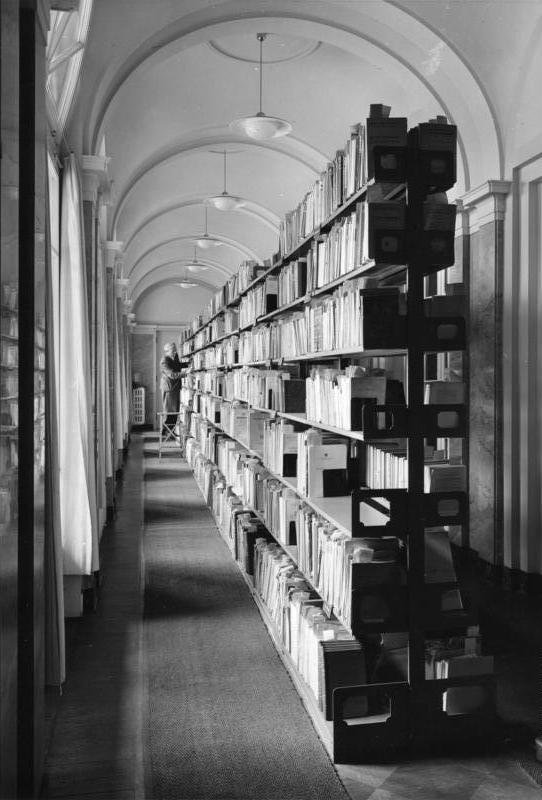
Part of the IAI collection in 1958

The institute was founded in 1930 and on a core of three large book collections. In the late 1920s, the Argentine scholar Ernesto Quesada had given his approximately 82,000-volume private library to the State of Prussia. In addition, it received the Mexico library of geographer Hermann Hagen, who had collected 25,000 volumes with the support of Mexican president Plutarco Elías Calles. When the Institute for Latin America Studies in Hamburg closed in 1930, its inventory of approximately 10,000 volumes was then transferred to the IAI. Thus by the time of its founding, the IAI was already in possession of about 120,000 volumes, a specialized and comprehensive collection that included many rare and valuable books.

Apart from the library, an essential element of the IAI was the research department. Both were initially housed in the Prussian Royal Stables building (German: Neue Marstall), a grand edifice in central Berlin-Mitte. Under the direction of Wilhelm Faupel, the Nazi envoy to rebel General Francisco Franco, the institute became integrally involved in diplomatic relations between the Third Reich, Spain and Argentina. During World War II it was moved to Berlin-Lankwitz and the books sent into storage to protect them from Allied bombing. An estimated at 40,000 volumes were lost during the war.

After the war, as a result of its Nazi activities, the institute was nearly dissolved. On 1 April 1946, the West Berlin city government took over the financing of the IAI and thus saved it. In that same year the institute was named the "Latin American Library", and in 1954 it was renamed the "Ibero-American Library". In 1957 the library came under the auspices of the Prussian Cultural Heritage Foundation. In 1962 the institution was again named the "Ibero-American Institute." In the following years one of its main tasks was to close the gaps in the collection lost during the War. Here the IAI received great support by foreign institutions, libraries and other facilities. In 1977, the IAI moved into a new building on the Kulturforum at Potsdamer Straße 37.

== Structure and function ==
Today, the IAI is composed of:

- The Library Department
- The Department of Research, Special Collections and Projects
- The Department of Central Services.

The IAI also publishes monographs and periodicals, for example the magazine Ibero-analysis with topics on the politics, economy, society and culture of the South American countries. In Ibero-Online.de appear lectures held at the IAI which can be downloaded in PDF format. Bibliographies from the IAI holdings on certain topics and numerous publications are also available online.

== Library collection ==
- Sound Archives: media including 15,000 LPs; 2,000 singles; 1,000 shellac discs; 4,500 CDs; 900 music cassettes and 1200 tapes.
- Map Collection: Latin America, the Iberian Peninsula and former Spanish and Portuguese colonies, comprising an estimated 68,550 printed and 80 hand-drawn maps and 1348 atlases.
- Picture Archive: The collection began in 1973 and contains approximately 60,000 photographs and 22,000 slides.
- Newspapers: Articles about Spain, Portugal, Latin America and the Caribbean have been collected since the founding of the IAI in 1930. The collection includes an estimated 300,000 clippings. In 1990, the collections of the GDR Institute for International Politics and Economics and the German Institute for Contemporary History (DIZ) of the GDR were added. This includes approximately 76,000 newspaper clippings from the international press. Following digitization, no physical clippings have been collected since 1999.
- Estate Collection: Includes the legacies of anthropologist Eduard Seler, archaeologist Max Uhle, and photographer Ernst Hugo Brehme. There are also special collections, for example, a graphic collection of Taller de Gráfica Popular and an extensive collection of the Brazilian Literatura de Cordel.

== Directors ==
- Otto Boelitz, 1930–1934
- Wilhelm Faupel, 1934–1936
- Albrecht Reinecke, 1936–1938
- Wilhelm Faupel, 1938–1945
- Hermann Hagen, 1947–1957
- Hans-Joachim Bock, 1957–1974
- Wilhelm Stegmann, 1975–1986
- Dietrich Briesemeister, 1987–1999
- Günther Maihold, 1999–2004
- Barbara Göbel since 2005

== See also ==
- Austrian Latin America Institute

== Literature ==
- Peter Altekrüger: Die Erweiterung der Erwerbungsstrategien einer Spezialbibliothek: Folgerungen aus der Analyse einer fachbezogenen Leihverkehrsstatistik des Ibero-Amerikanischen Instituts, Stiftung Preußischer Kulturbesitz; Hausarbeit zur Prüfung für den höheren Bibliotheksdienst. Köln, 1995
- 75 Jahre Ibero-Amerikanisches Institut Preußischer Kulturbesitz. Berlin, 2005 (auch spanische Fassung)
- Gudrun Schumacher and Gregor Wolff: Nachlässe, Manuskripte und Autographen im Besitz des IAI. (Berlin, 2004)
- Sandra Carreras: "Die Quesada-Bibliothek kommt nach Berlin : zu den Hintergründen einer Schenkung" in: Sandra Carreras/Günther Maihold (eds.): Preußen und Lateinamerika: im Spannungsfeld von Kommerz, Macht und Kultur. (Münster, 2004) p. 305–320
