= Meshico =

Meshico is a term which began to be employed in the middle of the 20th century by a group of Mexican intellectuals connected to the influential magazine Meshico Grande in order to define a philosophical and sociological stance based on an authentic ontology of the Mexican person, one that would serve, as well, as a means of confronting the dependency of the official intelligentsia on ways of thinking perceived as being too foreign to permit a true understanding of Mexican reality.

The group decided on the unusual spelling in order to differentiate itself from the official Europeanizing intelligentsia; they believed that the spelling "meshico" was historically more accurate as it reflected the original Nahuatl pronunciation of the word Mēxihco (Nahuatl pronunciation: [meːˈʃiʔko]), and, for this reason, would be an appropriate name for a group dedicated to a professedly authentic understanding of Mexican identity (Mexicanidad).

Among the many notable members of the group were Rosario María Gutiérrez Eskildsen, Manuel Sánchez Mármol, Francisco Javier Santamaría, and José Vasconcelos. The Tabascan Dr. Ricardo Alfonso Sarabia y Zorrilla was one of the group's more assiduous promoters and served for a time as director of Meshico Grande. He also contributed to a wider awareness of the group's goals and positions by writing, among other works, a paper entitled "Filosofía de la acción y reseña del pensamiento filosófico de Meshico" [Philosophy of Action and Review of the Philosophical Thinking of Meshico], which was originally published in the Proceedings of the 11th International Congress of Philosophy, Brussels 1953.

Sarabia y Zorrilla cites, in the aforementioned work, the definition of Truth given by the obscure and retiring Mexican philosopher and mathematician Edmundo Cetina Velázquez: "[it is knowledge] which corresponds to the integral unity of being; the world of thought will always reveal to us an external world, sensible or abstract; but always unilateral. 'Truth,' which is reality, is the patrimony of the totality of being." Sarabia y Zorrilla saw in such a statement a correct testimony of faith in an epistemological holism functioning in opposition to the notion of knowledge as a goal obtainable only through a scientific vision which is essentially and necessarily ontic and a posteriori (compare the avowal made by Sarabia himself in the same text: "everything is related, coordinated, linked harmoniously and amorously").

José Gómez Robleda, a teacher, psychiatrist and Subsecretary of Public Education during the Adolfo Ruiz Cortines administration, published in 1947 a book titled Imagen del Mexicano (Image of the Mexican). Sarabia y Zorrilla describes the study as "the work which for the first time studies the way of being of the Mexican man," especially in his ethnopsychological dimensions, and praises it for a vision of the human which, owing to its philosophical balance, succeeds in avoiding the worst rationalistic tendencies of Comtian Positivism, without falling into the no less problematic cosmic mysticism of José Vasconcelos (who Professor Sarabia once described, with no intended harshness, as a "philosopher-artist").

== See also ==
- Científico
- The Labyrinth of Solitude
- La Raza Cósmica
- Samuel Ramos
- Leopoldo Zea Aguilar
