= 1848–49 Colombian presidential election =

- 1848 (electoral college); March 1849 (president)
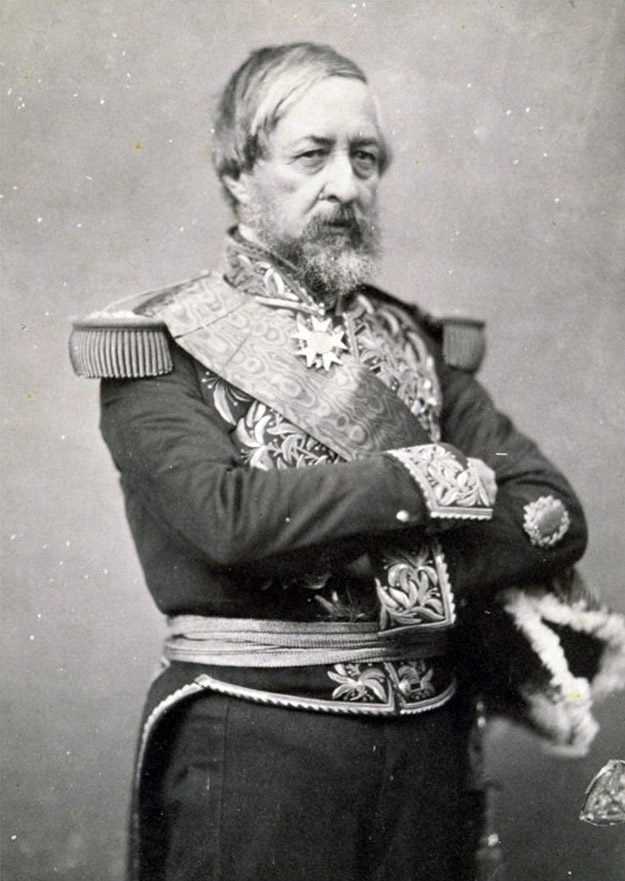

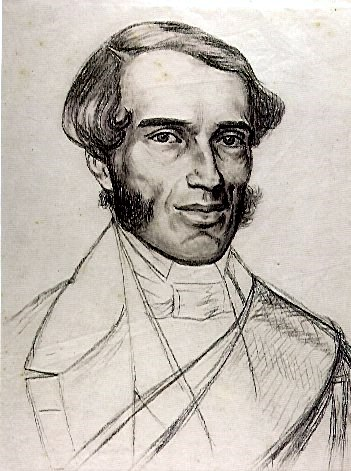
Candidate	José Hilario López	Rufino Cuervo y Barreto
Party	Liberal	Conservative
Electoral vote	45	42
President before election
Pedro Alcántara Herrán
Independent
Elected President
José Hilario López
Liberal

Presidential elections were held in the Republic of New Granada in 1848 and 1849. Members of the electoral college were elected in 1848 and subsequently convened to elect the president in March 1849. The Liberal José Hilario López was elected president with the support of the artisans and their Democratic society clubs, also taking advantage of the divisions among the Conservatives.

The election has been characterized as free and fair.

== Results ==
=== Electoral college ===
Candidate	Party	Votes	%
José Hilario López	Liberal	734	43.15
Joaquín Gori	Conservative	384	22.57
Rufino Cuervo	Conservative	304	17.87
Mariano Ospina Rodríguez		81	4.76
Joaquín Barriga		74	4.35
Florentino González		72	4.23
Eusebio Borrero		52	3.06
Total		1,701	100.00
Source: Historia electoral colombiana

=== By Congress ===
As no candidate received a majority of the electoral college vote, the president was to be elected by members of Congress from the top-three candidates in the electoral college votes, López, Gori and Cuervo, with a candidate requiring 43 votes to be elected. In a tight and controversial election, under pressure from an armed mob in the streets, López received the required 43 votes in the fourth round and was elected.

Candidate	First round		Second round		Third round		Fourth round	
Candidate	Votes	%	Votes	%	Votes	%	Votes	%
José Hilario López	37	44.05	40	47.62	42	50.00	45	53.57
Rufino Cuervo	37	44.05	41	48.81	39	46.43	39	46.43
Joaquín Gori	10	11.90						
Blank votes	0	0.00	2	2.38	3	3.57	0	0.00
Total	84	100.00	81	100.00	84	100.00	84	100.00
Source: Historia electoral colombiana, Banrepcultural
