= Redial =

Redial may refer to:

- Dialling again
- Automatic redial in telecommunication
- REDIAL (European Network of Information and Documentation on Latin America), the European organization
- Of or concerning a redia, a stage in the development of a trematode
- "Redial", a music track from the game Bomberman Hero
