= International Congress of Americanists =

International academic conference

The International Congress of Americanists (ICA) is an international academic conference for research in multidisciplinary studies of the Americas. Established August 25, 1875 in Nancy, France, the scholars' forum has met regularly since its inception, presently in three year increments, with the exception of during the conflict of World War II. Its meeting location alternates between Europe and the Americas. Congress members come from a variety of disciplines, including anthropology, archaeology, art, education, economy, geography, history, human rights, law, philosophy, linguistics, sociology, and urban studies.

Goal of the International Congress of Americanists: Contribuer au progrès des études ethnographiques, linguistiques et historiques relatives aux deux Amériques, spécialement pour les temps antérieurs à Christophe Colomb, et de mettre en rapport les personnes qui s'intéressent à ces études.

—

A wide variety of subjects have been presented at the various conferences. Father Émile Petitot spoke at the 1875 Congress on the matter of the Asiatic origin of Inuit and North American Indians. Precipitated by a comment from Franz Boas, a "lively controversy" occurred at the 1902 conference in New York City over the coined word "Amerind". At the 1910 session in Mexico City, Marcos E. Becerra presented a paper on Hernán Cortés's 1524–25 expedition to Las Hibueras. The International Work Group for Indigenous Affairs, a co-operative of academic anthropologist researchers and human rights activists, was first proposed at the Munich/Stuttgart conference in August 1968. The 1982 congress in Manchester included the largest conference ever convened on the Amazon basin. At the 1988 congress in Amsterdam, researchers organized a symposium agreeing to create a European network for the interchange of information about Latin America produced in Europe which was the precursor for REDIAL.

The president of the 53rd Congress was the Mexican anthropologist Elio Masferrer Kan. The event took place July 19–24, 2009, in Mexico City. The 54th Congress took place July 15–20, 2012 in Vienna (Austria), and was organized by the University of Vienna, the Austrian Latin America Institute and the Museum of Ethnology, Vienna. The 55th Congress was held in San Salvador, El Salvador, from July 12–17, 2015 with the theme "Conflict, Peace, and Construction of Identities in the Americas."

== Dates and locations ==
1. 1875, Nancy
2. 1877, Luxembourg
3. 1879, Brussels
4. 1881, Madrid
5. 1883, Copenhagen
6. 1886, Turin
7. 1888, Berlin
8. 1890, Paris
9. 1892, Huelva
10. 1894, Stockholm
11. 1895, Mexico City
12. 1900, Paris
13. 1902, New York
14. 1904, Stuttgart
15. 1906, Quebec
16. 1908, Vienna
17. 1910, Buenos Aires (Part 1);
  Mexico City (Part 2)
18. 1912, London
19. 1915, Washington
20. 1922, Rio de Janeiro
21. 1924, The Hague (Part 1);
  Göteborg (Part 2)
22. 1926, Rome
23. 1928, New York
24. 1930, Hamburg
25. 1932, La Plata
26. 1935, Seville
27. 1939, Mexico City (Part 1);
  Lima (Part 2)
28. 1947, Paris
29. 1949, New York
30. 1952, Cambridge
31. 1954, São Paulo
32. 1956, Copenhagen
33. 1958, San Jose de Costa Rica
34. 1960, Vienna
35. 1962, Mexico City
36. 1964, Madrid–Barcelona–Seville
37. 1966, Mar del Plata
38. 1968, Stuttgart–Munich
39. 1970, Lima
40. 1972, Rome–Geneve
41. 1974, Mexico City
42. 1976, Paris
43. 1979, Vancouver
44. 1982, Manchester
45. 1985, Bogota
46. 1988, Amsterdam
47. 1991, New Orleans
48. 1994, Stockholm–Göteborg
49. 1997, Quito
50. 2000, Warsaw
51. 2003, Santiago de Chile
52. 2006, Seville
53. 2009, Mexico City
54. 2012, Vienna
55. 2015, San Salvador, El Salvador
56. 2018, Salamanca
57. 2023, Foz do Iguaçu
58. 2025, Novi Sad
