= Bert Hoffmann =

German political scientist

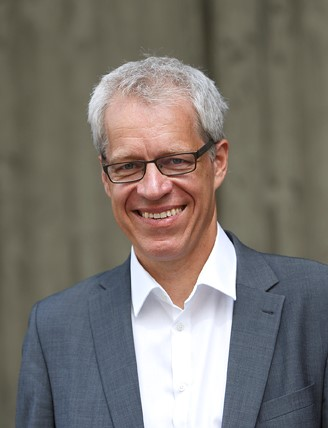
Image of Bert Hoffmann

Bert Hoffmann (born February 6, 1966 in Berlin) is a German political scientist at the German Institute of Global and Area Studies (GIGA) in Hamburg. He is an honorary professor at the Free University of Berlin, and vice-President of CEISAL (European Council for the Social Sciences of Latin America).

== Academic career ==
Bert Hoffmann studied political science at the Free University of Berlin, where he also completed his doctorate with a dissertation on "The Politics of the Internet in Third World Development". From 1993 to 1998 he was a research fellow at the Institute for Ibero-American Studies in Hamburg (today's name: GIGA Institute of Latin American Studies), from 1998 to 2003 at the Institute for Latin American Studies at the Free University of Berlin, and since 2003 again at the GIGA in Hamburg. In 2007, he was a visiting scholar at Nuffield College, Oxford University, and a guest lecturer at the Free University of Berlin as part of the SFB 700 "Governance in Areas of Limited Statehood". At the GIGA, Hoffmann led the conversion of the institute's journals into open access journals. In 2014, he was appointed honorary professor at the Free University of Berlin. From 2015 to 2025 he headed the Berlin office of the GIGA. From 2011 to 2014 and again from 2023 to 2025 he was head of the GIGA Institute of Latin American Studies. From 2023 to 2025 he was President and since 2025 vice-President of CEISAL (European Council for the Social Sciences of Latin America). Hoffmann researches political and social developments in Latin America. He has written a political study of Cuba as well as numerous essays on its political, economic and social development. Among other things, he analyzes Fidel Castro's replacement as head of state in 2006 as a transition from "charismatic socialism" to "bureaucratic socialism" under his successor and brother Raúl Castro, who promises gradual economic reforms and greater administrative efficiency. In a recent study on the prospects for German-Cuban relations in culture and education, Hoffmann emphasizes the diversity of social actors who have established a dense network of contacts and cooperation with the island from Germany, even if state cooperation remains difficult, as Cuba's rejection of the establishment of a Goethe-Institut in Havana in 2016 showed. In a research project together with Katrin Hansing, he investigated the emergence of new social inequalities on the island. The empirical survey of over 1,000 Cubans in all parts of the country shows a clear disadvantage for Afro-Cubans, who have much less access to remittances from emigrated relatives and therefore have hardly any capital to set up lucrative businesses in the emerging private sector. In addition, they also have fewer properties or houses from before the revolution, which are essential for establishing bed & breakfasts, restaurants or cab services. In this respect, the social structure of emigration after 1959, in which predominantly the better-off, mostly "white" middle and upper classes left the country, is once again contributing to a restratification of Cuban society along the lines of origin and skin color.

In the course of the COVID-19 pandemic, Bert Hoffmann has examined the social and political impact of the crisis in Latin America and the Caribbean. With a view to ecological historiography, he has also described the paramount importance of infectious diseases, above all yellow fever, for the political development of Latin America and the Caribbean up to the early 20th century. In particular, he points out the extent to which these epidemics have been suppressed from collective memory and hardly feature in mainstream historiography. Bert Hoffmann is currently involved in the DAAD-funded German-Latin American Center of Infection & Epidemiology Research & Training (GLACIER) and is leading a comparative study on COVID-19 vaccination policy in Mexico, Cuba and the six Central American countries

Hoffmann's other research topics include the political implications of digital media; the conceptual debate on comparative area studies; and the changing relationships between states and their citizens who have emigrated abroad. A research project led by him has comparatively examined the emigrant policies of all Latin American states. Hoffmann is a member of the advisory boards of the academic journal European Review of Latin American and Caribbean Studies and a member of the board of trustees of the Heidelberg Center for Ibero-American Studies (HCIAS), 2023 – 2026. He is also Honorary Research Fellow at The University of the West Indies, Sir Arthur Lewis Institute of Social and Economic Studies (SALISES), Mona Campus (Jamaica), 2023 – 2027.

== Publications ==
=== Books ===
- Hoffmann, Bert (ed.): Social Policies and Institutional Reform in Post-COVID Cuba; Opladen: Verlag Barbara Budrich, 2021. ISBN 978-3-8474-2546-5 - Full text as PDF (Spanish version)
- Havanna. Im Herzen Kubas (Fotos: Sven Creutzmann). Verlag Frederking und Thaler, München 2019, 320 S. ISBN 978-3-95416-286-4
- Emigrant Policies in Latin America and the Caribbean (with Luicy Pedroza and Pau Palop). Santiago de Chile: FLASCO Chile 2016 ISBN 978-956-205-257-3 Full text as PDF
- Wandel und Annäherung: Perspektiven deutsch-kubanischer Beziehungen in Kultur und Bildung. Stuttgart: Institut für Auslandsbeziehungen 2016; ISBN 978-3-921970-50-8 PDF
- Kuba. München: C. H. Beck, 3., überarb. Aufl. 2009; ISBN 978-3-406-44787-7
- Debating Cuban Exceptionalism (zus. mit Laurence Whitehead). New York/London: Palgrave, 2007; ISBN 978-1-4039-8075-5
- Wirtschaftsreformen in Kuba. Konturen einer Debatte; Frankfurt/M.: Vervuert (Schriftenreihe des Instituts für Iberoamerika-Kunde Band 38) 1994 (2. Aufl. 1996); ISBN 978-3-89354-238-3
- Cuba. Apertura y reforma económica. Perfil de un debate. Caracas: Nueva Sociedad 1995; ISBN 978-980-317-073-8
- The Politics of the Internet in Third World Development. Challenges in Contrasting Regimes with Case Studies of Costa Rica and Cuba. New York: Routledge, 323p., 2004; ISBN 978-0-415-65097-7
- Internet und Politik in Lateinamerika. Regulierung und Nutzung der Neuen Informations- und Kommunikationstechnologien im Kontext der politischen und wirtschaftlichen Transformationen (zus. mit Roman Herzog und Markus Schulz). Frankfurt / M.: Vervuert; 2002, ca. 500 S.; ISBN 978-3-89354-602-2
- Jahrbuch Lateinamerika Analysen und Berichte, Band 17–28 (1993–2004), Horlemann Verlag, ab Bd. 24 Westfälisches Dampfboot. Overview

=== Essays (selection) ===
- Erschöpfte Revolution. Kuba 60 Jahre nach der Raketenkrise; in: Aus Politik und Zeitgeschichte, 72. Jahrgang, 39/2022, 26. September 2022, S. 4–10 (Fulltext Open Access)
- Repressed memory: Rethinking the impact of Latin America’s forgotten pandemics; in: European Review of Latin American and Caribbean Studies (109), 203–211 (Fulltext Open Access)
- When Racial Inequalities Return: Assessing the Restratification of Cuban Society 60 Years After Revolution (with Katrin Hansing); in: Latin American Politics and Society vol. 62, no. 2 (summer 2020), p. 29–52. (Fulltext Open Access)
- Assessing the Political and Social Impact of the COVID-19 Crisis in Latin America (mit Merike Blofield und Mariana Llanos); GIGA Focus Latin America | Number 3 | April 2020 Fulltext
- Bureaucratic socialism in reform mode: the changing politics of Cuba’s post-Fidel era, in: Third World Quarterly, 37, 9(2016), 1730–1744
- Communicating Authoritarian Elite Cohesion(with Andreas Schedler), in: Democratization, 23, 1 (2016), 93–117
- The international dimension of authoritarian regime legitimation: insights from the Cuban case, in: Journal of International Relations and Development, 18 (2015), 556–574
- Latin America and Beyond: The Case for Comparative Area Studies, in: European Review of Latin American and Caribbean Studies, 100, (2015), 111–120
- What do they know of England who only England know? Vergleichende Regionalforschung als Schlüsselkompetenz in einer verflochtenen Welt (zus. mit Barbara Fritz), in: Markus Hochmüller et al. (ed.), Politik in verflochtenen Räumen / Los espacios entrelazados de lo político. Festschrift für Marianne Braig, Berlin: Verlag Walter Frey / edition tranvía 2013, p. 156–170 ISBN 978-3-938944-79-0
- Area Studies (mit Andreas Mehler) in: Bertrand Badie / Dirk Berg-Schlosser / Leonardo Morlino (eds.), International Encyclopedia of Political Science, Newbury: Sage, 86–89 ISBN 978-1-4129-5963-6
- Kuba: Auf dem Weg zum Marktsozialismus?, GIGA Focus Lateinamerika, 09/2010, Hamburg: GIGA Fulltext
- Turning the Symbol Around: Returning Guantánamo Bay to Cuba, in: Abraham F. Lowenthal / Theodore Piccone / Laurence Whitehead (eds.), The Obama Administration and the Americas. Agenda for Change, Washington D.C.: The Brookings Institution, 2009, p. 136–144; ISBN 978-0-8157-0309-9
- Civil Society 2.0?: How the Internet Changes State-Society Relations in Authoritarian Regimes: The Case of Cuba, GIGA Working Paper, No. 156, January 2011, Hamburg: GIGA Fulltext
- Bringing Hirschman Back In: “Exit”, “Voice”, and “Loyalty” in the Politics of Transnational Migration, in: The Latin Americanist, 54 (2010) 2, p. 57–73
- Charismatic Authority and Leadership Change: Lessons from Cuba's Post-Fidel Succession, in: International Political Science Review, 30 (2009) 3, p. 229–248
- Why Reform Fails: The ‘Politics of Policies’ in Costa Rican Telecommunications Liberalization, in: European Review of Latin American and Caribbean Studies, 84 (2008) p. 3–19
