= Rosario María Gutiérrez Eskildsen =

Mexican lexicographer, linguist, educator, and poet (1899–1979)

Rosa María Gutiérrez Eskildsen
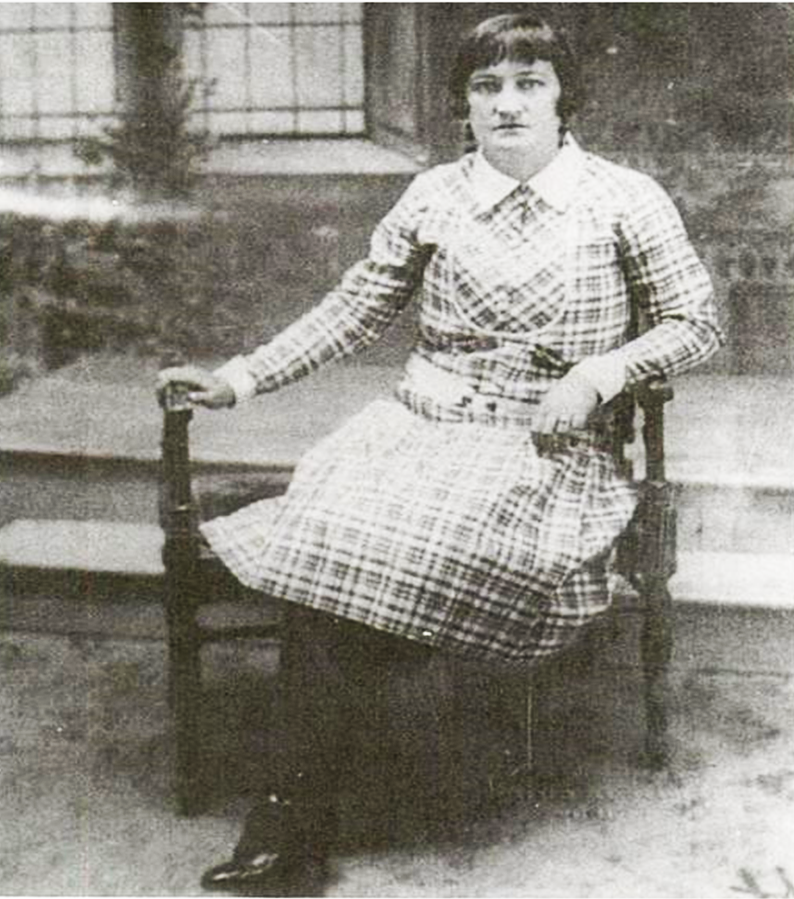
- Born: María del Rosario Gutiérrez Eskildsen; 16 April 1899; Villahermosa, Tabasco, Mexico
- Died: 12 May 1979 (aged 80); Mexico City, Mexico
- Occupations: Lexicographer, linguist, author

María del Rosario Gutiérrez Eskildsen (16 April 1899 – 12 May 1979) was a Mexican lexicographer, linguist, educator, and poet who is remembered for her studies on the regional peculiarities of speech in her home state of Tabasco as well as for her pioneering work as a teacher and pedagogue in Tabasco and throughout Mexico. She has at times been described as Tabasco's first woman "professionist".

The community of María del Rosario Gutiérrez Eskildsen in Centla Municipality, Tabasco, is named in her honor.

== Early life and education ==
She was born in Villahermosa (then known as San Juan Bautista) on what was then called Calle Grijalva, her parents were Antonio Gutiérrez Carriles, a Spaniard, and Juana Eskildsen Cáceres de Gutiérrez, a native of Campeche of Danish descent.

She was orphaned at a young age when first her mother, and then her father, died; two of her five brothers would die young as well. In order to keep financially afloat, her sister María del Carmen gave piano lessons, while Rosario, along with her older brother Guillermo, sold copies of the local newspaper El correo de Tabasco on street corners, for which they earned about 10 centavos a day.

Gutiérrez Eskildsen was a dedicated student throughout her schooling, the first part of which she concluded at the Instituto Juárez of Villahermosa, an advanced preparatory school founded by politician and educator Manuel Sánchez Mármol. In 1918, at the age of 19, she moved to Mexico City in order to continue her studies, during the day working as a primary school teacher and during the evening attending classes at the Universidad Nacional Autónoma de México, from which she would obtain an M.A. in Spanish Literature and later a doctorate in Spanish linguistics.

It was during this time that she succeeded in winning Barnard College's Lillian Emma Kimball Graduate Fellowship for Spanish studies at Columbia University.

== Career ==
Gutiérrez Eskildsen would go on to write more than a dozen books and many more articles on topics pertaining to grammar and linguistics in general, and dialectology, language pedagogy, phonetics, and prosody, in particular.

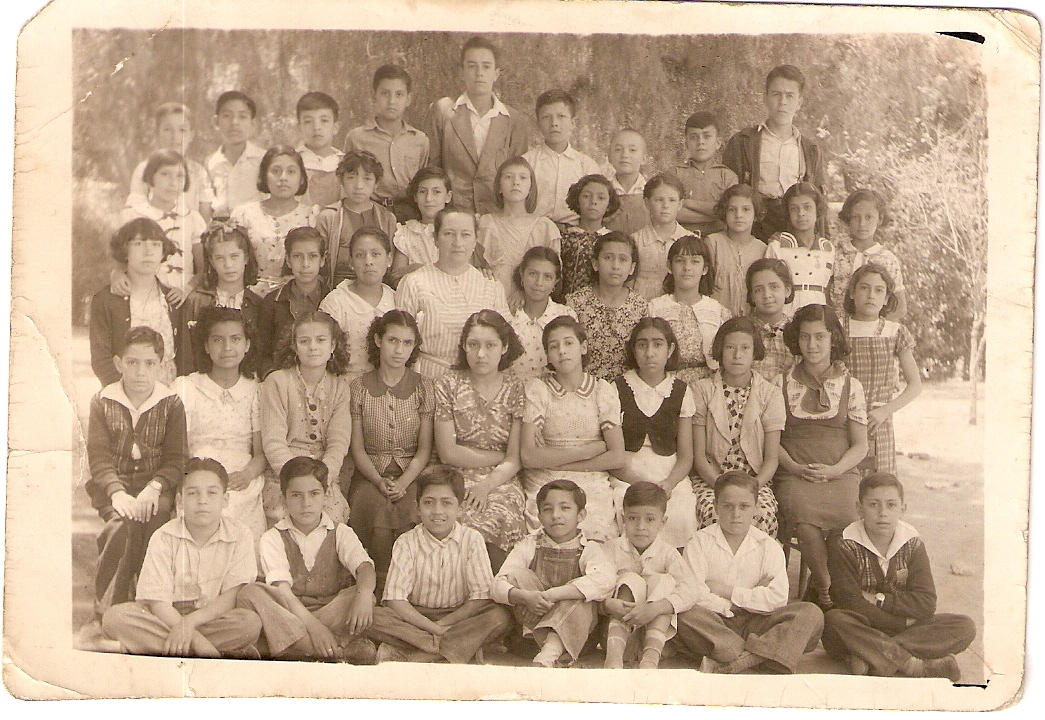
Rosario Gutierrez Eskildsen with a Primary school group in Mexico City, circa 1934

Gutiérrez Eskildsen never married, explaining, whenever asked, that her desire was to dedicate her life exclusively to her investigative and educational work. Nevertheless, she unexpectedly became the (adoptive) mother of a 17-year-old newly-orphaned teacher, Sergio Gómez Cabello, whose unhappy situation she learned about in 1953 while visiting the elementary school where he taught.

She died in Mexico City in 1979, aged 80, and was buried alongside her brother, Guillermo.

== Selected works ==
- Prosodia y fonética de Tabasco. 1934
- El habla popular y campesina de Tabasco. 1941
- Héroes civiles y mexicanos notables. 1950
- Segundo curso de lengua y literatura españolas: (unidades de trabajo). 1962
- Primer curso de español, unidades de trabajo. 1966
- Cartilla para enseñar española. 1971
- Introducción a la gramática estructural: para uso de los maestros de primeria y primer grado de enseñanza media. 1974
- Información gramatical; sexto año primaria. 1974
- Segundo curso de español; unidades de trabajo. 1974
- Español, primer curso de enseñanza media, unidades por objetivos: conforme a los nuevos programas de la reforma educativa. 1976
- Español, segundo curso de enseñanza media, unidades por objetivos: conforme a los nuevos programas de la reforma educativa.1976
- Substrato y superestrato del español de Tabasco. 1978
- Cómo hablamos en Tabasco y otros trabajos. 1981

== See also ==
- Diccionario de la lengua española de la Real Academia Española
- Andrés Bello
- Alfonso Caso
- Miguel Antonio Caro
- Rufino José Cuervo
- Joaquín García Icazbalceta
- Andrés Iduarte
- María Moliner
- Ramón Menéndez Pidal
- Meshico

== Bibliography ==
- Leavitt, Sturgis E., "Theses Dealing with Hispano-American Language and Literature -- 1943", Hispania, Vol. 27, No. 2 (May, 1944), pp. 163–166.
- Delaval, Alicia, Vida y obra de la doctora Rosario María Gutiérrez Eskildsen. Tabasco: Secur, 1986.
- Chumacero, Rosalía, Perfil y pensamiento de la mujer mexicana. Mexico: Edición De La Aurora, 1961.
- Ocampo de Gómez, Aurora Maura, Diccionario de escritores mexicanos, siglo XX : desde las generaciones del Ateneo y novelistas de la Revolución hasta nuestros días. Mexico: Universidad Nacional Autónoma de México, Instituto de Investigaciones Filológicas, Centro de Estudios Literarios, 1988
