= XHUJAT-FM =

Radio station in Villahermosa, Tabasco, Mexico

Radio UJAT (XHCPEK-FM)
Villahermosa, Tabasco; Mexico
- Frequency: 96.1 MHz

Programming
- Format: University radio

Ownership
- Owner: Universidad Juárez Autónoma de Tabasco
- Sister stations: XHUJAT-TDT

History
- First air date: January 19, 2011
- Former call signs: XHUJAT-FM (2011–2023); XHCPEK-FM (January–February 2023)
- Former frequencies: 107.3 MHz (2011–2023)
- Call sign meaning: [Universidad Juárez Autónoma de Tabasco

Technical information
- Class: A
- ERP: 3 kW

Links
- Website: radio.ujat.mx

XHUJAT-FM, known as Radio UJAT, is a radio station owned by the Universidad Juárez Autónoma de Tabasco in Villahermosa, Tabasco, Mexico.

== History ==
The station was permitted as XHUJAT-FM 107.3 on January 19, 2011.

A failure to timely renew the 12-year concession led the Federal Telecommunications Institute (IFT) to issue a new one, with call sign XHCPEK-FM, effective January 18, 2023, at which time Radio UJAT moved. The new concession specified 96.1 MHz; 107.3 was not reawarded because, in 2014, Article 90 of the new Federal Telecommunications and Broadcasting Law designated 106–108 MHz as a reserved band for community and indigenous stations. The IFT reawarded the XHUJAT-FM call sign to the new concession on February 23, 2023.
