= Caro and Cuervo Institute =

Instituto Caro y Cuervo
- Caro and Cuervo Institute

Agency overview
- Formed: 25 August 1942
- Headquarters: Calle 10 # 4-69 Bogotá, D.C., Colombia
- Annual budget: COP$7,668,382,909 (2011); COP$8,597,163,672 (2012); COP$10,081,710,055 (2013)
- Agency executive: Director
- Parent agency: Ministry of Culture
- Website: www.caroycuervo.gov.co

The Caro and Cuervo Institute (Spanish: Instituto Caro y Cuervo) is an educative centre specialising in Spanish literature, philology and linguistics, with a focus on research and promotion of reading in Colombia. The institute produces editions of Colombian authors and promotes the preservation of the national literary heritage. The institute was named after two well-known Colombian linguists, former President Miguel Antonio Caro Tobar and Rufino José Cuervo Urisarri.

The institute was created by order of the Colombian government in 1942. Its first assignment was the creation of the Spanish language dictionary, Diccionario de Construcción y Régimen de la Lengua Castellana.

Caro y Cuervo has been recognised and accoladed several times, receiving important prizes such as the Prince of Asturias Awards and the Bartolomé de las Casas Prize.
