= XHUJAT-TDT =

University TV station in Villahermosa, Tabasco, Mexico

Villahermosa, Tabasco; Mexico
- Channels: Digital: 35 (UHF); Virtual: 35
- Branding: TV UJAT

Ownership
- Owner: Universidad Juárez Autónoma de Tabasco
- Sister stations: XHUJAT-FM

History
- Founded: August 6, 2015
- First air date: November 7, 2016
- Call sign meaning: Universidad Juárez Autónoma de Tabasco

Technical information
- Licensing authority: CRT
- ERP: 39.34 kW
- Transmitter coordinates: 18°00′30″N 92°55′38″W

Links
- Website: ujat.tv

XHUJAT-TDT is a television station in Villahermosa, Tabasco. It broadcasts on channel 35 and is owned and operated by the Universidad Juárez Autónoma de Tabasco.

== History ==
XHUJAT received its concession on August 6, 2015, making it the first university television station in southeastern Mexico.

The station was expected to launch in June or July 2016 with an initial budget of 25 million pesos. The station would initially produce four programs with the others coming from other university television stations in Mexico, according to reports around the time of the concession award.

In late October 2016, XHUJAT turned on its transmitter, located on the university campus. The station launched on November 7.
