= Rufino Cuervo y Barreto =

Colombian politician (1801–1853)

Rufino Cuervo
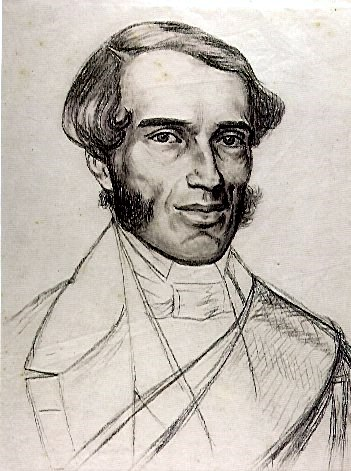

Presidential Designate of the New Granada
- In office 14 August 1847 – 14 December 1847
- President: Tomás Cipriano de Mosquera
- Preceded by: Tomás Cipriano de Mosquera
- Succeeded by: Tomás Cipriano de Mosquera

7th Vice President of New Granada
- In office 1 April 1845 – 1 April 1851
- President: Tomás Cipriano de Mosquera
- Preceded by: Joaquín Gori
- Succeeded by: José de Obaldía

Personal details
- Born: 28 July 1801 Tibiritá, Tunja Province, Viceroyalty of New Granada, Spanish Empire
- Died: 21 November 1853 (aged 52) Bogotá, Province of Bogotá, New Granada
- Party: Conservative Party
- Children: Rufino José Cuervo
- Education: Del Rosario University

Rufino Cuervo y Barreto (Tibiritá, Tunja Province, Viceroyalty of New Granada, Spanish Empire, 28 July 1801 — Bogotá, Province of Bogotá, New Granada, 21 November 1853) was a Grenadine politician, lawyer and journalist.

== Biography ==
He studied at the Universidad del Rosario, where he obtained a doctorate in civil and canon law.

After finishing his studies, he joined public office as an official in the Treasury Department and then as a parliamentarian and political leader of Bogotá. During the presidency of Pedro Alcántara Herrán he was secretary of the treasury and ambassador to Ecuador.

Cuervo participated in the writing of the newspaper La Miscelánea (founded in 1825), collaborated in La Bandera Tricolor, in opposition to Simón Bolívar (1826); He also defended the centralist side in El Constitucional de Popayán (1828). Later he directed El Cultivador Cundinamarqués, "Newspaper of the agricultural industry and domestic economy," which sought to popularize agricultural knowledge.

Cuervo was a candidate in the presidential elections of 1845, occupying the third place. Although Congress, which had to define the election as there was no candidacy with an absolute majority, chose him as vice president, and General Tomás Cipriano de Mosquera as president. Between April to May and 14 August to 14 December 1847, he held the presidency of the republic, in the absence of General Mosquera.

In 1849, he presented his candidacy for the presidential elections of that year, again he was third, but again the final decision passed to Congress, so that he could choose between the three candidates with the most support. The candidacies of General José Hilario López (liberal), former minister Joaquín Gori and that of Cuervo (both conservatives) were considered by Congress and finally, after a close dispute between Lopistas and Corvistas (the Goristas dissolved), López was elected. Cuervo, that same month, before the inauguration of José Hilario López, held the position of president again for one day on 31 March.

From the 1820s until his last days he dedicated himself to journalism. Married to Mrs. María Francisca Urisarri y Tordecillas, two of his children were part of the political (Antonio Basilio) and cultural (Rufino José) history of the country. Cuervo died on 21 November 1853, in Bogotá, and was buried in the city's Central Cemetery.
