= Minerva Bloom =

Mexican poet

- Born: 1959 (age 66–67); Tinguindin, Michoacán

Minerva Bloom was a bilingual poet and nature photographer born in 1959 in Tinguindin, Michoacán a small town nestled in the Sierra Madre Mountains of Mexico. She became a citizen of the US, and wrote poetry both in English and her native Spanish language. She lived in the state of Florida.

Minerva Bloom published books of photography, poetry, and naval history, and contributed for several international poetry and art anthologies. In the years 1999 and 2000 she worked with Nobel Prize candidate Marcia Theophilo in the translation of selected poems. Her nature photography has been chosen by several international poetry authors for their book covers. On the Internet, her contributions can be found at several journals and literary zines dedicated to the art of haiga and haiku.

Minerva Bloom died February 20, 2018.
