= Sergio Witz =

Mexican poet (born 1962)

Sergio Witz Rodríguez (born 1962 in Campeche, Campeche) is a Mexican poet. His literary work has been recognized by Mexico's National Fund for Culture and Arts (FONCA), a government agency that promotes the arts and culture by funding promising talents.

Witz was the winner of the 1994 Tabasco Poetry Prize. He is the author of "Como hierba ardiente," "Ciudad de paso" and "Mi odio por los barcos." The opinion has been expressed that his writing follows the tradition of the "poètes maudits" such as Charles Baudelaire in France and Charles Bukowski in the United States.

In 2002, he published a brief poem titled "La patria entre mierda" ("The Motherland among the Shit"), in which he expressed a desire to use the flag of Mexico as lavatory paper. Because of the controversy caused by this poem, the Attorney General decided to proceed with a prosecution and filed federal charges against Witz for the crime of "insulting national symbols." An amparo relief filing he lodged with the Supreme Court was dismissed on October 5, 2005, allowing the prosecution to proceed. On May 7, 2008, a federal court in Campeche found him guilty and, ignoring the public prosecutor's request that a custodial sentence be imposed, ordered him to pay a fine of $50 (€3.10, US$4.75).
