= Aquacultural engineering =

Aquacultural engineering is a multidisciplinary field of engineering and that aims to solve technical problems associated with farming aquatic vertebrates, invertebrates, and algae. Common aquaculture systems requiring optimization and engineering include sea cages, ponds, and recirculating systems. The design and management of these systems is based on their production goals and the economics of the farming operation.

Aquaculture technology is varied with design and development requiring knowledge of mechanical, biological and environmental systems along with material engineering and instrumentation. Furthermore, engineering techniques often involve solutions borrowed from wastewater treatment, fisheries, and traditional agriculture.

Aquacultural engineering has played a role in the expansion of the aquaculture industry, which now accounts for half of all seafood products consumed in the world. To identify effective solutions the discipline is combined with both fish physiology and business economics knowledge.

== Recirculating aquaculture systems ==
Recirculating aquaculture systems often involve intensive, high-density culture of a species with limited water usage and extensive filtration. In a typical recirculating aquaculture system, a series of filtration steps maintains a high level of water quality that promotes rapid fish growth. Steps include solids removal, biofiltration, oxygenation, and pumping, with each one requiring different equipment and engineering considerations. Comprehensive instrumentation and sensor controls are required to monitor this equipment and the underlying water conditions such as temperature, dissolved oxygen, and pH. Development of recirculating aquaculture systems remains an active area of research, with continuing engineering advances needed to make the systems economically viable for culturing a wider range of species.

== Research ==
The Journal of Aquacultural Engineering publishes engineers' studies related to the design and development of aquacultural systems. Worldwide, universities provide aquacultural engineering education often under the umbrella of agricultural or biological engineering.

== See also ==
- Recirculating aquaculture systems
