= Josefa Murillo =

Mexican poet

- Born: Josefa Murillo Carlín; 20 February 1860; Tlacotalpan, Veracruz, Mexico
- Died: 1 September 1898 (aged 38); Tlacotalpan, Veracruz, Mexico
- Education: Autodidact
- Occupation: Poet
- Writing career
- Period: Late 19th century
- Literary movement: Romanticism

Josefa Murillo (born Josefa Murillo Carlín; 20 February 1860 – 1 September 1898), was a Mexican poet influenced by the Romantics. She was nicknamed La Musa del Papaloapan ("The Muse from Papaloapan River") by the press and critics from the period. Since the age of 15 she published her poetry in newspapers such as El dictamen, El correo de Sotavento, La voz de Sotavento, and La voz de Tlacotalpan. Some of her pen names were "Xóchitl", "Tololoche", and "Matusalén".

== Life ==
Murillo was born in her family's home, located next to the Papaloapan River in Veracruz where her family had resided since colonial times. Her parents were Mariano Murillo and Manuela Carlin. She was the second of eight siblings. She remained single as a result of the death of her suitor Lorenzo de la Puente Aguirre, who was stricken by a fever that caused him a rapid death in just three days. Due to the asthma that Murillo suffered, she was unable to properly attend school and for that she received her first lyrical teachings from two paternal aunts, and subsequently became an autodidact and learned various languages. At this point in her life she used to read many Romantic writers both national and international such as Victor Hugo and Alphonse de Lamartine.

She wrote her first poetic works when she was 15 years old under the pen name "Xóchitl". She was a self-taught polyglot and learned Zapotec from the sugarcane workers who were staying at her father's house. She learned English, French and Latin from books in her father's library.

== Work ==
In general, Josefa Murillo's work has been read as poetry of love and nostalgic theme, although part of what characterizes it is the irony with which she presents gender roles. The place of spectators that the world attributed to women from the time it makes its ability to observe details sharpen, and therefore become people with a sharp look, resulting in, on many occasions, satirical texts and social criticism. The latter can be seen in her poems "Galán de día" and "Indecisión". Like many other Romantics, Josefa Murillo's poetry includes themes that refer to emotional moods and also to metaphysical concerns, such as life, death, the transience of time, and eternity.

Another theme that is included in Murillo's work is the opposition between man and nature; describing man with dyes of vitality, strength, unconsciousness and irrationality and the second as a rational entity, with limitations and conscience. After a year of Murillo's death, that is, in 1899, Cayetano Rodríguez Beltrán organized a National Tribute where the poet's artistic production was praised. In it some of the most important contemporary personages of the medium participated such as Justo Sierra, Amado Nervo, José María Vigil and Luis G. Urbina. Despite this effort, her work was not collected until 1927 and published until 1961.

Some analysts of her work, such as César Gómez Cañedo, say that the geographical isolation of the poet significantly influenced her work (not in a negative manner), but enriched it because intellectually speaking, Murillo was not at all in isolation or seclusion. The truth is that Josefa Murillo always wanted to leave the paternal house although she never succeeded, and even sent a letter to Benito Juárez where she requested to force her father, Mr. Murillo, to let her leave Tlacotalpan. There is another version that ensures that the letter was not written precisely with the goal of leaving her father's house, but that he asked the president for support to continue her studies because the detention and her status as a woman made this desire difficult.

Leonardo Pasquel says that probably because of her isolation, Murillo had enough time to read many authors whose influence can be seen in her poetry such as Hienrich Heine, Bécquer and even Salvador Díaz Mirón to whom she dedicates her only tribute through a sonnet. The relationship of Murillo's work with that of Bécquer was one of the features that were most strongly reported in the National Tribute, at which time the author was paid more attention. Antonio de la Peña y Reyes places the poet within the Mexican canonical assessment of the time.

== Critical reception ==
The poetry of Josefa Murillo had a reception that interpreted it as coming from a painful and fragile woman, who remained in permanent home confinement and isolation. For this life that Murillo led many of the interpretations to her works celebrate the elevation and delicacy of her feminine poetry, for being also a tragic woman in love (since her fiancé died).
