= Efrén Núñez Mata =

Mexican Poet

Efrén Núñez Mata (El Barrio, Juchitán de Zaragoza, Oaxaca, 9 July 1890 – Mexico City 17 August 1974) was a Mexican medical doctor, teacher, poet, writer and academic.

== Biography ==
He traveled to Mexico City to enter the Escuela Libre de Homeopatia de Mexico. After graduating as a homeopathic physician, he studied at the Normal School Superior to be a teacher. He Studied psychology, philology, comparative grammar, literature and Latin. He taught in secondary schools at Madero de Puebla and at the Escuela Nacional de Maestros. He was inspector and head of teaching in primary schools for parts of Mexico. He later was the director of the Escuela Nacional de Maestros and also of the Alfabetización y Educación Extraescolar. He was appointed professor at the National Autonomous University of Mexico (UNAM). He also worked for several newspapers and magazines, such as El Universal and its section “Libros e ideas”, El Universal Ilustrado, El Nacional and its cultural section Revista de Revistas, Historia Mexicana, El Heraldo de México, Luminar and others.

On 10 June 1966, he was elected a full member of the Mexican Academy of Language, and took the 28th chair of that institution on 9 December 1966.

== Publications ==
- El libro de los madrigales, Anthology, 1929.
- Alma campesina, 1930.
- Ella.
- Poemas de amor, 1933.
- No!. poems, 1938.
- Fuerza. poems, 1946.
- Carta Athenagórica de Sor Juana Inés de la Cruz, 1945.
- México en la historia, 1951.
- Cinco sonetos, 1953.
- Rosa de primavera, story, 1955.
- Albas, poems, 1956.
- Homónimos. Algunos sinónimos y antónimos, 1956.
- Cuaderno de homónimos, 1958.
- Canciones, poems, 1959.
- Oaxaca: nombres y signos, 1964.
- Voces en cielo y tierra, 1966
- Nociones de gramática. La composición, 1966.
- Historia y origen del soneto, 1966.

This page is a translation of the Spanish Wikipedia article on Efren Nunez Mata.
