= CEISAL =

Non profit organization

The European Council for Social Research on Latin America (CEISAL, for its Spanish name "Consejo Europeo de Investigaciones Sociales sobre América Latina) is a scientific association that brings together 35 research institutes, university faculties and other organizations in 16 European countries that study Latin American affairs.

== Bodies and meetings ==
The CEISAL is a non-profit scientific association. Its main objectives are the contribution to research work, the production of knowledge through research and the recognition of the work that social science does to better understand the social, political and economic development of the Latin American region. All of the above is possible thanks to the close collaboration among its members, as well as with organizations and institutes in Latin America.

The main bodies of CEISAL are the General Assembly, composed of the member institutes/associations, and the Board of Directors, elected by the General Assembly and composed of a maximum of nine members. Both bodies meet annually, either physically or online. According to the statutes, the Steering Committee elects the Presidency of CEISAL for a period of three years. The current chair is held by Francisco Sánchez of the University of Salamanca in Spain.

Every three years CEISAL organizes an international congress. For more information, see list below.

== Congresses ==
I: Salamanca June 26–28, 1996

II: Halle 4–9 September 1998

III: Amsterdam July 3–6, 2002

IV: Bratislava 4–7 July 2004

V: Brussels 11–14 April 2007

VI: Toulouse 30 June - 3 July 2010

VII: Oporto 12–15 June 2013

VIII: Salamanca June 28 - July 1 2016

IX: Bucharest 29–31 July 2019

X: Helsinki 13–15 July 2022

XI: Paris 2-4 June 2025 - CEISAL 2025

XII: Valencia, 2028

== Institutional History ==
CEISAL was founded in Rheda Castle, Westphalia, on April 16, 1971, as an initiative to build a bridge between Western and Eastern Europe. The intention was to open a space of academic freedom and critical exchange between the two regions in order to contribute to the development of European Latin Americanism. Twenty-four research and teaching institutions from eight Western European countries as well as from Poland and Hungary and Czechoslovakia participated in the founding event. The protagonist of this initiative was Hanns-Albert Steger, sociologist at the University Erlangen-Nürnberg, who chaired CEISAL for 24 years.

The statutes were officially registered by the Austrian state in 1980 and the legal seat is still at the Austrian Institute for Latin America in Vienna. CEISAL was recognized by Unesco in 1984 and in 1997 was granted official status as a non-governmental organization in operational relations with Unesco. The statutes were amended in 1998 and 2002 for greater flexibility, efficiency and transparency of the organization. In 2024 CEISAL has 35 members - institutes and centers specialized in Latin American and Caribbean studies and national associations, representing 16 European countries.

CEISAL collaborates closely with the European Network for Information and Documentation on Latin America (REDIAL).

Together with the Professor Andrzej Dembicz Foundation, CEISAL regularly organizes the Professor Andrzej Dembicz Award for the best doctoral thesis on Latin America and the Caribbean.

List of CEISAL presidents:

1971-1995: Hanns-Albert Steger, University Erlangen-Nürnberg, Germany.

1995-2001: Romain Gaignard, University of Toulouse II - Jean Jaurès, France

2001-2007: Andrzej Dembicz, University of Warsaw, Poland

2007-2010: Klaus Bodemer, Institut für Iberoamerika-Kunde (today: GIGA Institut for Lateinamerican studies), Germany

2010-2013: Miguel Carrera Troyano, University of Salamanca, Spain

2013-2016: Carlos Quenan, Institut des Amériques, France

2016-2019: Jussi Pakkasvirta, University of Helsinki, Finland

2019-2022: Maria Clara Medina, University of Gothenburg, Sweden

2022-2025: Merike Blofield (until 2023) and Bert Hoffmann (2023–2025), German Institute for Global and Area Studies (GIGA)

2025-2028: Francisco Sánchez, Universidad de Salamanca

== Members ==
=== International ===
- Centro de Estudios, Formación e Información de América Latina (CEFIAL)

=== Germany ===
- German Association for Latin American Research (ADLAF)
- Ibero-American Institute of Prussian Cultural Heritage (IAI), Berlín
- Latin American Institute (LAI) of the Freie Universität Berlin
- German Institute for Global and Area Studies (GIGA)
- University of Hamburg

=== Belgium ===
- (IRELAC/ICHEC) - Institut Interdisciplinaire pour les Relations entre l’Union Européenne, l’Amérique Latine, l’Afrique et les Caraïbes

=== Spain ===
- University of Valencia
- Instituto de Iberoamérica y el Mediterráneo, Fundación Laboral de Asistencia y Promoción de Empresas (FLAPE), Valencia
- Instituto de Estudios Latinoamericanos (IELAT), University of Alcalá
- Instituto Interuniversitario de Estudios de Iberoamérica, University of Salamanca
- Instituto Universitario de Estudios sobre América Latina (IEAL), University of Sevilla

=== Finland ===
- Department of World Cultures, University of Helsinki

=== France ===
- Centre de recherche et de documentation de l'Amérique latine (CREDA), Université de la Sorbonne Nouvelle Paris III
- Institut des Hautes Etudes de l‘Amérique Latine (IHEAL), Université de la Sorbonne Nouvelle Paris III
- Institut des Amériques; Centre national de la recherche scientifique. SCTD, GIS IDA, 3486 (C.N.R.S.)
- (IPEAT) Institut Pluridisciplinaire pour les Études sur les Amériques à Toulouse

=== Norway ===
- Norwegian Association of Latin American Studies (NALAS)

=== Hungary ===
- Centro Iberoamericano, University of Pécs
- Departamento de Estudios Hispánicos, Szeged University

=== Netherlands ===
- Centro de Estudios y Documentación Latinoamericana (CEDLA), University of Amsterdam

=== Italy ===
- Associazione di Studi Sociali Latinoamericani (ASSLA)
- Centro Studi Giuridici Latinoamericani (CSGLA), Università degli Studi di Roma 'Tor Vergata'

=== Poland ===
- Institute of Iberian and Ibero-American Studies, University of Warsaw
- American Studies Center of the University of Warsaw

=== Portugal ===
- ISCTE (CEI-IUL) Istituto Universitário de Lisboa

=== United Kingdom ===
- Latin American Centre, University of Oxford

=== Russia (Federation) ===
- Ibero-American World Studies Association (AEMI)
- Institute of Latin America (ILA ACR), Russian Academy of Sciences
- Center for Ibero-American Studies, Saint Petersburg State University
- People's Friendship University of Russia, Moscow

=== Sweden ===
- Nordic Institute of Latin American Studies (NILAS), Stockholm University
- School of Global Studies, University of Gothenburg

=== Serbia ===
- Departamento de Estudios Italianos e Iberoamericanos, Faculty of Philosophy and Letters (CIBAM), University of Novi Sad

=== Invited members ===
- Red Europea de Información y Documentación sobre América Latina (REDIAL)
- Fundación Profesor Andrzej Dembicz (FUNDACJA)
- Latin American Studies Association (LASA)
- University of Miami Institute for Advanced Study of the Americas (UMIA)

== Related Links ==
- CEISAL
