= Joaquín Gori =

Vice President of the New Granada from 1843 to 1847

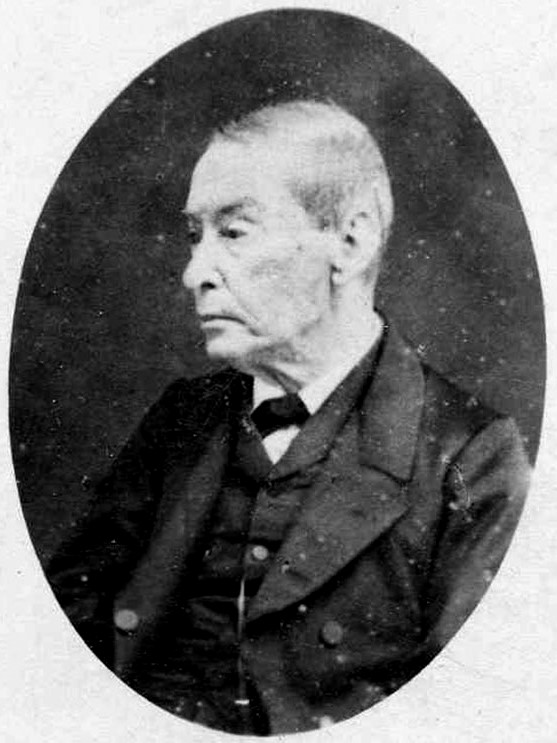
- Portrait c. 1849.

6th Vice President of the New Granada
- In office April 1, 1843 – April 1, 1847
- President: Pedro Alcántara Herrán
- Preceded by: Domingo Caycedo
- Succeeded by: Rufino Cuervo y Barreto

Personal details
- Born: Joaquín José Gori Álvarez de Castro; February 11, 1798 Cartagena, Province of Cartagena, Viceroyalty of New Granada, Spanish Empire
- Died: June 19, 1868 (aged 70) Bogotá, Federal State of Cundinamarca, U.S. of Colombia
- Party: Conservative

Joaquín José Gori Álvarez de Castro (February 11, 1798 — June 19, 1868) was a Colombian politician, lawyer, judge, attorney, and military officer who served as the 6th Vice President of New Granada under President Pedro Alcántara Herrán. A member of the Conservative party, he also served as Senator, President of the Senate of New Granada, and Governor of the Province of Bogotá.
