= Roberto Castillo Udiarte =

Roberto Castillo Udiarte (1951) is a Mexican poet, fiction writer and translator, most notably of Charles Bukowski.

Born in Tecate in 1951, he has spent the last 25 years in Tijuana. His books of poetry include Blues cola de lagarto (1985), Cartografía del alma (1987), Nuestras vidas son otras (1994), La pasión de Angélica según el Johnny Tecate (1996) and Elamoroso Guaguagá (2002). His books of fiction include Pequeño bestiario y otras miniaturas (1982) and Arrimitos o los pequeños mundos en tu piel (1992). Udiarte has also published a fictionalized biography of the boxer, Jorge Maromero Paez, Gancho al Corazon: La saga del Maromero Paez (1997). "My writing is a response to what's happening in Tijuana," he declared. "Sometimes it can be Tijuanarchy." La Prensa San Diego has anointed Udiarte “the Godfather of Tijuana’s counterculture,” not a small claim in a city with such a vibrant and funky subculture. He has appeared in English in Stories from Where We Live—The California Coast (Milkweed Editions 2001), Across the Line/Al Otro Lado: the Poetry of Baja California (Junction Press 2002), Puro Border (Cinco Puntos Press 2003), Jacket 21 and Fascicle 3.
