= Universidad Juárez Autónoma de Tabasco =

PUblic university in n Villahermosa, Tabasco, Mexico

- Former name: Instituto Juárez (1879-1958)
- Motto: Estudio en la duda, acción en la fe
- Motto in English: Study when in doubt, action on faith
- Type: Public university
- Established: 1879 (as Instituto Juárez); November 20, 1958 (as a university)
- Endowment: U.S. $77 million (2023)
- Rector: Guillermo Narváez Osorio
- Faculty: 2,717 (2022-2023)
- Administrative staff: 2,304 (2022-2023)
- Students: 29,367 (2022-2023)
- Undergraduates: 28,051 (2022-2023)
- Postgraduates: 1,256 (2022-2023)
- Other students: 60 (2022-2023)
- Location: Villahermosa, Tabasco, Mexico; 18°00′30″N 92°55′30″W
- Campus: Urban, 1.5 km² (370.7 acres)
- Athletics: Intramural teams
- Colors: Red & Green
- Mascot: Juchimán
- Website: Official

Universidad Juárez Autónoma de Tabasco (Juárez Autonomous University of Tabasco, also known as UJAT) is a public institution of higher learning located in Villahermosa, Tabasco, Mexico. The mission of the university is "to prepare professionals with broad and deep expertise in their area of study to fill the needs of Tabasco and the country at large." UJAT is the largest and most prominent university in the state of Tabasco. During the 2007-2008 academic year the university enrolled 35,271 students and had a teaching staff of over 2,000. For the same school year the university offered bachelor's degrees in 36 disciplines, master's degrees in 26 areas, three doctoral degrees, and post-graduate Certificates (Especialidades) in 17 graduate areas of specialization (mostly in the medical field). The university grants law, education, management, engineering, medicine, architecture, nursing, and dentistry degrees, plus some 30 additional degrees in other fields of study.

== History ==
=== Juarez Institute ===
The origin of the university dates back to 1860, when the governor of Tabasco, Víctor Dueñas, asked President Benito Juárez for funds to establish a secondary, preparatory, and college-level educational institution to serve the community of Tabasco; such funds were granted a year later. However, it was not until January 1, 1879, that new institution opened its doors to the public as the Instituto Juárez (Juárez Institute). This took place with the support of governor Simón Sarlat Nova and the liberal politician and writer Manuel Sánchez Mármol, who became the first director of the institution. The first enrollment consisted of less than 100 students in nine academic disciplines: agriculture, veterinary medicine, land surveying, public notary, law, management, education, jurisprudence, and pharmacy. On August 1, 1947, the institute was admitted into the National Association of Universities and Institutions of Higher Education (ANUIES) in Mexico.

=== Transformation into a University ===
The 1950s saw an interest in changing the name of the school to better reflect its focus on higher learning. "In 1958, Lic. Antonio Ocampo Ramírez, Director of the Juárez Institute, put together a bill to transform the Institute into a University. On November 20, 1958, the Juárez Institute was renamed to Universidad Juárez Autónoma de Tabasco by a Tabasco state legislature decree Antonio Ocampo Ramírez was the last director of the Institute and the first rector of the new institution."

In 1958, while General Miguel Orrico de los Llanos was the governor of Tabasco, the Juárez Institute became the Juarez University of Tabasco." In February 1964, Lic. Adolfo López Mateos, President of Mexico, inaugurated the Zona de la Cultura, or Cultural Zone, at the site where the University currently has its main campus on Avenida Universidad. "As a result, a significant number of the degree programs offered at the old Institute's location were moved to their new quarters."

=== Autonomous University ===
In December 1966, while Manuel R. Mora Martínez was the governor of the State, and Dr. Miguel A. Gómez Ventura was the rector of the school, the university became an autonomous entity, "becoming then the Juárez Autonomous University of Tabasco." "December 1966, is a memorable date, as it was then that the university was granted its autonomy, becoming from that point forward, the Juárez Autonomous University of Tabasco."

=== Decentralization ===
In July 1966, the university started the process of decentralization with the separation of its Preparatory School, and the construction and inauguration of the College of Veterinary Medicine on the Villahermosa-Teapa Road. Decentralization continued in 1978 with the inauguration of facilities for the College of Law in Colonia Reforma, Villahermosa, and in 1982, with the establishment in Cunduacán of the College of Engineering and Architecture. In 2008, the university consisted of 10 divisions on 7 campuses spread over three municipalities of the State of Tabasco. There are campuses in four colonies in the Municipality of Centro in Villahermosa.

=== Accelerated Growth ===
On December 11, 1987, in light of "technological changes," the State of Tabasco passed the Organic Law of the Juarez Autonomous University of Tabasco, intended to establish a modern organizational structure at the university that could serve as the basis for dealing with the "accelerated growth" in student registration and stimulating the university to transform itself into "a center of academic excellence".

As a result, the last 20 years have seen a significant amount of growth at the university. For example, in 1997, the university started the Extension Program at facilities in the town of Tenosique. This Extension Program includes a distance learning program amongst its various other academic offerings. In 2007, the Extension Program became the College of Multidisciplinary Studies at Los Ríos.

The 2010s also saw the UJAT make a major push into broadcasting. In 2011, XHUJAT-FM 107.3 "Radio UJAT" took to the air, and in November 2016, it was joined by a television station, XHUJAT-TDT 35.

== Location ==
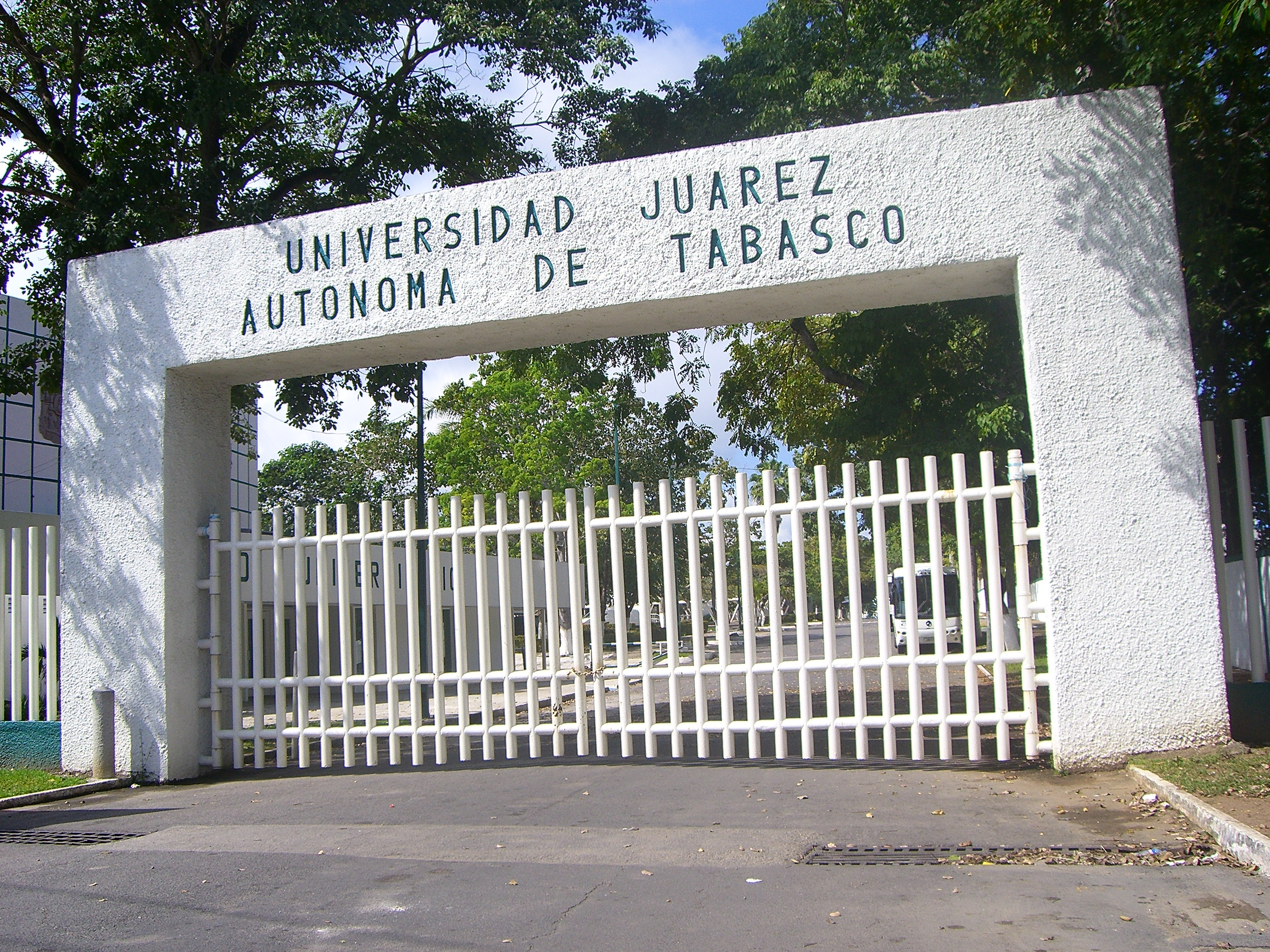
Main Entrance at its Central Campus on University Avenue, Villahermosa

The university facilities are located in mostly urban areas and follow primarily a decentralized model. The facilities are distributed over nine campuses – six in the capital city of Villahermosa and three in the municipality of Cunduacán. There is also an extension program (formally, the Multidisciplinary College of los Ríos) that operates from the town of Tenosique. The central offices of the university, as well as its main campus, are located on Avenida Universidad, Villahermosa, and it hosts the College of Education and Arts, and the College of Economics and Management. The Colleges of Health Sciences, Life Sciences, Social Sciences and Humanities, and Agricultural and Fish Sciences are located at various other campuses in the city of Villahermosa. The College of Systems and Informatics, the College of Basic Sciences, and the College of Engineering and Architecture are located in Cunduacán.

In January 2009, the university began construction of its tenth Academic Division in the town of Comalcalco. With an initial budget of 38 million Mexican pesos, this new location will be called the Multidisciplinary Division of Comalcalco. The municipality of Comalcalco is located about 45 miles from the city of Villahermosa, and the university expects the new location to benefit some 865 students from the Chontalpa region currently enrolled at the university's other locations. Construction is expected to be completed by mid-2009 and the new facilities will consist mostly of classrooms, laboratories, and a library. Instruction will be primarily in the health sciences.

== Accreditation ==
The university has been accredited at the national level by the Asociación Nacional de Universidades e Instituciones de Educación Superior (National Association of universities and Institutions of Higher Learning) since August 1, 1947. The nursing, psychology, economics, management, public accounting, and labor relations programs are accredited at the national level by the Consejo para la Acreditación de la Educación Superior (COPAES). The program on dental surgery is accredited nationally by the Comité de Acreditación del Consejo Nacional de Educación Odontológica (CONAEDO). The medical surgeon program is accredited at the national level by the Consejo Mexicano para la Acreditación de la Educación Médica (COMAEM). The biology and ecology programs are accredited by the Comité para la Acreditacion de la Licenciatura en Biologia (CACEB).

September 11, 2008, saw the accreditation of two more academic programs in the College of Agricultural and Fish Sciences: agronomy and food engineering. These two programs received nationwide accreditation by the Comité Mexicano de Acreditacion de la Educacion Agronomica (COMEAA). The Communications program was accredited on September 30, 2008, by the Consejo para la Acreditación de la Comunicación (CONAC). The Education program was accredited on December 11, 2009, by the Comité para la Evaluación de Programas de Pedagogía y Educación A.C. (CEPPE). The program on Architecture is also accredited, according to a November 3, 2009, report in the school's Juchiman periodical.

While the university as a whole is accredited by ANUIES, program-specific accreditation, when available, is sought by its colleges. An example is the College of Basic Sciences which is currently (2008) seeking accreditation for each one of its program offerings. The university has also created an internal commission for the self-evaluation of its post graduate programs. On January 22, 2008, the Rectory pledged to obtain accreditation for each and all of the remaining academic offerings at the university.

== Institutional quality ==
On August 28, 2007, the university was recognized as one of the 13 best in Mexico by the Mexican Secretary of Public Education (SEP). Just a year earlier, during the 2006–2007 academic year, the university had been recognized as one of the 16 best by the same entity. In an ATEI Informa newsbrief dated October 12, 2006, the Asociación de Televisión Educativa Iberoamericana (Association of Ibero-American Educational Television) reported that "UJAT was among the 16 best universities in the country when it received an acknowledgement to that effect granted by the Secretary for Public Education." This recognition was made "for offering 22 educational programs to 79 percent of its student body that ranked at Level 1 of the Comités Interinstitucionales para la Evaluación de la Educación Superior (CIEES), plus two other granted by national-level accrediting entities."

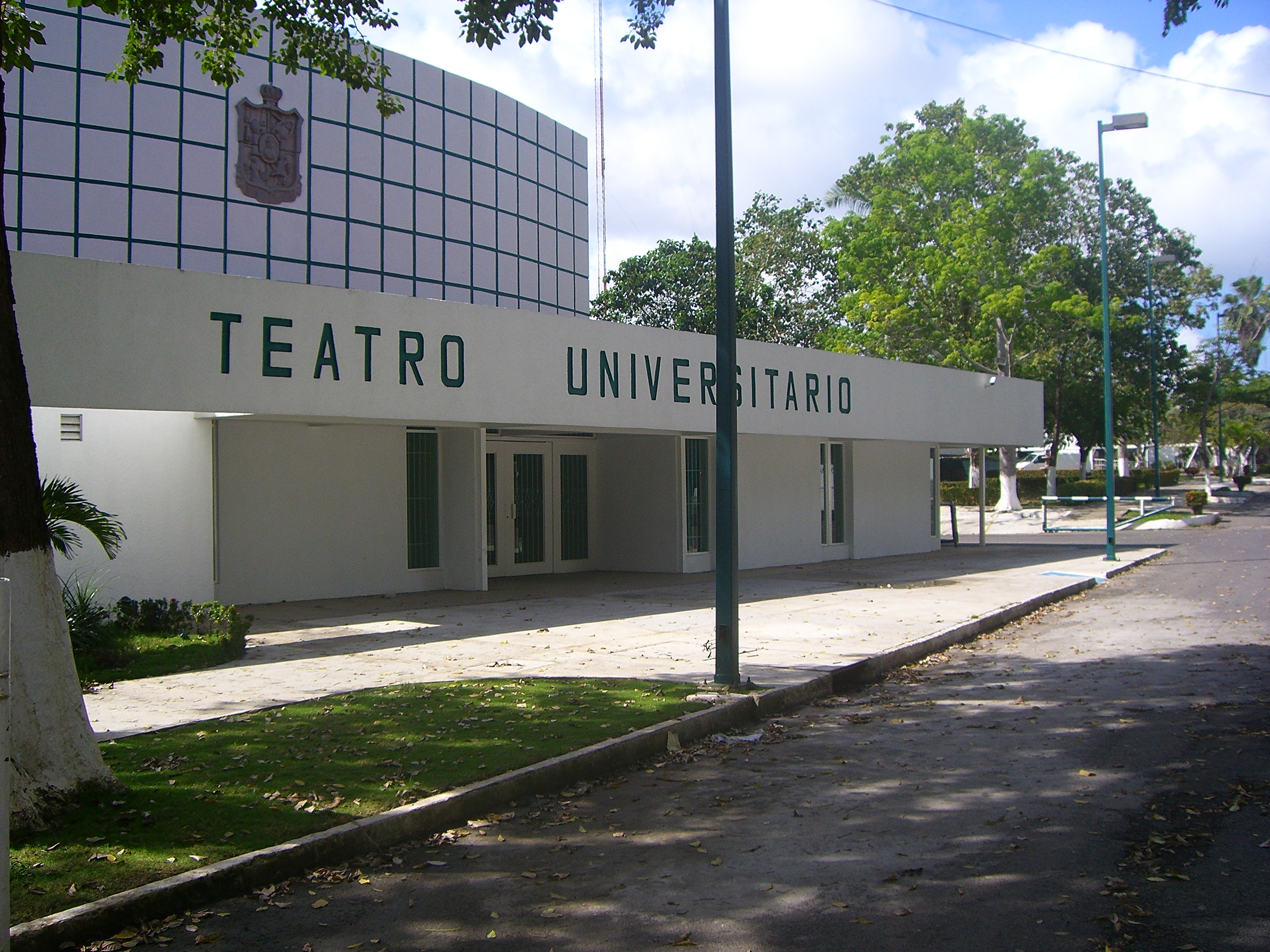
University Theater where conventions and other assemblies take place

The 2007 recognition, like the one on the previous year, was made to recognize the university's launching of a study on strategic planning which led the institution to achieve the standards required of an institution of higher learning increasingly competitive at national and international levels.

As of October 12, 2006, the following nine parameters were considered in bestowing the Academic Institutional Quality honor unto the university:

- All of its thirty-three (33) bachelor's degrees have been evaluated by the Comités Interinstitucionales para la Evaluación de la Educación Superior (CIEES).
- Twenty-two (22) of its academic programs ranked at the CIEES Level I; two other programs are accredited by the Consejo para la Acreditación de la Educación Superior (COPAES).
- Seventy-nine (79) percent of its students are enrolled in one of its 24 bachelor's programs recognized for their academic quality.
- Forty-eight (48) of its faculty is part of the National Researchers Association and 144 more are part of the State of Tabasco Researchers Association.
- Fifty-five (55) of its students are enrolled in the Movilidad Estudiantil student exchange program.
- Nine-four (94) students are engaged in national research internship programs with other Mexican educational institutions, making UJAT the second largest participant in such Programa del Verano Científico.
- Sixty (60) percent of its full-time faculty has a graduate degree in their discipline: 346 have the master's degree while 103 have a doctoral degree.
- The university runs 327 research projects—128 of them externally financed and 199 running on institutionally-based financing.
- The school's student services and the library system are certified by the ISO 9001:2000 norm standard.

As of August 1, 1947, the university library consisted of 249,100 volumes. Today the university library system serves all campuses out of nine library locations as follows:

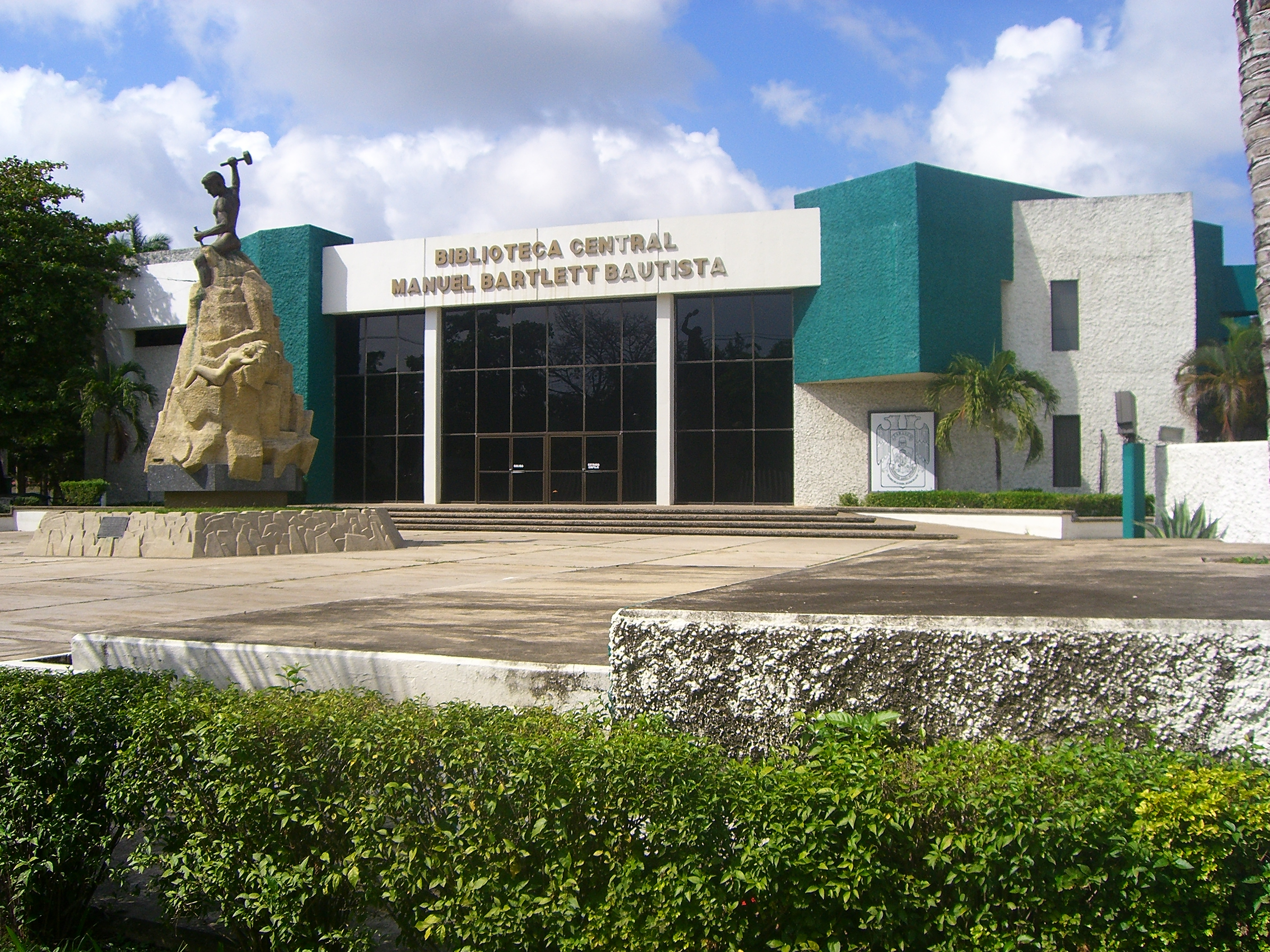
UJAT's Main Library. It is one of nine libraries spread throughout the university

- The Lic. Manuel Barlett Bautista Library, located on University Avenue, Villahermosa, is the largest facility of the university's library system. It is also known as the Central Library.
- The Ing. Cesar O. Palacio Tapia Library, also known as the Library of the Chontalpa, servers the Colleges of Basic Sciences, Information Sciences and Systems, and Engineering and Architecture, all located in Cunduacan, Tabasco. It is the second largest library in the UJAT library system.
- The M.V.Z. Faustino Torres Castro Library is located in Villahermosa at the College of Fish and Agricultural Sciences. It is also known as the DACA Library from that College's acronym in Spanish.
- The Lic. Jose Ma. Gurria Urgell Library is located in Villahermosa at the College of Social Sciences and Humanities, and its book and magazine collection reflects that College's interests. It is also called the Library of the College of Social Sciences and Humanities.
- The Health Sciences Library is located at the Health Sciences campus in Colonia Tamulte, Villahermosa, and serves the needs of that academic community.
- The Jose Marti Library. Established in 1944, it is the oldest library in the UJAT Library system.
- The Lic. Belisario Colorado Jr. Library, is the library of the College of Education and Arts. It is located within the facilities of that College at Zona de la Cultura, University City, University Avenue, Villahermosa.
- The Dr. Juan Jose Beauregard Cruz Library is the library of the College of Life Sciences.
- The Los Rios Library, located at the College of Los Rios in Tenosique, Tabasco.

== Academics ==
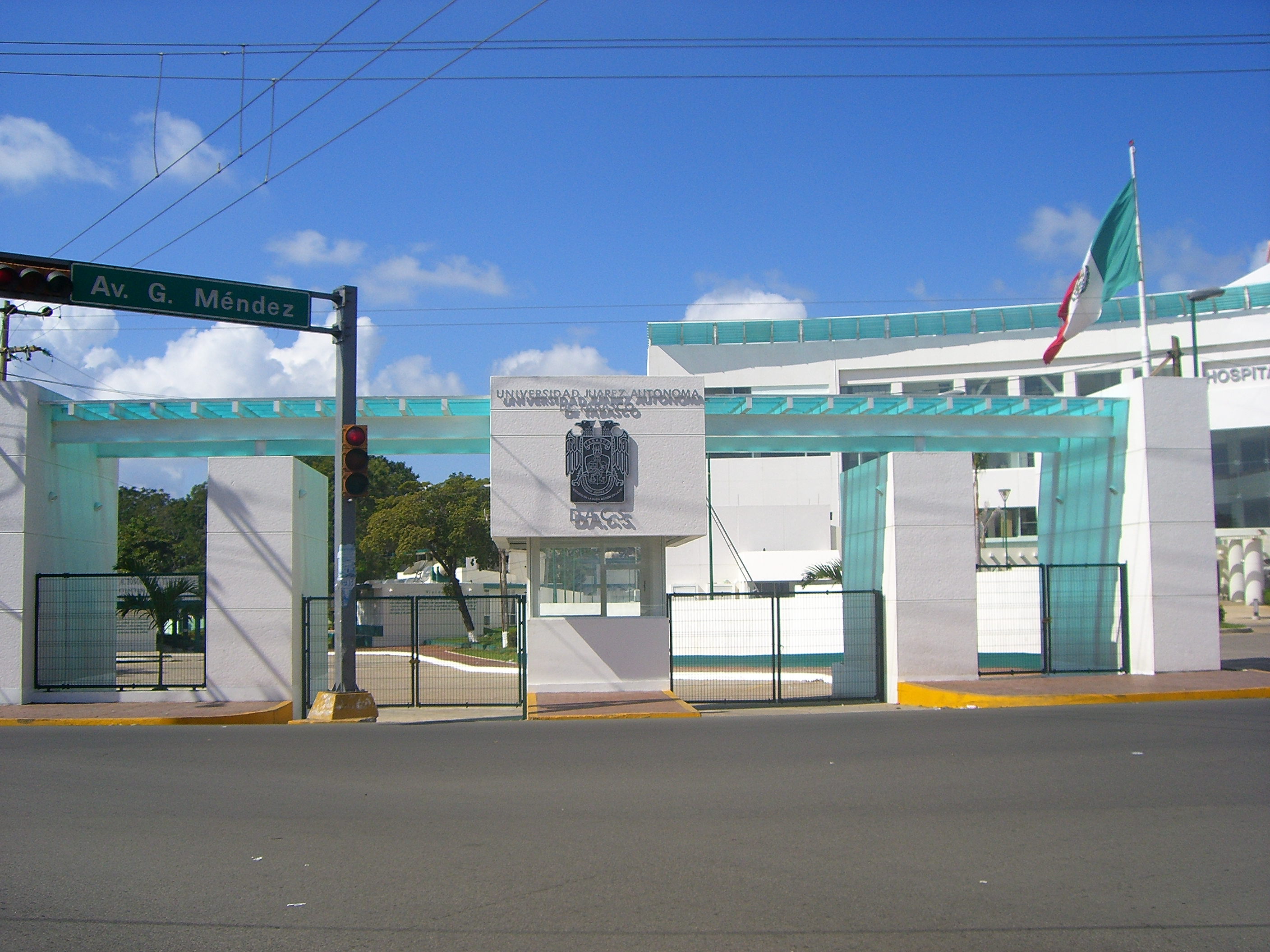
The College of Health Sciences on Mendez Ave. houses the departments of Nursing, Dentistry, Medicine, and Allied Health Sciences

The university is divided into nine separate academic divisions, roughly equivalent to the college or school subdivisions of other major universities and which denotes the granting of a certain level of autonomy to the internal affairs of the academic subdivision in question. Students choose entry into one of these nine academic divisions, though degrees are granted and titled by the university. Prospective students must possess a high school diploma, preferably from a college preparatory high school, and pass a university entrance exam to be admitted into the academic division of their choice. Moving from one academic division to another within the university is generally not possible without significant loss of earned academic credits. The university integrates intramural sports, physico-culture, fitness, band, and ballet teams amongst its extracurricular offerings.

The university has collective agreements with various other institutions and organizations. One such agreement is with the Texas A&M University "intended to create an environment conductive to the broadening and strengthening of its programs". The College of Basic Sciences has collective agreements with the Universidad Nacional Autónoma de México (UNAM), Colegio de Bachilleres de Tabasco (CBT), Dirección General de Educación Tecnológica e Industrial (DGETI), Instituto Mexicano del Petróleo (IMP), Universidad Autónoma del Estado de México (UAEM), Instituto Nacional de Astrofísica Óptica y Electrónica (INAOE), Secretaría de Salud del Edo. de Tabasco, and Petróleos Mexicanos (PEMEX). The College of Life Sciences has a collective agreement with Oregon State University in Corvallis, Oregon, US, for the evaluation, provisioning, and breeding of telapia fish.

== Programs of Study ==
=== Summary of Degrees Offered by Each College ===
College	Bachelor's	Masters	Doctorate	Specialist
Life Sciences	3	2	1	0
Education and Arts	4	4	0	0
Engineering and Architecture	5	1	0	1
Health Sciences	5	5	0	15
Social Sciences and Humanities	3	6	1	0
Informatics and Systems	4	2	0	0
Economics and Administration	4	3	1	1
Basic Sciences	4	1	0	0
Agricultural and Fish Sciences	4	2	0	0
T O T A L S	36	26	3	17

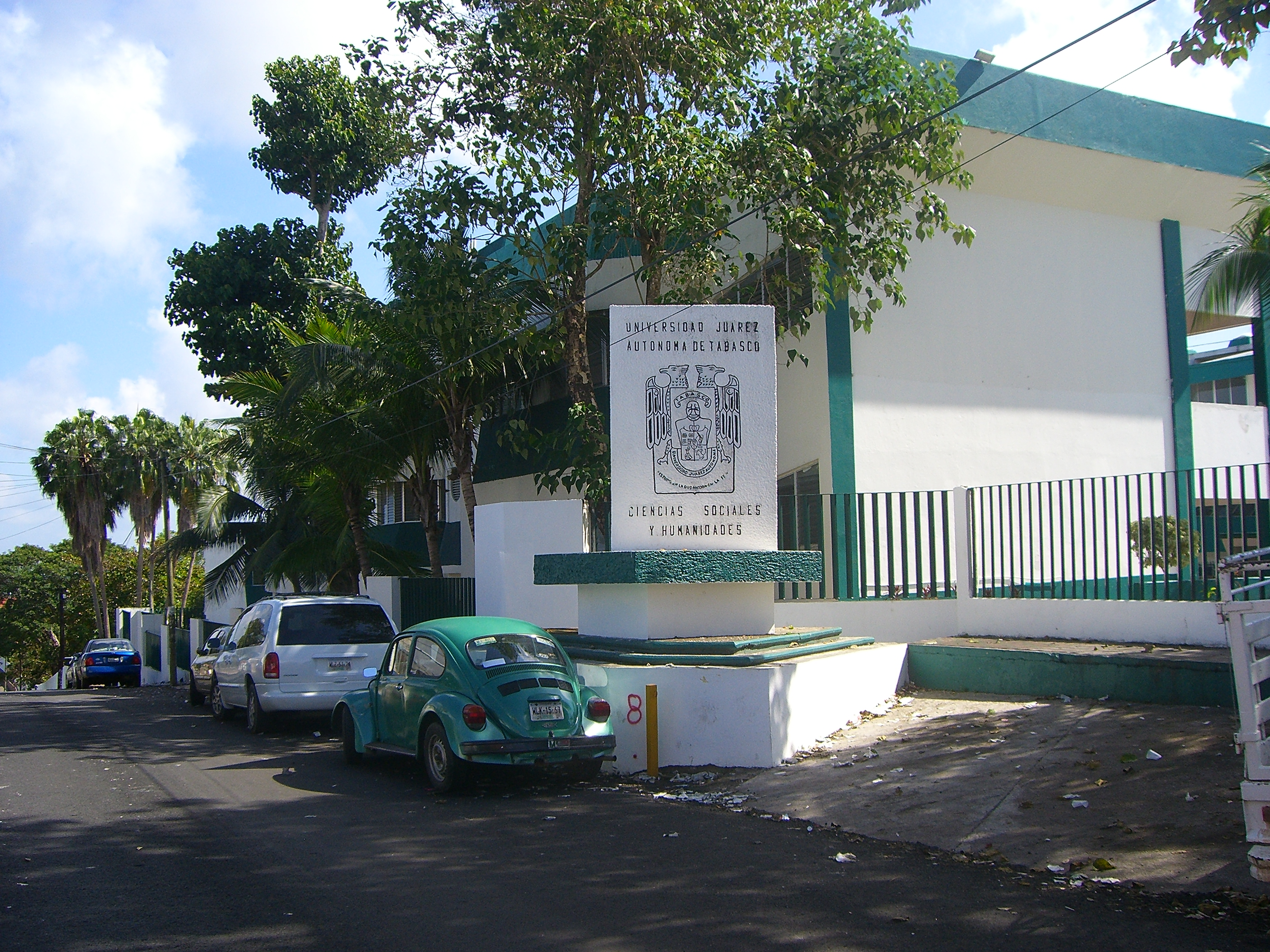
Faculty Office Building at the College of Social Sciences and Humanities which comprises the departments of History, Sociology, and Law

=== Licenciaturas ===
The university grants the degree of Licenciatura in the following 36 areas:

==== College of Life Sciences ====
• Biology (Accredited) • Ecology (Accredited) • Environmental Engineering (Accredited)

==== College of Education and Arts ====
• Education (Accredited) • Communications (Accredited) • Languages • Cultural Studies

==== College of Engineering and Architecture ====
• Civil Engineering • Electrical and Electronics Engineering • Mechanical Engineering • Chemical Engineering • Architecture (Accredited)

==== College of Health Sciences ====
• Medicine (Accredited) • Dental Surgery (Accredited) • Psychology (Accredited) • Nutrition • Nursing (Accredited)

==== College of Social Sciences and Humanities ====
• Law • History • Sociology

==== College of Informatics and Systems ====
• Management Information Systems (Accredited) • Computer Systems (Accredited) • Telematics • Information Technology

==== College of Economics and Administration ====
• Management (Accredited) • Public Accounting (Accredited) • Economics (Accredited) • Labor Relations (Accredited)

==== College of Basic Sciences ====
• Computer Science • Mathematics • Physics • Chemistry

==== College of Agricultural and Fish Sciences ====
• Agronomy (Accredited) • Aquaculture Engineering • Food Engineering (Accredited) • Veterinary Medicine and Zoology

==== College of Multidisciplinary Studies ====
• Aquaculture Engineering • Management • Food Engineering (Accredited) • Management Information Systems • Law

=== Master's degrees ===
The university grants the master's degree in the following 26 fields:

==== College of Life Sciences ====
• Environmental Sciences • Engineering and Environmental Protection

==== College of Education and Arts ====
• Teaching • Education • Communications • Educational Sexology

==== College of Engineering and Architecture ====
• Hydraulic Engineering

==== College of Health Sciences ====
• Medical Sciences • Social Gerontology • Primary Health Care • Basic Biomedical Sciences • Public Health Sciences

==== College of Social Sciences and Humanities ====
• Judiciary Management • Social Sciences • Civil Law • Criminal Law • Constitutional Human Rights Law • Law

==== College of Informatics and Systems ====
• Computer Systems • Information Technology Management

==== College of Economics and Administration ====
• Management • Public Accounting • Marketing • Economics

==== College of Basic Sciences ====
• Applied Mathematics

==== College of Agricultural and Fish Sciences ====
• Food Science • Animal Health Sciences

=== Doctorate degrees ===
The university grants doctoral degrees in the following three areas:

==== College of Life Sciences ====
• Ecology and Tropical Systems Management

==== College of Social Sciences and Humanities ====
• Law

==== College of Economics and Administration ====
• Organizational Studies

=== Postgraduate diplomas ===
The university grants postgraduate diplomas in the following 17 areas:

==== College of Economics and Administration ====
• Tax accounting

==== College of Engineering and Architecture ====
• Real Estate Assessment

==== College of Health Sciences ====
• Anesthesiology • General Surgery • Pediatric nursing • Surgical Nursing • Critical care nursing • Obstetrics and gynaecology • Public Health • Internal Medicine • Pediatric Odontology • Pediatrics • Psychiatry • Family Medicine • Neonatology • Radiology and Imaging • Orthopedics and Intensive Care

== Research ==
As of October 2006, the university operated under the following four research parameters:

- Forty-eight (48) of its faculty were part of the Mexico's National Researchers Association.
- One hundred forty-four (144) faculty members were part of the State of Tabasco Researchers Association.
- Nine-four (94) students were engaged in national research internship programs with other Mexican educational institutions. This made UJAT the second largest participant in the Programa del Verano Científico (Summer Science Program).
- The university ran 327 research projects—128 of them externally financed and 199 operating on institutionally-based financing.

The university houses an Institute of Aquaculture, and basic research is performed at this facility. Research scientists from other academic institutions worldwide have participated in research endeavors here.

The university also houses, via the College of Life Sciences, the Centro de Transferencia Tecnológica Para La Acuacultura (CETRA). "The Center includes a consortium of Mexican universities and public/private foundations that have an associated interest in aquaculture. Its goal is to support and guide aquaculture to be sustainable and commercially viable. CETRA has established the initial network of academic and economic resources in Mexico and the United States that provide extension services for meeting Mexico’s sustainable aquaculture development goals." The center's website is at CETRA.

As of February 2009, the university had approved the opening of a Centro de Investigaciones sobre Energia, Agua, y Cambio Climatico, or Research Center for Energy, Water, and Climatic Change. This is a partnership between the UNAM, the Mexican Academy of Sciences, and the university.

In April 2009, the university opened the Centro de Integración Ovina del Sureste (CIOS), or The Southeastern Center for Ovine Integration, in the College of Fish and Agricultural Sciences.

Since 1986, the university has moved along in a meaningful manner towards consolidating its areas of research, not only by diversifying its centers, projects, and research programs based on their respective fields of study, but also by striking collective agreements and inter-institutional relations with both academic and non-academic institutions with the purpose of increasing participation and financing.

Other centers of investigation at the university include:

- The Center for Research on the Olmeca and Maya Cultures
- Center for Study and Research of the Fine Arts
- General Bureau for Fish Life
- Bureau for Development
- Bureau for Higher Education and Scientific Investigation
- Regional Museum of Anthropology

== Notable alumni ==
- José Narciso Rovirosa, prominent biologist who categorized over a thousand species of flora in southern Mexico.
- Eduardo Alday Hernández, prominent lawyer and president of the Supreme Court of the state of Tabasco.
- Manuel Andrade Díaz, governor of Tabasco.
- Francisco J. Santamaría, famed lexicographer of Spanish as spoken in Latin America and Mexico. His two great works are the Diccionario general de americanismos (1942) and the Diccionario de mejicanismos (1959), both of which remain in print as fundamental reference works in their fields. He was also governor of Tabasco.
