= Manuel Sánchez Mármol =

Mexican writer and journalist (1839–1912)

President of the Chamber of Deputies
- In office 1 May 1902 – 31 May 1902
- Preceded by: Manuel Flores

Deputy of the Congress of the Union for the 12th district of the State of Mexico
- In office 16 September 1894 – 31 May 1902
- Preceded by: Pedro Miranda
- Succeeded by: Enrique Landa

Deputy of the Congress of Tabasco
- In office 1883–1885

Personal details
- Born: 25 May 1839 Cunduacán, Mexico
- Died: 6 March 1912 (aged 72) Villahermosa, Mexico
- Parent(s): Ceferino Sánchez (Father); Josefa Mármol (Mother)
- Occupation: Writer, journalist, lawyer, politician

Manuel Sánchez Mármol (May 25, 1839 – March 6, 1912) was a Mexican writer, journalist, lawyer, politician, and a member of the Mexican Academy of Language.

== Life and career ==
Manuel Sánchez Mármol was born to Ceferino Sánchez and Josefa Mármol on May 25, 1839, in Cunduacán, Tabasco, Mexico. His primary studies were carried out at a private school in his home town and, thanks to a scholarship, he went to study at the Conciliar Seminar of San Ildefonso in Mérida, Yucatán, when he was 14 years old. Still being young, around 1854, he got interested in journalism, and along with a classmate, he published two manuscript newspapers: El Rayo (The Lightning) and El Investigador (The Investigator). He later collaborated with El Album Yucateco (The Yucatecan Album) and with El Repertorio Pintoresco (The Colorful Repertory). He organized a literary society named "La Concordia" that edited a journal named La Guirnalda (The Garland). In El Clamor Público (The Public Outcry), a newspaper he founded with Pedro de Regil, Eligio Ancona and Ramón Aldana, Sánchez Mármol published his first political writings, for which he was later appointed as a councilman to the Mérida City Council. Along with Alonso de Regil and José Peón y Contreras, he published a book entitled Poetas yucatecos y tabasqueños (Yucatecan and Tabascan Poets) in 1961. With José Peón y Contreras and Manuel Roque Castellanos, he founded the satirical journal La Burla (The Mockery), which was suppressed by the state government of Yucatán.

During the years of the French intervention in Mexico, Sánchez Mármol stood up for the Liberalism cause by means of his commentaries in the political weekly magazines El Disidente (The Dissident) and El Águila Azteca (The Aztec Eagle), the latter being created by himself. He also collaborated in El Repertorio Pintoresco of Crescencio Carrillo y Ancona and in El Federalista (The Federalist) and El Siglo XIX (The 19th Century) in Mexico City. He occupied diverse public positions, among the ones that stand out are as General Secretary of the State Government and Magistrate of the Supreme Court in the state of Tabasco during the government of Colonel Gregorio Méndez Magaña. He got elected deputy in 1868; however, he did not take office until 1871, and was reelected several times for the state of Tabasco, being a member of the VI, VII and VII Legislature of the Congress of Mexico, and member of the XI Legislature of the State Congress of Tabasco (1883–1884). He was also a representative for the states of Veracruz and Mexico.

He was appointed Secretary of Justice to President José María Iglesias. After the triumph of the Revolution of Tuxtepec, Sánchez Mármol retired to Tabasco, where Governor Simón Sarlat Nova appointed him Director of the Juárez Institute, nowadays Juárez Autonomous University of Tabasco, of which he became the first director since the opening of the institute on January 1, 1879, until the year of 1888.

In 1892, Sánchez Marmol moved to Mexico City where he opened his law firm. He worked at the National Preparatory School where he taught History of Mexico and Literature. He died on March 6, 1912, in Villahermosa, Tabasco.

== Work ==
Manuel Sánchez Mármol is considered an elegant castizo writer, belonging to the group of great Mexican novelists of the latter years of the 19th century and the beginnings of the 20th century, standing among other writers such as Rafael Delgado, Emilio Rabasa, José López Portillo y Rojas, Porfirio Parra, Victoriano Salado Álvarez and Federico Gamboa, figures of the Mexican literary realism. It is possible to see the influence of Juan Valera throughout his fiction writings. His first novel, El misionero de la cruz (The Missionary of the Cross), written in 1860, opened the road to the novel of the natives of Tabasco, even though the novel has Yucatán as a setting, state to which the destiny of Tabasco has been historically associated to. In 1871, Sánchez Mármol wrote Brindis de Navidad (Christmas Toast), a brief story published in Álbum de Navidad (Christmas Album). In 1882, he wrote the political satire Pocahontas, a novel that was lost given that there was only an original edition made on that year as indicated by the Tipográfica Juventud Tabasqueña press which in 2004 was printed again by the state government of Tabasco based on a copy available in the National Library of Mexico that was given to Guillermo Prieto by the author.

== Works ==
- Novels
  - El misionero de la cruz (1860)
  - Pocahontas (1882)
  - La pálida (1892)
  - Juanita Sousa (1901)
  - Antón Pérez (1903)
  - Previvida (1906)
- Essay
  - Las letras patrias (1902)
  - México, su evolución social (1902)
