= Rufino José Cuervo =

Colombian writer, linguist, and philologist

Rufino Jose Cuervo
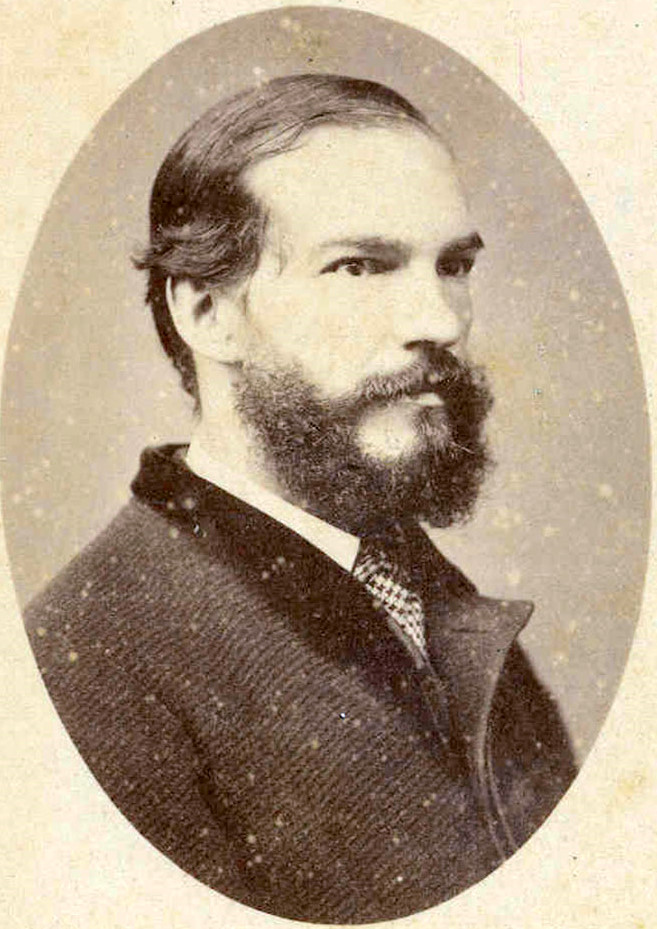
- Born: Rufino José Cuervo Urisarri; September 19, 1844; Bogotá, Colombia
- Died: July 17, 1911 (aged 66); París, France
- Occupations: philologist, writer, linguist
- Father: Rufino Cuervo y Barreto

Rufino José Cuervo Urisarri (Bogotá, Colombia) was a Colombian writer, linguist, and philologist.

== Biography ==
Cuervo was the youngest son of María Francisca Urisarri Tordecillas and Dr. Rufino Cuervo y Barreto, a politician, lawyer, journalist and Vice President of the Republic of New Granada (the precursor to modern Colombia) between 1845 and 1851.

A classicist, he had a rigorous formation in Latin and Greek, but dedicated the majority of his scholarly work to studying dialectal variations of Colombian Spanish. On this topic, he wrote the book Apuntaciones críticas sobre lenguaje bogotano (Critical Notes About Bogotan Language, 1867), which is still an important linguistic reference for Latin American Spanish.

His most important work was Diccionario de construcción y régimen de la lengua castellana (Dictionary of Castilian language construction and rection). This work is updated on a regular basis by the Caro y Cuervo Institute. Cuervo also revised and republished the Spanish American grammar of Andrés Bello, Castilian Grammar for Americans.

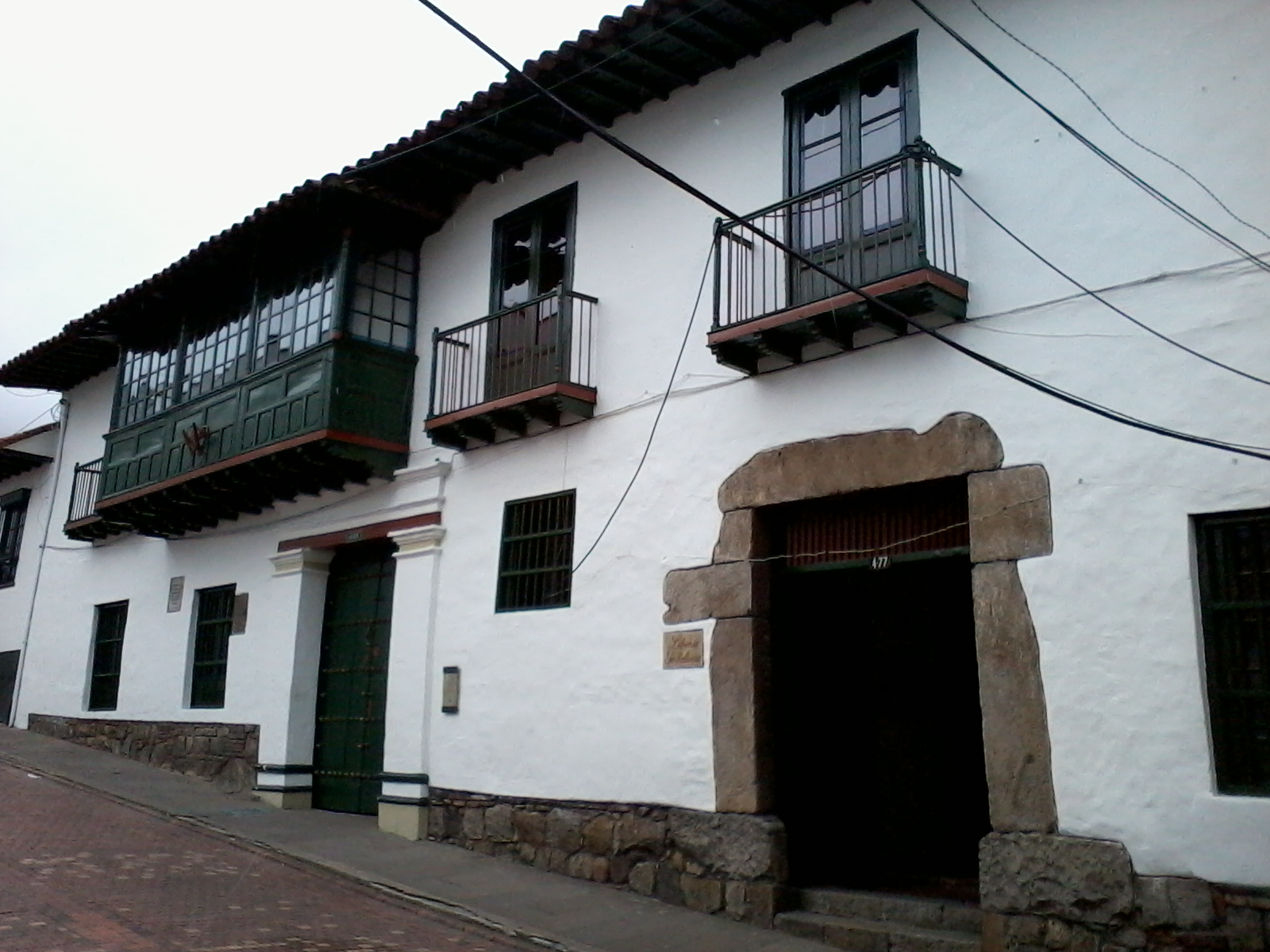
The Caro and Cuervo Institute in the birthplace of Rufino José Cuervo, in Bogotá's historic old town.

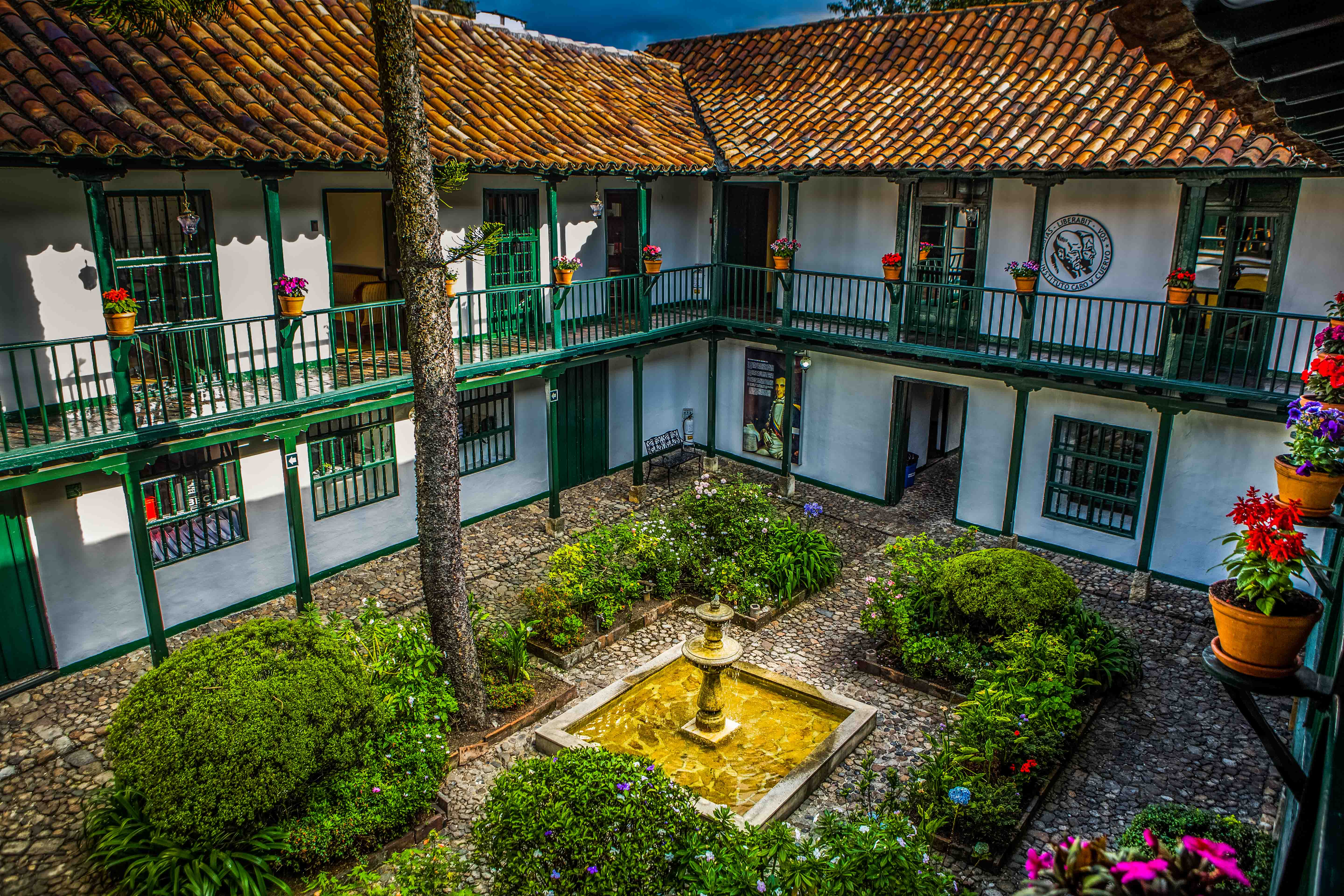
The interior of the Caro and Cuervo Institute in 2017.

Cuervo was one of the first linguists to promote the unification of Spanish in its different variants. Preoccupied with a trend toward linguistic segregation among Spanish American countries, he viewed this phenomenon through the historical lens of the fall of the Roman Empire, after which Latin gradually began splitting into several independent Romance languages, such as Spanish, Portuguese and Italian. For Cuervo and other philologists of the era, the standardization of Latin American Spanish was an effort to prevent such fragmentation in Spanish America.

In 1878 he was admitted as the Colombian representative to the Real Academia Española. In 1882 he moved to Paris, where he lived until his death in 1911.

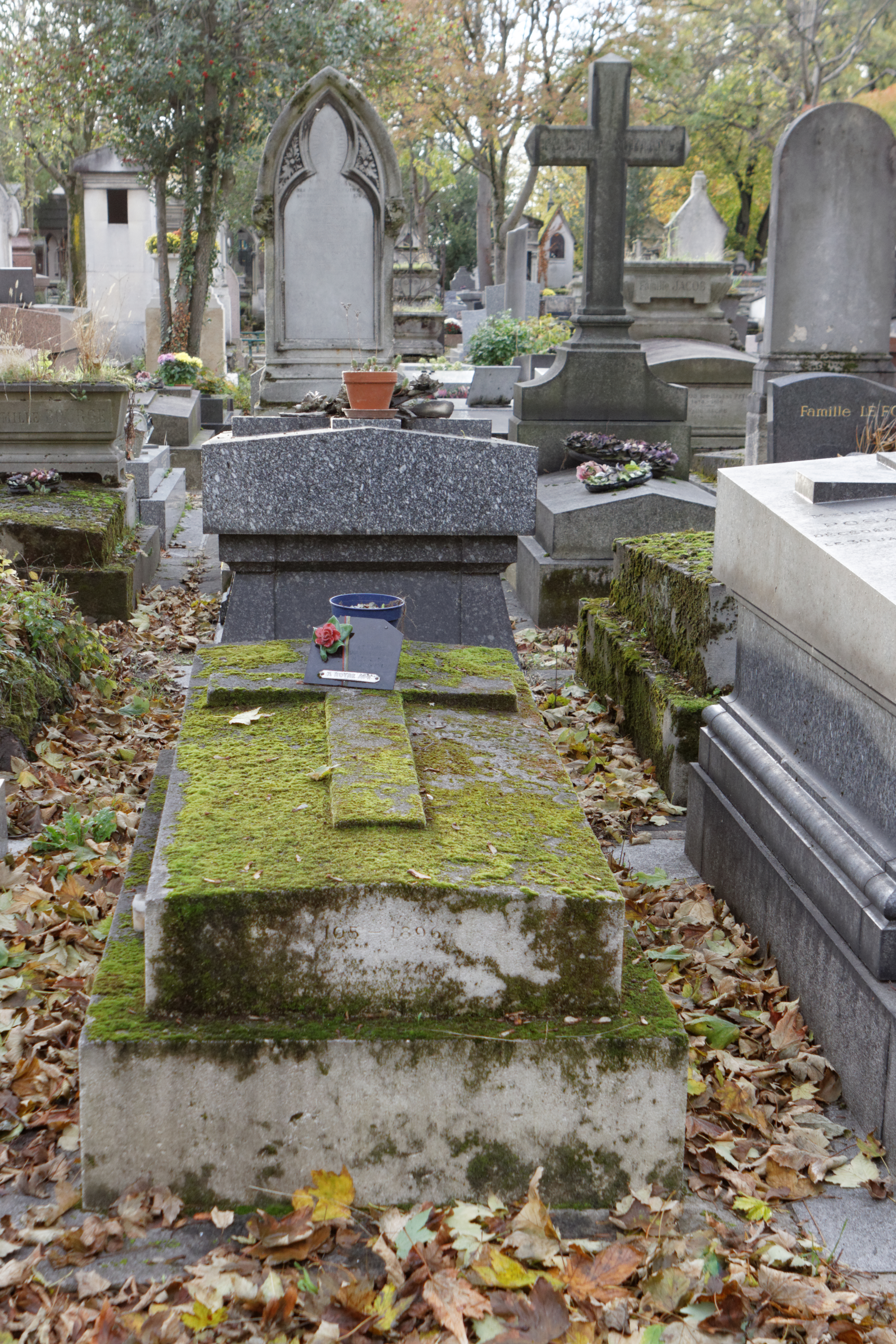
Cuervo's tomb at the famous Père Lachaise Cemetery in Paris

== Bibliography ==
- Rufino José Cuervo – MSN Encarta
