= REDIAL =

REDIAL (Red Europea de Información y Documentación sobre América Latina), the European Network of Information and Documentation on Latin America, is an association formed by libraries and documentation centres in 12 European countries: France, Germany, Netherlands, Russia, United Kingdom, Spain, and Sweden. REDIAL is a meeting platform aiming at contributing to the development of communication and support between institutions, and the exchange of information between researchers, librarians and archivists working in the areas of Latin American humanities and social sciences in Europe. REDIAL is a non-profit European association, regulated by the Spanish legislation. Its organizational structure is formed by an Executive Committee of national coordinators who are elected by the member institution of each European country and a Members General Assembly.

== Publications ==
- Blog: REDIAL & CEISAL Portal Americanista Europeo. Updated information on Latin American research institutions activities and publications in Europe.
- Academic Journal: Anuario Americanista Europeo, published 2003–2014(in collaboration with CEISAL). Information on research and projects of Latin Americanists in Europe.

== History ==
In 1988, invited by the CNRS (Centre Nationale de la Recherche Scientifique) in France, researchers and other European centres for information and research on Latin America organized the symposium "Information Systems in Europe for Latin American Social Sciences and Humanities: balance for a European cooperation" as part of the 46th International Congress of Americanists in Amsterdam. During the symposium, participants agreed to create a European network which would share a collective instrument of work and documentation for the interchange of information about Latin America produced in Europe.

The "European Meeting" which took place in Madrid on 6 and 7 March 1989 took a step further in the formalization of the suggestions and ideas discussed in the Amsterdam symposium. The 35 European institutions that participated in the event put forward a plan of action to be implemented by an international association. This association would be responsible for the continuity of the work and development of the objectives initiated in these two previous meetings. A provisory Executive coordinator was appointed on the occasion who became responsible for writing a draft version of the organization's statute.

The constituent assembly of REDIAL took place in France on 30 November 1 and 2 December 1989 having as founding members 35 European institutions which specialized in Latin America – research and documentation centres, libraries and NGOs – from Austria, Belgium, France, Germany, Netherlands, Spain and UK.
