= Florence Cassez =

French woman convicted of kidnapping

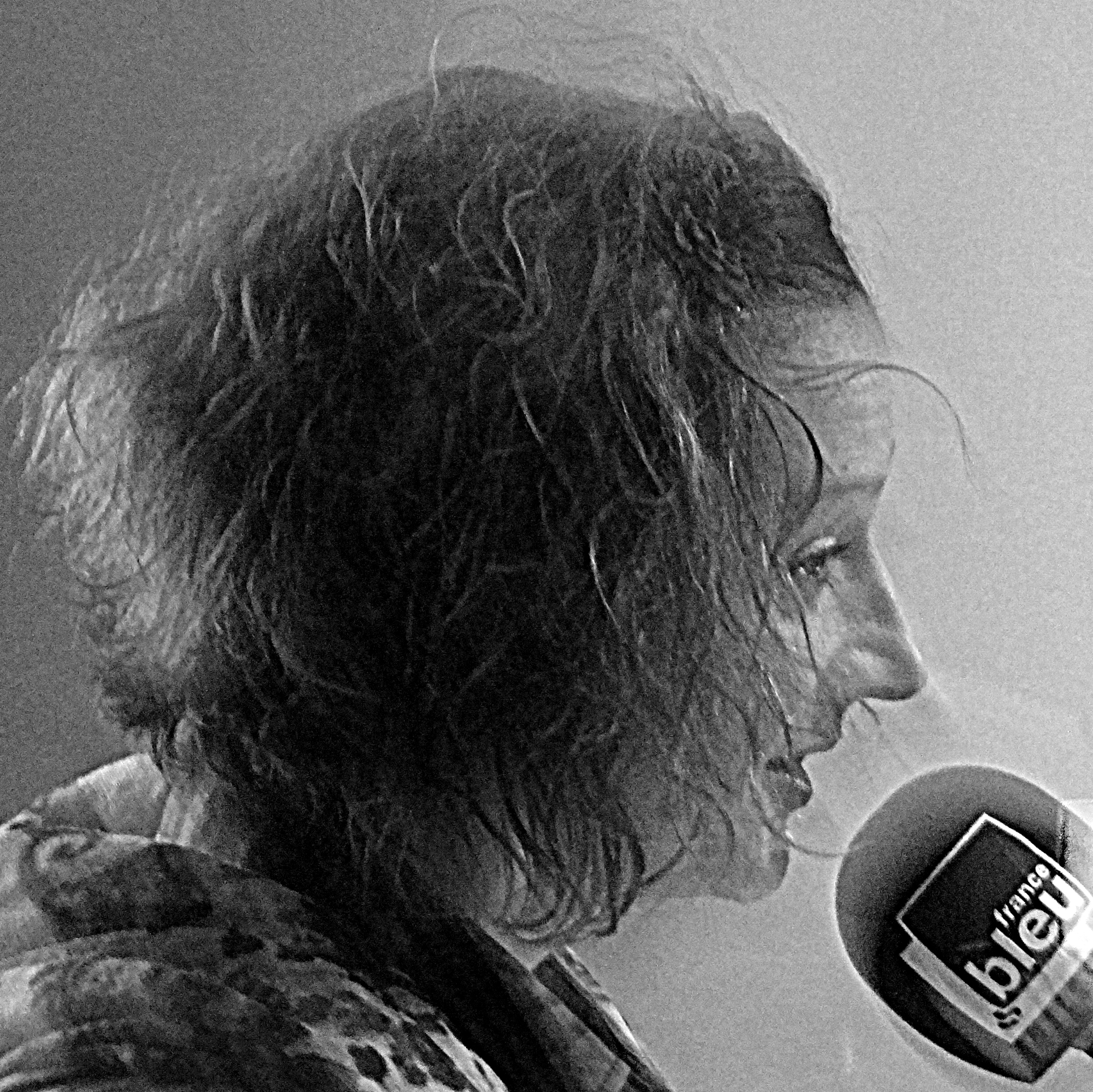
- Florence Cassez on Rencontre en Nord on France Bleu Nord in 2014
- Born: Florence Marie Louise Cassez Crépin; 17 November 1974 (age 51); Lille, France
- Spouse: Israel Vallarta (partner)
- Parent(s): Bernard Cassez and Charlotte Crepin
- Status: Released from prison
- Conviction: Overturned
- Criminal charges: Kidnapping, organized crime and illegal possession of firearms
- Penalty: 60 years (conviction absolved)

Florence Marie Louise Cassez Crépin (born 17 November 1974) is a French woman who was convicted in Mexico for her alleged involvement with the kidnapping gang Los Zodíacos. She was sentenced to 60 years in prison for kidnapping, organized crime, and illegal possession of firearms. The case, along with a possible extradition to France, generated diplomatic tensions between both countries. Cassez denied all charges.

On 23 January 2013, the Supreme Court of Justice of the Nation ordered her immediate release after determining that authorities had violated her rights by staging her arrest for the media the day after it actually occurred. She was repatriated to France on 24 January 2013.

== Relationship with Israel Vallarta ==
In 2003, Cassez arrived in Mexico legally as a tourist, to live and work with her brother who was there with his Mexican wife. She met Israel Vallarta the following year through her brother. The pair began a difficult relationship that alienated her friends, who sensed that he was trouble. She returned to France in the summer of 2005 but Vallarta contacted her and she returned to Mexico to live at his ranch. Cassez found a job in a hotel and looked for an apartment closer to her job.

== Arrest ==
Cassez's arrest took place on 8 December 2005 on the Mexico City-Cuernavaca Highway, as she rode with Vallarta. She had been living with him, and they were most times seen together. She was detained overnight, then moved to Vallarta's house in the early morning hours of 9 December 2005. The Federal Investigations Agency, which had tipped off several journalists, staged a fake arrest that TV crews from the Mexican networks Televisa and TV Azteca reported live by Carlos Loret de Mola. Three kidnapped victims were freed and four persons—including Cassez—arrested. Cassez was then presented as a member of the kidnapping gang "Los Zodíacos", something she has always denied. Vallarta, who was the leader of the kidnapping band, also stated that Cassez had nothing to do with his kidnapping activity. Mexican public opinion is divided between those who believe she is "undoubtedly guilty," and those who believe the Felipe Calderón administration was using her as a scapegoat. There was also a debate whether judges should give preference to the legal procedure over justice, and so free Cassez, as demanded by Nicolas Sarkozy. The main irregularity was on legal procedures regarding the procedures to arrest an individual.

A few weeks later, during a live television show, Cassez called and confronted the head of Mexican Federal Police, Genaro García Luna, with the truth about the staged arrest. In the weeks that followed, Daniel Cabeza de Vaca, the Attorney General of Mexico, was forced to admit that the arrest seen on TV was staged. He also tried to shift the blame on journalists, claiming they had requested it. As a result, one journalist, Pablo Reinah, was fired by his TV network. Reinah filed a lawsuit for defamation. In March 2007, the Mexican justice ruled that Reinah had no knowledge that the arrest of Cassez and Vallarta was staged.

Since August 2006, an official probe has been launched by the Mexican police against the federal agents who arrested Cassez. On 21 March 2012, three Ministers of the Mexican Supreme Court, concluded that many fundamental rights of Florence Cassez were violated during her arrest. Later that week the Procuraduría General de la República declared that it would start an investigation to search for those responsible of violating her fundamental rights and for staging the arrest.

== Investigation and trial ==
The Federal Police claimed that three victims were held hostage in the ranch where Cassez lived from September to December 2005, which belonged to Israel Vallarta. However, a couple who owned a restaurant nearby declared that they had the keys to the ranch and that a few days before the arrest staged by the police, they could detect no victims or any suspicious activity in the ranch.

The two judgments made by the Mexican tribunals are based on controversial testimonies.

=== Official testimonies ===
==== Cristina Rios Valladares' Testimony ====
Cristina Ríos Valladares, and her 11-year-old son Cristián Hilario claimed that they were hostages of Florence Cassez. They were held hostage for 52 days, from 9 October 2005 to 9 December 2005. During their captivity, the victims were blindfolded and only heard the voices of their kidnappers. In their first declaration, they didn't recognize Cassez's voice. However the victims later changed their testimony claiming it was Cassez who would taunt them and torture them.

==== Ezequiel Elizalde's testimony ====
Ezequiel Elizalde was the third hostage freed during the staged arrest. He was held hostage for 65 days. In his testimony he claims he was sexually and physically abused by Cassez and her boyfriend. Elizalde also said they gave him baths while he was blind-folded and handcuffed. He also testified that Cassez threatened to cut off his finger and ear, and Cassez had even used a needle to anaesthetize his hand. Ezequiel Elizalde now lives in the US. He continues to maintain that Florence Cassez was one of his kidnappers.

==== Controversy over David Orozco's testimony ====
In May 2009, some Mexican TV networks aired a video provided by the Mexican Federal Police showing a statement by David Orozco, a man presented as a member of Los Zodíacos kidnapping gang. The man identified Cassez as one of the leaders of Los Zodíacos. However, in June 2010 a court document, signed by Judge Eduardo Javier Sáenz Hernández, surfaced, showing that Orozco later denied what he said on the video. He said he had been coerced into making the video statement by masked policemen who tortured him with electric shocks and threatened to kidnap his wife and his son. On the other hand, Isabel Miranda de Wallace, president of the association Alto al Secuestro (Stop the Kidnappings) stated that there have been many cases where Mexican kidnappers claim to have been tortured in order to exonerate themselves.

== Timeline ==
- 8 December 2005: Florence Cassez is arrested.
- 9 December: with TV crews filming, the police staged a "recreation" of a raid on the compound where already-freed hostages were "rescued" and Vallarta and Cassez were "arrested."
- 25 April 2008: Cassez is condemned to 96 years in prison. She is identified as guilty of the following: organized crime; illegal deprivation of three people's liberty; possession of firearms used exclusively by the army.
- 2 March 2009: The sentence is reduced to 76 years in prison, then to 60 years to conform to the Mexican legislation that sets this time span as the limit of incarceration.
- 2009: Cassez claims that the Strasbourg Convention, signed by Mexico, allows her to be transferred to a French jail. At French insistence, Mexico set up a committee of legal experts from France and Mexico to study the transfer. The request is ultimately denied because in France she would not have 60 years in jail as in Mexico, and because France can not ensure the punishment, she must stay in Mexico.
- In August 2010, lawyers for Florence Cassez file an appeal to the Mexican Supreme Court, arguing that her arrest was unconstitutional and that her rights were violated.
- 10 February 2012: the appeals court upholds her conviction for kidnapping.
- 21 March 2012: the Mexican Supreme court rejects, 3–2, Florence Cassez' release petition.
- 22 January 2013: the Mexican Supreme court accepts, 3–2, Florence Cassez' release petition, without trial.
- 23 January 2013: Florence Cassez is freed and immediately flown back to France.

== Appeal to the Mexican Supreme Court ==
In August 2010, Florence Cassez's lawyers filed an appeal to the Mexican Supreme Court, arguing that the arrest of Cassez is unconstitutional and that the rights of their client were violated.

Initiated on 30 August 2010 by Florence Cassez's lawyers, the appeal en amparo is the equivalent for the court of last resort. The verdict pronounced soon by the Seventh Collegiate Tribunal in the penal case covers formal points rather than the charge, which remains the same. The court of last resort covers points on form. The request is directly addressed at the authority that pronounced the judgment, which transfers it to a district collegial tribunal of three magistrates.

The three magistrates who deliberated on the Cassez case were: Ricardo Ojeda Bohorquez, President of the Collegiate Tribunal. Having received a doctorate of law of the National Autonomous University of Mexico (UNAM), he is a federal judge since 1992 and a circuit judge since 1997; Carlos Hugo Luna Ramos, judge rapporteur. He has been a judge of a circuit tribunal since 1987; Manuel Barcena Villanueava is a specialist in penal and constitutional law, who was appointed circuit judge in 2000 through an opposition competition.

For Florence Cassez, there were could be three possible scenarios: (1) The Seventh Circuit Tribunal could proclaim Florence Cassez innocent overturning the judgment of the court of appeals. This would result in her immediate release from prison and could return to France. This decision would have confirmed the suspicions of the defense concerning the faults in the form, but it would not affect the charges held against her; (2) The tribunal could have recognized some of the irregularities underlined in the court of last resort. In this case, new proceedings would be launched and the case would be re-examined while Cassez remained in custody; (3) The verdict could be reconfirmed; Florence Cassez would have to serve her sentence. In this case, the defense's arguments concerning the faults in the form would be judged not pertinent by the magistrates.

On 10 February 2011, an appeals court upheld her conviction (scenario 3) for kidnapping, The court said in a statement that her conviction and 60-year-sentence would stand. The court said prosecutors had proven Cassez's guilt in four 2005 kidnappings, and that irregularities alleged by her defense attorney had not hindered the case.

On 7 March 2012, the Supreme Court reporter proposes freeing Florence Cassez based on the following reasons; The non-respect of the presumption of innocence, the non-respect of consular rights and the delay in presentation before the justice. A decision by five judges to whom the request was delivered is expected for 21 March, according to the Cassez' lawyer.

On 21 March 2012, the Supreme Court rejected the appeal and proposal of freeing Cassez by a 3-2 decision. The court accepted there was police misconduct and violations of Cassez's rights after her detention. The court asked Judge Olga Sanchez to review the case, which could lead to a re-trial.

In January 2013, the Supreme Court accepted her release petition, and she was free to return to France from the Tepepan prison. Her ex-partner, Israel Vallarta, confirmed that she knew nothing about the people who were kidnapped, and was not related to the case. He was acquitted on July 31, 2025, and released from prison the day after. The kidnapping story has been turned into a Netflix series.

== Impact on French-Mexican relations ==
On 9 March 2009, during French president Nicolas Sarkozy's visit to Mexico, he requested that Cassez be transferred to a French prison, something she may be entitled to under the 1983 Strasbourg Convention on the Transfer of Sentenced Persons, signed by both France and Mexico. Felipe Calderón agreed to setting up a binational committee to settle this matter. However, given that she has been sentenced to 61 years and that 20 years is the maximum prison term permitted in France, Mexico finally decided in June 2009 that Cassez would remain in Mexico to serve her full term.

Mexico cancelled its participation of 2011 "The Year of Mexico in France" (350 events, films, and symposia planned) as Sarkozy declared that this year-long event was going to be dedicated to Cassez, and each individual event would have some sort of remembrance of the French woman.

France presented the issue at the G-20 in 2012, when Mexico took over from France as head of the grouping.

== Public opinion in Mexico ==
Most Mexicans consider Cassez to be guilty, since she was indicted on the charges brought against her and freed on technical grounds. Only 10% of Mexicans polled believe in her innocence. For some Mexicans, the Cassez affair is a case of crime and punishment, and for others is a matter of administration of justice. Intellectuals, such as Denise Dresser, Carmen Aristegui, and Jorge Volpi, are among those who advocate liberty for Cassez, based on the illegality of the process. On the other hand, anti-crime activist Isabel Miranda de Wallace, former candidate for Mexico City's mayorship and mother of a son who was kidnapped and killed, is among those who claim that victim rights are more important than the Cassez affair.

== In popular culture ==
A 2022 documentary, "A Kidnapping Scandal: The Florence Cassez Affair", describes the case and includes interviews with Cassez. It is based on the book "Una novela criminal" (A criminal novel) by Jorge Volpi.
