= Eugenio Mier y Concha =

Mexican politician

Deputy of the Congress of the Union for Tabasco's 4th district
- In office 1 September 2003 – 31 August 2006
- Preceded by: Rosalinda López Hernández
- Succeeded by: Fernando Mayans Canabal

Personal details
- Born: 25 December 1949 (age 76) Nacajuca, Tabasco, Mexico
- Party: PRI
- Education: UJAT
- Occupation: Politician

Eugenio Mier y Concha Campos (born 25 December 1949) is a Mexican politician affiliated with the Institutional Revolutionary Party (PRI).

In the 2003 mid-terms he was elected to the Chamber of Deputies to represent Tabasco's 4th district during the 59th session of Congress, and previously served as municipal president of Nacajuca.
