= Canabal =

Canabal is a Spanish surname. Notable people with the surname include:

- Fernando Mayans Canabal (born 1963), Mexican politician
- Manuel Canabal (born 1974), Spanish footballer
- Tomás Garrido Canabal (1891–1943), Mexican politician
