= Hernán Bermúdez Requena =

Mexican former government official

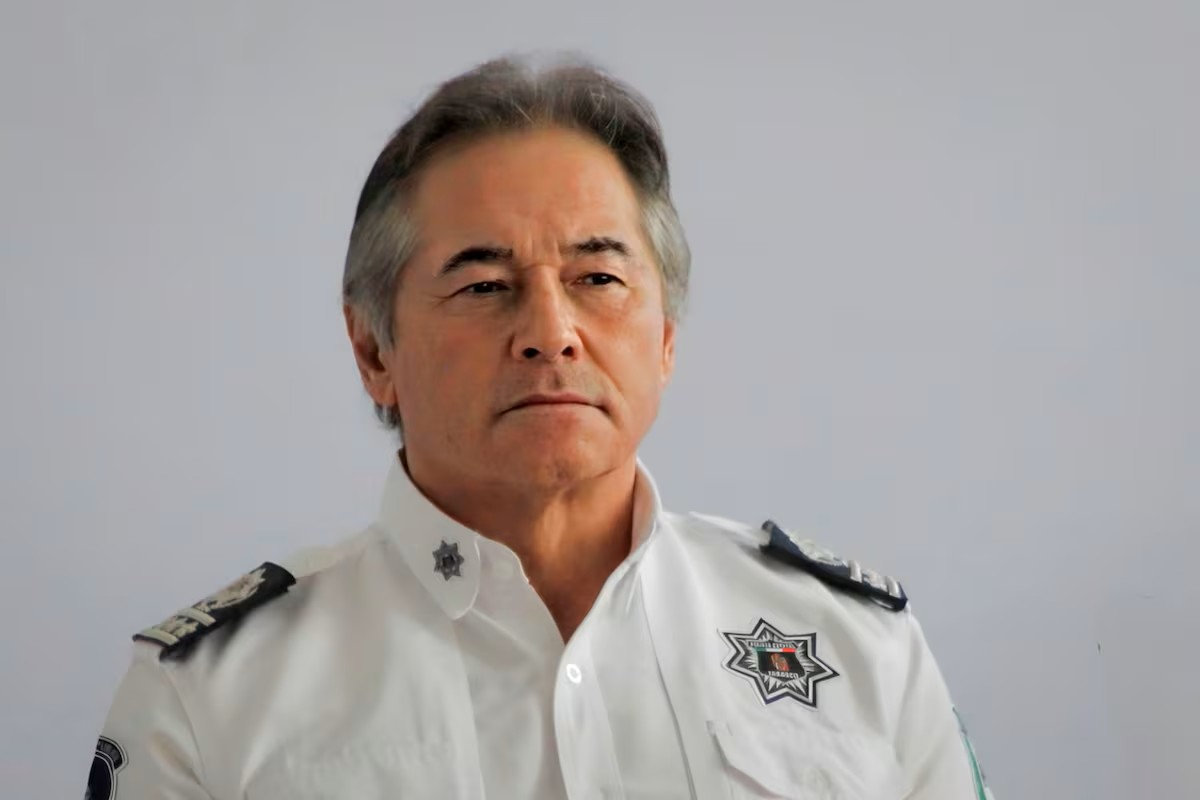

Secretary of Security and Citizen Protection of Tabasco
- In office 11 December 2019 – 5 January 2024
- Governor: Adán Augusto López Hernández; Carlos Manuel Merino Campos
- Preceded by: Ángel Mario Balcázar Martínez
- Succeeded by: José del Carmen Castillo Ramírez

Personal details
- Born: 30 September 1953 (age 73) Mérida, Yucatán, Mexico
- Party: Morena (2023–2025, expelled)
- Education: National Autonomous University of Mexico (Law degree, 1991)
- Occupation: Politician, former government official
- Criminal information
- Status: Detained, awaiting trial
- Criminal charges: Criminal association, kidnapping, extortion (state charges); Organized crime, money laundering (federal charges), drug trafficking, murder for hire

Hernán Bermúdez Requena (born 30 September 1953) is a Mexican former government official and politician who served as Secretary of Security and Citizen Protection of Tabasco from 2019 to 2024. He is currently detained and facing criminal charges related to alleged leadership of the criminal organization "La Barredora" (The Sweeper), which authorities link to the Jalisco New Generation Cartel (CJNG).

Bermúdez was arrested in Paraguay on 12 September 2025 and subsequently expelled from that country to Mexico on 17 September 2025. He is currently imprisoned at the Federal Social Readaptation Center No. 1 (Altiplano) maximum security prison in Almoloya de Juárez, State of Mexico, facing charges that could result in a sentence of up to 158 years in prison.

== Early life and education ==
Hernán Bermúdez Requena was born on 30 September 1953 in Mérida, Yucatán. He studied law at the National Autonomous University of Mexico (UNAM), graduating with his law degree in 1991.

His law thesis, titled La institución del Ministerio Público Federal y su transformación a la dinámica social actual ("The Institution of the Federal Public Ministry and its Transformation to Current Social Dynamics") proposed implementing what he termed sana censura ("healthy censorship") in mass media to protect societal values. He is the brother of businessman Humberto Bermúdez Requena, who has been identified as having obtained public works contracts during various administrations in Tabasco.

== Political and law enforcement career ==
=== Early positions ===
Bermúdez Requena began his career in state government in the early 1990s during the administration of Governor Manuel Gurría Ordóñez. He held various security-related positions throughout his career, including:

- Director of Public Security in 1992
- Director of the Centro de Readaptación Social (Social Readaptation Center) of Tabasco from 1995 to 1997
- Undersecretary of Prevention, Social Readaptation and Civil Protection from 2001 to 2005
- Director of the Investigation Police of the State Attorney General's Office in 2019

=== Secretary of Security and Citizen Protection ===
Bermúdez Requena served as Secretary of Security and Citizen Protection of Tabasco after being appointed by Governor Adán Augusto López Hernández. He served in this capacity through the administrations of both López Hernández (2019–2021) and his successor, Carlos Manuel Merino Campos (2021–2024), before resigning on 5 January 2024.

During his tenure, Bermúdez publicly denied that drug cartels operated in Tabasco, despite intelligence documents from the Secretariat of National Defense (SEDENA) from 2019 and 2022—later leaked by the Guacamaya collective—that linked him to organized crime.

== Drug trafficking allegations and arrest ==
=== Intelligence reports and investigations ===
According to leaked military intelligence documents, Bermúdez allegedly operated as the leader of "La Barredora", a criminal organization functioning as an operational arm of the Jalisco New Generation Cartel in Tabasco. The organization was allegedly involved in drug trafficking, extortion ("cobro de piso"), fuel theft from Pemex facilities, human trafficking, and retail drug sales.

Intelligence reports indicated that Bermúdez allegedly gave instructions to criminal leaders about when and where to conduct extortion, whom to assassinate or torture, and where to abandon bodies. Leaked documents also stated that he allegedly ordered that murders committed by La Barredora be carried out in the neighboring state of Chiapas to avoid increasing Tabasco's crime statistics, a practice reportedly called Sembrando Vidas ("Sowing Lives").

A previous arrest occurred in 2006 when the Subprocuraduría de Investigación Especializada en Delincuencia Organizada (SIEDO) detained Bermúdez for alleged participation in the kidnapping and murder of rancher Ponciano Vázquez Lagunes, the brother of Veracruz cacique Cirilo Vázquez Lagunes.

=== Flight from Mexico and international manhunt ===
On 14 February 2025, a state arrest warrant was issued against Bermúdez for criminal association, extortion, and express kidnapping. According to authorities, he fled Mexico on 26 January 2025, traveling from Mérida, Yucatán, to Panama, then reportedly to Spain and Brazil before arriving in Paraguay.

On 17 July 2025, Interpol issued a Red Notice for Bermúdez, making him wanted in more than 190 countries.

=== Arrest in Paraguay and return to Mexico ===
Bermúdez was arrested on 12 September 2025 in the gated community of Surubi'i in Mariano Roque Alonso, near Asunción. The operation was conducted by Paraguay's National Anti-Drug Secretariat (SENAD), Intelligence Secretariat, and Public Prosecutor in cooperation with Mexican authorities. Authorities found him living in a luxury two-story mansion with a swimming pool, where they seized cash, gold bracelets, and other jewelry.

Paraguayan authorities stated that Bermúdez had attempted to establish a criminal network in Paraguay. After refusing to accept an abbreviated extradition process, Paraguay expelled him on 17 September 2025 due to irregular entry and stay in the country.

Bermúdez arrived at Toluca International Airport on the evening of 17 September 2025 and was transferred to the Altiplano maximum security prison around 23:00 local time. Upon arrival, he was served with both state and federal arrest warrants.

=== Legal proceedings ===
On 23 September 2025, Judge Ramón Adolfo Brown Ruiz of the Control Court of Judicial Region 9 in Villahermosa formally charged Bermúdez with criminal association, aggravated kidnapping, and extortion. The judge ratified preventive detention and granted prosecutors a three-month period for complementary investigation, concluding on 23 December 2025.

Óscar Tonatiuh Vázquez Landeros, the Attorney General of Tabasco, stated that if convicted, Bermúdez could face 50 to 100 years for kidnapping, 7.5 to 18 years for criminal association, and 20 to 40 years for extortion, totaling a possible sentence of up to 158 years in prison. He also faces separate federal charges for organized crime and money laundering.

== Political party affiliation and expulsion ==
Bermúdez joined the National Regeneration Movement (Morena) party in 2023, though he had worked with the party since earlier years.

On 2 October 2025, Morena officially expelled Bermúdez from the party, canceling his membership registration. Party president Luisa María Alcalde stated that Morena had opened the investigation into Bermúdez and emphasized that there would be no impunity for party members involved in criminal activities.

== See also ==
- Jalisco New Generation Cartel
- Adán Augusto López Hernández
- Genaro García Luna
- Organized crime in Mexico
