= Rosalinda López Hernández =

Mexican politician (1967–2024)

First Lady of Chiapas
- In role 8 December 2018 – 5 June 2024
- Governor: Rutilio Escandón
- Preceded by: Anahí Puente

Deputy of the Congress of Tabasco Plurinominal
- In role 5 September 2012 – 4 September 2015
- Constituency: Proportional representation

Senator of the Congress of the Union for Tabasco Second Formula
- In role 1 September 2006 – 31 August 2012
- Preceded by: Óscar Cantón Zetina
- Succeeded by: Fernando Mayans Canabal
- Constituency: Tabasco

Deputy of the Congress of Tabasco
- In role 1 January 2004 – 31 August 2006
- Succeeded by: Amalín Yabur Elias
- Constituency: Tabasco local electoral district 20

Deputy of the Congress of the Union
- In role 1 September 2000 – 31 August 2003
- Preceded by: Francisco Alberto Rabelo Cupido
- Succeeded by: Eugenio Mier y Concha Campos
- Constituency: Tabasco's 4th federal district

Personal details
- Born: 12 August 1967 Cárdenas, Tabasco, Mexico
- Died: 5 June 2024 (aged 56) Villahermosa, Tabasco, Mexico
- Party: PRD (2000–2017); MORENA
- Spouse: Rutilio Escandón (m. 2013)
- Relatives: Adán Augusto López Hernández (brother)
- Education: BA, MA
- Alma mater: Universidad Juárez Autónoma de Tabasco; Autonomous University of Madrid
- Occupation: Public accountant

Rosalinda López Hernández (12 August 1967 – 5 June 2024) was a Mexican politician. She held membership in the party Movimiento Regeneración Nacional (Morena), after earlier having belonged to the Party of the Democratic Revolution (Partido de la Revolución Democrática, PRD). She occupied the posts of local deputy, federal deputy and federal senator for Tabasco, and in Andrés Manuel López Obrador's government she was the Administrator General of Fiscal Audit of the Servicio de Administración Tributaria (SAT; "Tax Administration Service").

== Life ==
López Hernández was born on 12 August 1967 in Cárdenas, Tabasco, Mexico.

She was a public accountant by virtue of a degree in that field from the Universidad Juárez Autónoma de Tabasco (UJAT) and held a master's degree in Economic Auditing, Finance and Accountancy from the Autonomous University of Madrid. She was lawyer and notary public Payambé López Falconi's daughter, and sister to Adán Augusto López Hernández, who like her was a deputy and a senator, and government secretary from 2021 to 2023; López Falconi and his children were from their earliest years personally and politically close to Andrés Manuel López Obrador; and she was governor of Chiapas (2018–2024) Rutilio Escandón Cadenas's wife.

== Career ==
=== Private sector ===
She pursued her professional career at first in the private sector as a partner and consultant in the offices of López y López Auditores, Consultores y Asesores, S.C.; in 1988 she was an accountant in the offices of Promotora y Asesoría S.A. de C.V., from 1988 to 1989 with Grupo Constructor Comal, S.A. de C.V., from 1989 to 1990 in the accounting offices of Bores Loring Auditores, S.A., from 1990 to 1991 in the offices of José Guadalupe Rodríguez Bonfil, and from 1992 to 1993 she was a member of the Fiscal Commission of the Employers' Confederation of the Mexican Republic (Confederación Patronal de la República Mexicana; COPARMEX) -Tabasco. From 1999 to 2000 she was treasurer of the Tabasco College of Public Accountants, after having been a member since 1992. Also in the 1990s, she worked as a columnist at two daily newspapers, Novedades de Tabasco and El Sureste.

=== Politics ===
In the PRD, López Hernández occupied the posts of national and state counsellor in Tabasco; in 2000 she was nominated and elected federal deputy for Tabasco's 4th district to the 58th Congress, an office lasting from this year until 2003, and in which she held positions as Secretary of the Treasury and Public Credit Commission and as Member of both the Commission for Vigilance of the Federation's Higher Auditing and the Committee of the Centre of Public Finance Studies, as well as being a member of the Friendship With India Group and of the Latin American Parliament's (PARLATINO) Emerging Economies Commission.

After her term in this office came to an end, she was elected in the 2003 Tabasco state elections for the first time as a deputy to the Congress of Tabasco, representing Local District 20 in the LVIII Legislature of the Congress of Tabasco, and as such she was the president of the Finance and Budget Commission as well as a member of the Governance Commission, the Constitutional Point Commission and the first Financial Oversight Commission.

In the 2006 general election, López Hernández was elected as a senator in the second round of voting for the 2006–2012 term, corresponding with the 59th and 60th sessions of Congress, in which she functioned as President of the Parliamentary Rules and Practices Commission, Secretary of the External Relations and Social Security Commissions and member of the Finance and Public Credit, the External Relations—Europe, the Population and Development and the Water Resources Commissions.

She did not serve out her full term, instead asking for permanent leave beginning on 1 March 2012 to stand for the second time as a candidate for the PRD for a seat in the Congress of Tabasco in the state elections to be held that same year, which saw her elected by proportional representation to the LXI Tabasco State Legislature, which would end in 2015. In that year, she forsook her PRD militancy and accepted a candidacy from the National Action Party (Partido Acción Nacional, PAN) and the Ecologist Green Party of Mexico (Partido Verde Ecologista de México, PVEM) for the municipal presidency (mayoralty) of Centro in the 2015 state elections; she did not win, however, losing to Gerardo Gaudiano Rovirosa, the PRD and New Alliance candidate, and ending up in third place among voters' preferences.

This election, however, ended up being annulled by the Federal Electoral Tribunal.

== Death ==
López Hernández died on 5 June 2024 at the age of 56, only three days after being elected for the second time as a senator for the state of Tabasco. She had won re-election as one of Tabasco's senators in the 2024 Senate election, occupying first place on the National Regeneration Movement's two-name formula.
