= Genaro García Luna =

Mexican politician and convicted felon (born 1968)

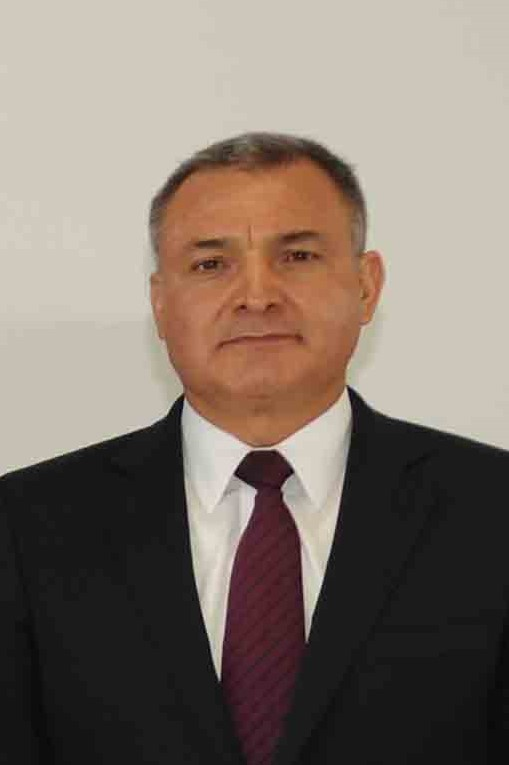
- García Luna in 2012

Secretary of Public Security of Mexico
- In office 1 December 2006 – 30 November 2012
- President: Felipe Calderón
- Preceded by: Eduardo Medina-Mora Icaza
- Succeeded by: Manuel Mondragón y Kalb

Director of the Federal Investigation Agency
- In office 1 November 2001 – 30 November 2006
- President: Vicente Fox
- Preceded by: Position established
- Succeeded by: Ardelio Vargas Fosado

Personal details
- Born: 10 July 1968 (age 58) Mexico City, Mexico
- Spouse: Linda Cristina Pereyra (m. 2008)
- Children: 2
- Education: Universidad Autónoma Metropolitana (BS)
- Criminal information
- Allegiance: Sinaloa Cartel
- Convictions: Drug trafficking; Organized crime; False statements
- Penalty: 38 years in federal prison

Details
- Date apprehended: 10 December 2019
- Imprisoned at: ADX Florence

Genaro García Luna (Note: In this Spanish name, the first or paternal surname is García and the second or maternal family name is Luna.) (born 10 July 1968) is a Mexican former government official and convicted drug trafficker. From 2006 to 2012, he served as secretary of public security during the administration of Felipe Calderón. He was later found to have used his high-ranking role to favor the Sinaloa Cartel to engage in drug trafficking activities during the Mexican drug war.

In the 2018 trial of the drug lord Joaquín "El Chapo" Guzmán Loera, his partner Jesús Zambada García testified to bribing García Luna with suitcases stuffed with US$3 million in cash on two occasions. On 9 December 2019, García Luna was arrested in the United States on charges of taking bribes from the Sinaloa Cartel. On 21 February 2023, García Luna was found guilty of all five counts by a federal jury in Brooklyn, New York, making the once-highest-ranking law enforcement official in Mexico now a convicted felon. In October 2024, he was sentenced to 38 years in prison. He is currently imprisoned at ADX Florence with a release date of 19 July 2052.

== Early life and education ==
García Luna was born in Mexico City. He holds a B.Sc. in Mechanical Engineering from the Autonomous Metropolitan University (UAM) and a Diploma in Strategic Planning from the Accountancy and Administration Faculty of the National Autonomous University of Mexico (UNAM). He completed a Master of Business Administration (MBA) from the University of Miami in May 2015.

== Career ==
In 1989, García Luna started his career in intelligence at the National Intelligence Centre (CISEN), where he worked in the Counterintelligence and Terrorism departments under President Carlos Salinas de Gortari. In 1998, he became the Coordinator-General for Intelligence of the Federal Preventive Police, where he helped design the framework for intelligence areas and their executive integration.

In 2000, he was named Director for Planning and Operation for the Federal Judicial Police, where he introduced administrative structures and operational concepts. In 2001, García Luna was appointed founder and director general of the Federal Investigation Agency (AFI). As head of the AFI, he faced widespread criticism after it was revealed that a 2005 police raid, televised as a live operation to rescue kidnapping victims, had been staged. The alleged kidnappers, including French national Florence Cassez, had been detained the previous day and held without due process for nearly 20 hours, with one claiming he was tortured. Genaro Luna was also in charge of announcing the arrests of serial killers Raúl Osiel Marroquín and Juana Barraza in the same week of January 2006. Marroquín and Barraza committed separate serial murders in Mexico City and were arrested two days apart.

He has authored several books on policing, including Contra el Crimen (2006), emphasizing intelligence-driven reforms, and El Nuevo Modelo de Seguridad para México (2011), which outlines Mexico's national security policy since the beginning of the Mexican drug war. As Secretary of Public Security from 2006 to 2012, García Luna founded the Federal Police Force in 2009, which operated under his vision.

After leaving government service, García Luna became a consultant and businessman focused on evaluating Mexico and Latin America's social, political, and economic conditions. He became a partner in GLAC, which provides a risk and security assessment index used by the business community to evaluate conditions across Mexico. The GLAC index is published in El Heraldo de México and El Financiero. In 2015, García Luna was nominated to the Board of SecureAlert, Inc., a Utah-based company specializing in offender monitoring, which is controlled by Sapinda Asia, Ltd., and Lars Windhorst, who held a majority stake in the company.

== Financial transparency ==
García Luna has been unable to account for his wealth, which includes luxury homes and real estate in Mexico City. These assets would be beyond the means of a civil servant's salary. In 2013, García Luna was listed among the "10 Most Corrupt Mexicans" by Forbes, to which he responded with a letter to Steve Forbes, accusing the publication of basing his inclusion on falsehoods and lacking journalistic integrity.

Further allegations emerged during the 2018 trial of Joaquín "El Chapo" Guzmán, when the brother of El Chapo's former partner, Ismael "El Mayo" Zambada, testified that García Luna had been bribed with suitcases containing US$3 million in cash on two occasions. This testimony further fueled accusations of García Luna's ties to organized crime.

== Trial ==
On 9 December 2019, García Luna was arrested in Dallas, Texas, on charges of taking millions in bribes from the Sinaloa Cartel. At that time, it was also reported that the Attorney General of Mexico (FGR) was looking to extradite him to Mexico on related charges. The New York Times reported that the prosecution intended to introduce 75 kilograms (165 lb) of cocaine and 4 kg of heroin confiscated in four raids as evidence against García Luna. They also planned to use financial records and intercepted communications at the trial beginning on 30 July 2020.

U.S. courts denied García Luna's requests for release on bond in March and April 2020. Roberta S. Jacobson, the former U.S. ambassador to Mexico (2016–2018), asserted on 3 May 2020 that the Calderón government knew of Genaro García Luna's ties with the Sinaloa Cartel. Former president Felipe Calderón insisted they did not. He pleaded not guilty to the charges against him on 7 October 2020. On 21 February 2023, a Brooklyn jury found him guilty of all charges. On 16 October 2024, he was sentenced to 38 years imprisonment. He is the highest-ranking Mexican official ever to be convicted in the United States.

On 22 May 2025, a court in Florida ordered García Luna and his wife, Linda Cristina Pereyra, to pay US$2.448 billion in damages to the Mexican government.

== Brooklyn Detention Center ==
One of his cellmates at the Brooklyn Detention Center is Sam Bankman-Fried: allegedly, the two "communicate warmly" with each other. Another inmate in the dormitory at the Brooklyn Detention Center is the former Honduran president Juan Orlando Hernández.

== See also ==
- Cabinet of Felipe Calderón
- Florence Cassez
- Hernán Bermúdez Requena

== Bibliography ==
- ¿Por qué 1,661 corporaciones de policía no bastan? – Pasado, Presente y Futuro de la Policía en México. Primera Edición, abril de 2006 (Impreso en México / Derechos Reservados). ISBN 970-03-2089-8 / Copyright © 2006 Ing. Genaro García Luna
- Para entender: El Nuevo Modelo de Seguridad para México. Primera Edición: Nostras Ediciones, 2011 (www.nostraediciones.com. ISBN 978-607-7603-76-4 / Copyright © 2011 Nostra Ediciones S.A. de C.V. (Ing. Genaro García Luna)
