= Raúl Osiel Marroquín =

Mexican serial killer (born 1980)

- Marroquín in 2006
- Born: Raúl Osiel Marroquín Reyes; 1 September 1980 (age 46); Tampico, Tamaulipas, Mexico
- Other names: The Sadist (Note: Spanish: El Sádico); The Rainbow Killer (Note: Spanish: El Asesino del Arcoíris)
- Occupation: Former Mexican Army officer (first sergeant)
- Status: Incarcerated
- Convictions: Murder x4; Kidnapping x6; Hate crime
- Penalty: 280 years in prison

Details
- Victims: 4
- Span of crimes: September – December 2005
- Country: Mexico
- State: Mexico City
- Date apprehended: 23 January 2006
- Imprisoned at: Santa Martha Acatitla Prison, Mexico City

Raúl Osiel Marroquín Reyes (born 1 September 1980), known as The Sadist and The Rainbow Killer, is a Mexican serial killer who kidnapped and tortured six young men in 2005, killing four of them.

An organized killer, Marroquín was motivated by his sheer hatred for gay men, luring them from Mexico City's Zona Rosa and taking them to his apartment where he would brutally torture the youths before killing them. His case is regarded as an infamous example of homophobia in Mexico. (Note: Marroquín's case led to debate about this issue in Mexico, including the treatment by media, which initially nicknamed Marroquín El Matajotos, which in Spanish stands as The Fags' Killer.)

== Early life, military career and early crimes ==
Raúl Osiel Marroquín Reyes was born on 1 September 1980 in Tampico, in the state of Tamaulipas, the son of Roberto Marroquín and Gloria Reyes. His father was described as cold and extremely homophobic, inculcating the hatred for gay men in young Marroquín since an early age. Although Marroquín refused to address the coldness and lack of affection in his childhood, his father was known for the authoritarian behavior while raising him.

After finishing secondary school, Marroquín joined the Mexican Army in January 1999 in a military unit in Tamaulipas, where he was ultimately assigned to the 15th Infantry Battalion, achieving the rank of first sergeant by the time he retired from the Army in May 2004. While serving in the military, Marroquín pursued a career in medicine at a university in Mexico City; however, he dropped out by the time of his discharge from the Army, citing lack of economic resources to afford the studies. Frustrated over his lack of progress in life projects, Marroquín returned to his native Tamaulipas, where he was soon involved in violent armed robberies in a desperate way that he sought to get money.

That same month of May 2004, Marroquín was arrested in Tamaulipas over an armed robbery and spent 14 months in prison. Upon his release in August 2005 and infuriated over the time he served in jail, Marroquín decided to move away and permanently settled in Mexico City. In the capital, Marroquín became involved with his criminal partner, a man named Juan Enrique Madrid Manuel. Soon afterwards, they both moved to an apartment in Colonia Asturias, where they began to rob people at gunpoint in order to get money. Craving for money and strong dislike for gay men, Marroquín's violence began to escalate by late 2005.

== Kidnappings and murders ==
=== Juan Carlos Alfaro Alba ===
Marroquín's first victim was a 28-year-old gay man named Juan Carlos Alfaro Alba, whom Marroquín met on 21 October 2005 in the Zona Rosa area. Lured to a motel under the excuse of spending time together, Alfaro was kept hostage inside the motel's room for a week, during which he was brutally tortured and beaten by Marroquín and Madrid. In those days of captivity, Marroquín blackmailed Alfaro's family, demanding a ransom for the young man's life.

After frustrated attempts at securing a ransom, Marroquín and Madrid decided to abandon an injured Alfaro in the motel, not before threatening him with death if he dared to attempt to identify them. Alfaro was one of two victims to survive Marroquín's ultimate obsession with torture and murder.

=== Jonathan Razo Ayala ===
A week after releasing Alfaro, Marroquín returned to Zona Rosa looking for another victim. This time, he was approached by 21-year-old Jonathan Razo Ayala, who was spending the night at the Neón gay bar of Zona Rosa. Marroquín would later boast that he had shaved and dressed neatly because he considered that gay men were easy targets, citing his belief that they were promiscuous and were drawn to him for his physical appearance. Using his charisma and manipulating Razo into believing that he was gay too, Marroquín convinced him to go with him to the apartment in Colonia Asturias.

Upon arriving and entering the apartment, Marroquín and Madrid ambushed and quickly subdued Razo, tying his hands and feet, placing a blindfold over his eyes, and locking him up inside one of the apartment's bedrooms. Over the period of 16 days, Marroquín and, to a lesser extent, Madrid, tortured Razo physically and psychologically. Marroquín described sadistic pleasure at suffocating the youth by placing a bag on his head until he fainted to make him regain consciousness before verbally humiliating him using homophobic slurs.

After contacting Razo's family, Marroquín demanded 50,000 Mexican pesos to secure the young man's release. Razo's family pleaded for time and managed to gather a considerably high sum of money. However, Marroquín had no intention of negotiating, and, on 12 November 2005, he murdered Razo by strangling him to death. Marroquín quickly put the body inside a black suitcase and abandoned Razo's remains near the Chabacano metro station.

=== Ricardo López Hernández ===
On 30 November 2005, Marroquín went again to Zona Rosa in search of another young man to take to his apartment. He met 23-year-old Ricardo López Hernández, who was an employee at a Mexico City café. In a similar way to his previous victims, Marroquín lured López into accompanying him to his apartment in Colonia Asturias. Using an embellished speech to seduce the young man, Marroquín made sure that they were not seen. When they arrived at Marroquín's residence, López was ambushed by Madrid and subsequently held inside a room with his hands and feet tied.

During the course of several days, Marroquín blackmailed López's family, who were able to collect 28,000 pesos. Marroquín managed to get the money and cut off communication with the man's relatives. On 9 December 2005, Marroquín murdered López because he was "tired of the whimpering and whining." He put the body inside a suitcase and left it in an isolated area near the Chabacano metro station.

When López's remains were found the following day, the Federal Investigations Agency (AFI) and the SIEDO opened an inquest into the murders of Razo and López. In an attempt to confuse investigators, Marroquín inflicted cuts on López's forehead and body, trying to make the crimes appear ritualistic.

=== José Ricardo Galindo Valdés ===
Four days after López's murder, Marroquín lured another youth named José Ricardo Galindo Valdés. When Galindo was taken to the Colonia Asturias apartment, Marroquín and Madrid brutally beat him, demanding phone numbers of his relatives to ask for a ransom. The man gave them the number of his mother, who pleaded with Marroquín to spare her son's life because she was not going to be able to collect the sum of money that Marroquín so quickly demanded.

Hours later, Marroquín decided to take Galindo away from the area and let him go, warning him against attempting to identify his captors. The reason behind Marroquín's decision not to kill Galindo has never been established.

=== Armando Rivas Pérez and Víctor Ángel Iván Gutiérrez Balderas ===
On 16 December 2005, Marroquín reached the frenzy of his criminality, kidnapping two men, one of whom he murdered that same day. That day, Marroquín went twice to Zona Rosa, looking for a victim. He lured 25-year-old Armando Rivas Pérez, taking him to Colonia Asturias and brutally beating him while asking to know phone numbers. After blackmailing Rivas's family and obtaining a partial payment, Marroquín murdered Rivas that afternoon, Rivas being the only one of his fatal victims to be killed on the same day that he was abducted. Marroquín put Rivas's body inside a canvas bag and kept the body inside the bedroom.

That night, Marroquín returned to Zona Rosa and lured Víctor Ángel Iván Gutiérrez Balderas into going with him to his apartment to share a private time. As in previous cases, Marroquín and Madrid ambushed Gutiérrez upon entering the apartment and tied his hands and feet. Marroquín subsequently blackmailed Gutiérrez's family for a period of six days, during which he also tortured the youth both physically and psychologically. Marroquín cashed eight thousand pesos, which was a considerably lower sum than his initial demand of 120,000 pesos. Marroquín decided to cut off communication with Gutiérrez's family and murdered him on 22 December 2005, placing his body inside a canvas bag.

== Arrest, confession, and psychological profile ==
A few days after killing Gutiérrez, Marroquín and Madrid abandoned Rivas's remains near the Chabacano metro station. In late December 2005 or early January 2006, Marroquín decided to discard the dismembered body of the last victim—Víctor Ángel Iván Gutiérrez Balderas—with the intention of dumping the remains in the area. This time, however, as Marroquín walked with the wheeled suitcase with Gutiérrez's remains inside, a police car passed by, which made Marroquín show signs of nervousness. His visible anxiety was noticed by a passer-by who saw him abandon the suitcase after the patrol car drove away. Intrigued, the passer-by waited for Marroquín to leave the area and checked the suitcase, finding Gutiérrez's body parts inside. After police arrived to the area, investigators followed the trace left behind by the suitcase's wheels, which led to Marroquín's apartment building.

Police collected evidence in the days that followed, closely monitoring Marroquín. On 23 January 2006, agents from the federal special forces conducted an operation and arrested Marroquín on the charge of kidnapping and murder. Following his capture, it was announced by then-AFI chief Genaro García Luna that Marroquín's accomplice Madrid had evaded arrest. García Luna described Marroquín's modus operandi and the brutality of his crimes, adding that investigations continued pending more charges. The arrest of Marroquín came two days before the capture of Juana Barraza, another serial killer active in Mexico City, known as The Old Lady Killer.

Marroquín did not deny the kidnappings and murders, however, saying at first that he was not homophobic. He later made it clear that he had targeted gay men on purpose, calling them "easy preys" because they were "promiscuous and trusted others easily." Marroquín justified his crimes by saying he had done society "a favor" by killing gay men, saying that they "spread HIV/AIDS" and adding that they "messed with children." Questioned on whether he felt sorry for the suffering of the victims and their families, Marroquín said that he had never thought about them, only expressing regrets at the grief of their families.

He has also stated that he is not gay, denying feelings of repressed homosexuality and a relationship with his accomplice Madrid. Marroquín additionally said that by killing gay men, he helped prevent the spread of HIV/AIDS, citing the case of one of his murder victims, who was HIV-positive.

Psychiatrists who evaluated Marroquín diagnosed him as a psychopath with no expression of remorse; he also showed rationalization and moral justification of his crimes, seeing them as "good for society." Professionals added that Marroquín was not psychotic. Evaluations pointed instead to an inflated ego, antisocial personality disorder, and malignant narcissism. Marroquín was further described as someone who "hunted" his victims, taking advantage of his military training to deceive vulnerable people.

== Trials and incarceration ==
Marroquín faced a total of four trials or proceedings between October 2006 and February 2010. In the first instance, he was tried in October 2006 for the kidnapping and aggravated murder of Ricardo López Hernández. Marroquín was found guilty, and the court sentenced him to 60 years in prison. In May 2007, the Attorney General's Office in Mexico City announced that Marroquín had been convicted of two other murder counts and totaled a penalty of 147 years in prison.

The third sentence against Marroquín was on 4 September 2008, when he was found guilty of more charges, and, in February 2010, judicial authorities finalized the remaining and pending charges. Marroquín was subsequently sentenced to a cumulative 280 years in prison. He was first incarcerated at a prison in Iztapalapa before being moved in 2010 to another penitentiary in Mexico City, where he continues to serve his sentence.

Marroquín's accomplice Juan Enrique Madrid Manuel remains at large and is considered a fugitive. Despite being a fugitive, the court that tried Marroquín also imposed similar sentences in absentia against Madrid.

During his trials, it was established that Marroquín kept souvenirs from his victims, especially their identification cards. Except for an interview in 2023, Marroquín has stated that he has no remorse for his actions. He also said that he would do it all again if set free, adding that he would sharpen his methods to avoid capture.

In July 2023, social activist Saskia Niño de Rivera interviewed Marroquín in prison. He denied suffering abuse in his childhood and rejected the hypothesis that he had internalized homophobia as a result of repressing his own homosexuality. Marroquín also denied this time torturing his victims, instead saying that he had "executed (them) by hanging." Pressed by Niño de Rivera on the issue of remorse, Marroquín maintained that he did not feel anything for the victims, insisting that he regretted the suffering of their families. He recalled that during one of the trials, the mother of one of the victims wept when she saw him in the courtroom. Marroquín stated that he felt sorry and apologized to the woman during the hearing. He apologized again during the interview with Niño de Rivera, saying that he understood why the victims' families hated him.

== Victims ==
In bold the murder victims.

#	Name	Age	Date of kidnapping	Date of murder
1	Juan Carlos Alfaro Alba	28	21 October 2005	–
2	**Jonathan Razo Ayala**	21	29 October 2005	12 November 2005
3	**Ricardo López Hernández**	23	30 November 2005	9 December 2005
4	José Ricardo Galindo Valdés	?	16 December 2005	–
5	**Armando Rivas Pérez**	25	16 December 2005	16 December 2005
6	**Víctor Ángel Iván Gutiérrez Balderas**	25	16 December 2005	22 December 2005

== See also ==
- Violence against LGBT people
- Homosexuality in Mexico
- Hate crime
- Homophobia
- List of serial killers by country
