= Oscar Athié =

Mexican singer

Óscar Eduardo Athié Furlong (born 3 February 1958) is a Mexican singer and songwriter of romantic ballads. He was a popular recording artist in Mexico during the 1980s, and his best-known song is "Fotografía" (1983). He stopped recording in the early 1990s to concentrate on the hospitality sector in Acapulco.

== Early life ==
Athié was born in Acapulco. He studied medicine at the Universidad Autónoma de Guadalajara, qualifying as a surgeon and obstetrician.

== Career ==
Athié turned professional in 1981 after winning La Voz, a singing competition run by the Mexico City newspaper El Heraldo de México; the actress Verónica Castro acted as his sponsor in the contest. The win led to a contract with the label Discos Gamma.

His debut album Conóceme ("Get to know me") appeared in 1982 and included "Perdóname por no poder quererte" ("I'm sorry I couldn't love you"), the first song he recorded and one of his own compositions. "Fotografía" ("Photograph"), released in 1983, became the song most closely associated with him.

In 1984 Athié reached the final of the OTI Festival with "Tengo que empezar a amarme un poco más" ("I have to start loving myself a little more"), which he had written himself.

Athié's relationship with the actress Érika Buenfil during the 1980s attracted press attention; Buenfil has said the two were together for around eleven years and that the relationship ended when Athié did not attend a family gathering arranged to announce their engagement. Athié has said that "Fotografía" was written after one of their separations.

As a songwriter he worked with Aleks Syntek and Omar Alfanno, among others. "Y ahora juntos" ("And now together"), co-written with Lorena Tassinari, was recorded as a duet with Yuri and later with Laura Flores and with Tassinari. He released eight albums between 1982 and 1990. In October 2010 Mexico's Society of Authors and Composers^{(es)} recognized his career.

== Later life ==
After leaving music Athié ran hotel and restaurant businesses in Acapulco. By 2014 he was deputy director of the Promotora Turística (State Tourism Agency) of Guerrero, the state where Acapulco is located.

In 2015 he described himself as returning to the city to invest as a restaurant partner in the Zona Dorada district.

In May 2014 he was detained in Acapulco by the Federal Ministerial Police in connection with alleged violations of Mexico's federal tax code, alleging that he had changed his registered fiscal address without notification and concealed accounting records involving approximately one million pesos (about 75230 U.S. dollars at the time). He was released three days later on bail of 20,000 pesos (about 1505 U.S. dollars at the time).

After Hurricane Otis struck Acapulco in October 2023, Athié joined a caravan of residents that travelled to Mexico City to request additional federal relief funding.

== Discography ==
=== Studio albums ===
Studio albums, 1982–1990
Year	Title	Translation	Label
1982	Conóceme	"Get to Know Me"	Gamma
1983	Quiero llenarme de ti	"I Want to Fill Myself with You"	Gamma
1984	Historias	"Stories"	Gamma
1985	Desde muy hondo	"From Very Deep Within"	Gamma
1986	Realidades	"Realities"	Gamma
1987	Eterna Navidad	"Christmas Eternal"	Gamma
1988	Encuentros	"Meetings"	Gamma
1990	Ilusión divina	"Divine Illusion"	Gamma

=== Selected songs ===
Songs released by Athié include:

- "Perdóname por no poder quererte" ("I'm sorry I couldn't love you")
- "Fotografía" ("Photograph")
- "Tengo que empezar a amarme un poco más" ("I have to start loving myself a little bit more")
- "Y ahora juntos" ("And now together")
- "La Marimorena", a traditional Christmas carol in the Spanish-speaking world
- "Soy tuyo" ("I'm yours")
- "Voy a amarte" ("I'm going to love you")
- "Nos equivocamos" ("We made a mistake")
