= Federales =

Spanglish word used to denote security forces

Federales is a slang term in English and Spanish languages referring to security forces, particularly those of the federal government of Mexico. The term gained widespread usage by English speakers due to being popularized by films as The Wild Bunch, The Treasure of the Sierra Madre, Guns of the Magnificent Seven, Blue Streak, the television drama series Breaking Bad and its spinoff prequel Better Call Saul, as well as the song "Pancho and Lefty" by Townes Van Zandt. The term is a cognate and counterpart to the slang "Feds" in the United States.

== Law enforcement ==
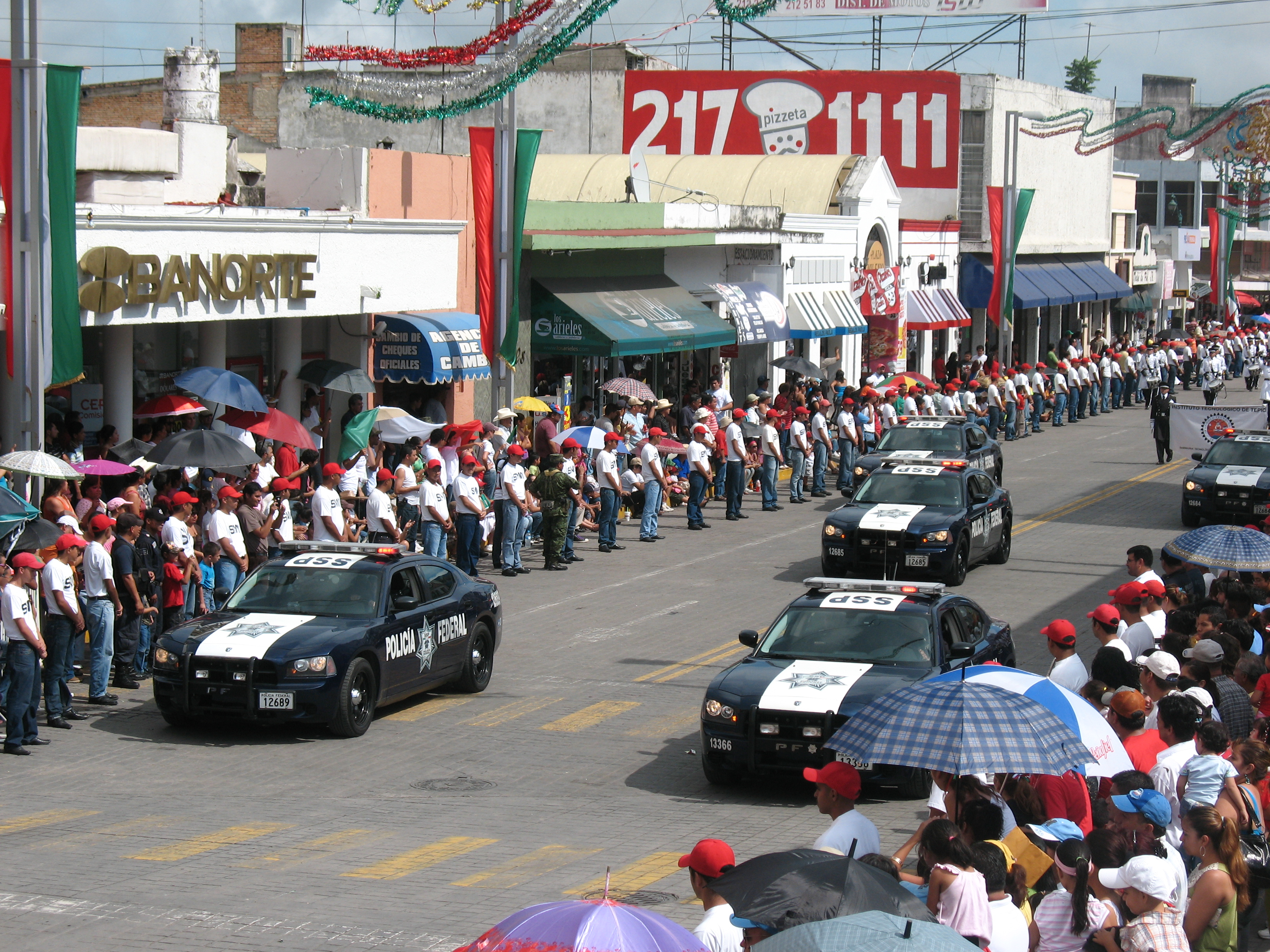
Federal Police vehicles in a parade in Tepic, Nayarit (2010)

The term is traditionally used for certain law enforcement agencies of the federal government of Mexico, such as the National Guard and its predecessor, the Federal Police, as well as the Federal Ministerial Police and any of its predecessors, the Federal Investigations Agency and Federal Judicial Police.

== Military ==
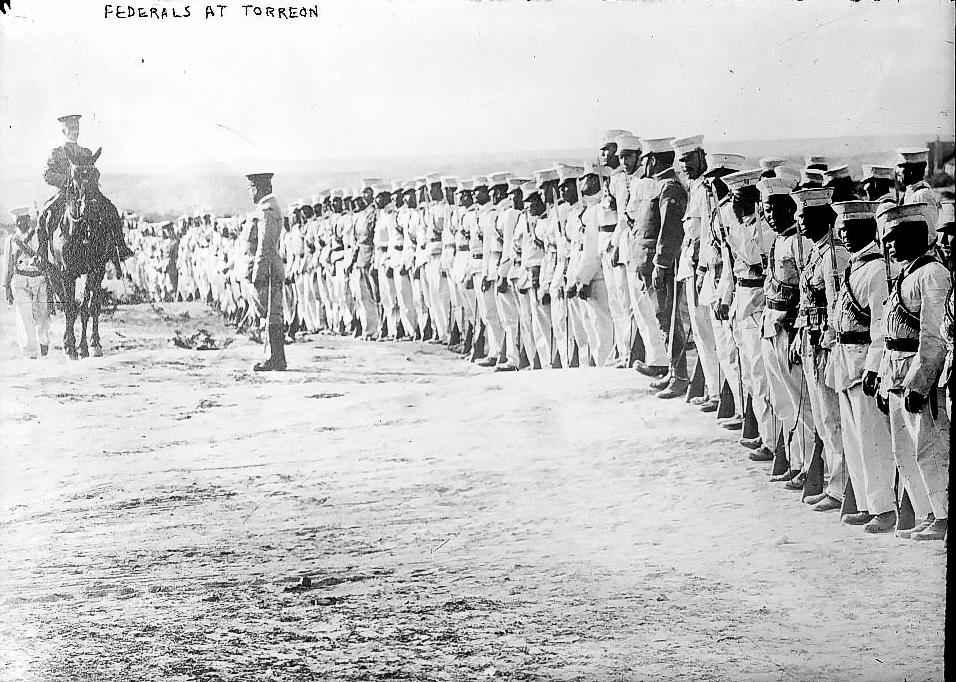
Federales in Torreón, Coahuila c. 1914, during the presidency of Victoriano Huerta.

Historically, "Federales" was also the common term used for the regular Mexican Army (or Federal Army), especially during the 34-year rule of Porfirio Díaz until 1911. In part the expression served the purpose of distinguishing centrally controlled military units from provincial militias, or the rural mounted police (rurales). Following Díaz's overthrow by rebel forces led by Francisco Madero, the Federal Army remained in existence. The Federales were eventually disbanded in July and August 1914, after Madero's successor Victoriano Huerta was in turn defeated by an alliance of revolutionary forces. The formal dissolution of the Federal Army was decreed by the Teoloyucan Treaties, signed on August 13, 1914.

== See also ==
- Policia Federal
