= La Barredora =

Mexican drug cartel

- Founded: 2008
- Founding location: Villahermosa, Tabasco, Mexico
- Years active: 2008–present
- Territory: Guerrero, Edomex, Puebla, Tabasco and Veracruz
- Ethnicity: Mexican
- Leader: Adán Augusto López
- Criminal activities: Drug trafficking, money laundering, extortion, murder, kidnapping, arms trafficking and fuel contraband
- Allies: Los Talibanes (Faction of Los Zetas in Central Mexico)
- Rivals: Independent Cartel of Acapulco; Mexico; United States

La Barredora ("The Sweeper Truck") is a criminal gang based in the Mexican state of Tabasco and its surrounding territories. The criminal group came into existence during the rapid decentralization of Mexico's drug trafficking organizations and as a split-off group of the Beltrán-Leyva Cartel. Originally, the Beltrán Leyva cartel operated in Acapulco, but the group gradually lost presence in Acapulco. After the Mexican military gunned down the top boss of the cartel – Arturo Beltrán Leyva – in December 2009, his brother Héctor Beltrán Leyva took control of one of the factions of the cartel and declared war on Edgar Valdez Villarreal, who had long been the right hand of Arturo. Amidst the violence, Valdez Villarreal tried to appoint a successor, but those in Acapulco broke off and formed their own criminal gang: the Independent Cartel of Acapulco. Within weeks, however, the group had splintered too, forming a new and rival group known as La Barredora. Villarreal Valdez was then captured by the Mexican Federal Police in August 2010, but the violence between the groups for the control of Acapulco continued.

The group's leader, Eder Jair Sosa Carvajal, nicknamed "El Cremas", founded the organization along with Christian Hernández Tarín, AKA "El Chris" (arrested on 18 October 2011) and Víctor Manuel Rivera Galeana, AKA "El Gordo" (on 4 November 2011).

The cartel's area of operations have centered on the resort area and port city of Acapulco. The cartel is known to battle its rival, the Independent Cartel of Acapulco (also an offshoot of the Beltrán Leyva Cartel) and to have links with the Sinaloa Cartel.

Former Tabasco state Secretary of Public Security and aide to former governor Adán Augusto López, Hernán Bermúdez Requena is wanted for questioning regarding his ties and involvement with La Barredora. A warrant for arrest was issued the same day that is believed Bermúdez Requena fled Mexico and may be seeking protection in either Panama or Brazil. He is wanted by Interpol.

On 12 September 2025, ring leader Hernán Bermúdez Requena was captured in Paraguay and extradited to Mexico several days later. He is currently being held at Almoloya prison in Almoloya de Juárez.
