= Humberto Hernández Haddad =

Mexican politician

Deputy of the Congress of the Union for Tabasco's 4th district
- In office 1 September 1979 – 31 August 1982
- Succeeded by: Manuel Llergo Heredía

Deputy of the Congress of the Union for the Tabasco's 2nd district
- In office 1 September 1973 – 31 August 1976
- Preceded by: Rubén Dario Vidal Ramos
- Succeeded by: Roberto Madrazo Pintado

Personal details
- Born: Humberto Hernández Haddad; 19 July 1951 (age 75) Villahermosa, Tabasco, Mexico
- Parents: Antonio Hernández Caro; Tirsa Haddad Gallegos
- Education: National Autonomous University of Mexico

Humberto Hernández Haddad (born 19 July 1951) is a Mexican lawyer, former senator and federal congressman, and Mexican Consul General to the United States in San Antonio, Texas.

== Education ==
Hernandez Haddad graduated law school with honors at the National Autonomous University of Mexico (UNAM) in 1972. That same year, he obtained the National "President Benito Juárez" Award for his thesis "A Constitutional Analysis of the Reform Laws".

In 1978, he became a fellow at Harvard University's Weatherhead Center for International Affairs in Cambridge, Massachusetts.

He obtained a master's degree in international public policy (MIPP) from Johns Hopkins University's Paul H. Nitze School of Advanced International Studies (SAIS) in 1981, for his studies in international economics. He completed a course in French civilization at the Sorbonne University in 1981.

== Political career ==
In 1973, at age 21, he was elected to serve his first term as a federal congressman for the 49th Congress for the Institutional Revolutionary Party (PRI) in Tabasco's 2nd district.

He was elected to his second term as federal congressman in 1979, for Tabasco's 4th district, during which he served as Chairman for the Chamber of Deputies' Science and Technology Committee.

From 1982 to 1988 he served as Senator for his home-state of Tabasco, and was appointed Chairman of the Senate Foreign Relations Committee. From 1983 to 1987 he was also Secretary of Foreign Affairs for the PRI National Executive Committee. A 1999 book said he was the youngest national in history to achieve all of his political positions in such short time.

In 1989 he was appointed Consul General of Mexico for South-Central Texas, based in San Antonio. He was elected Chairman of the Consular Corps for South Texas and served from 1991 to 1995.

As a result of his diplomatic performance as Consul General of Mexico in the United States of America he cancelled any membership or affiliation to the Institutional Revolutionary Party (PRI).

President Andrés Manuel López Obrador appointed Humberto Hernández Haddad as Under Secretary of Tourism on 1 December 2018.

== Awards ==
In 2002 he received the National Journalism Award for his editorial publications.
