= Homosexuality in Mexico =

The study of homosexuality in Mexico can be divided into three separate periods, coinciding with the three main periods of Mexican history: pre-Columbian, colonial, and post-independence.

The data on the pre-Columbian people and those of the period of colonization is scarce and obscure as most civilizations did not take into account homosexuals. With exceptions like Nezahualcoyotl leader of Texcoco, Texcoco was the legal and intellectual center of the triple alliance who's laws regarding homosexuals are documented by Ixtlilxochitl. The punishment for homosexuality in Texcoco and the Mexica empire was death, for the penetrated partner it was a very gruesome death, the insides of the partner who had been penetrated were taken out of the body and then the victim was covered in ashes and thrown into flames while the dominant partner was suffocated in ash and also thrown into the flames, it was not ritual it was punishment. Ixtlilxochitl's exact words: "And for the good governance of his kingdom as well as all the empire, he established eighty laws which he deemed fitting for the republic at that time and season... among them, the abominable sin, which was punished with great rigor: the active partner, tied to a stake, was covered by all the boys of the city with ash, such that he was buried within it; and the passive partner had his entrails extracted through his lower parts, and was likewise buried in ash." The Florentine codex defines "Cuiloni" and what happened to them: "The sodomite [is] an effeminate — a defilement, a corruption, filth; a taster of filth, revolting, perverse, full of affliction. [He merits] laughter, ridicule, mockery, [he is] detestable, nauseating. Disgusting, he makes one acutely sick. Womanish, playing the part of a woman, he merits being committed to flames, burned, consumed by fire. He burns; he is consumed by fire. He talks like a woman, he takes the part of a woman." Historians often described the indigenous customs that surprised them or that they disapproved of, but tended to take a position of accusation or apology, which makes it impossible to distinguish between reality and propaganda. In general, it seems that the Mexica were as or more homophobic than the Spanish, while small groups like the Muxe people did accept homosexuality; it was very few cultures who were tolerant of it.

The history of homosexuality in the colonial period and after independence is still in great part yet to be studied. Above all, the 1658 executions of sodomites and the 1901 Dance of the Forty-One, two great scandals in Mexican public life, dominate the scene.

The situation is changing in the 21st century, in part by the discovery of the LGBT community as potential consumers, the so-called pink peso, and tourists. Laws have been created to combat discrimination (2003), and two federal entities, the Federal District and Coahuila, have legalized civil unions for same-sex couples (2007). On 21 December 2009, despite opposition from the Catholic Church, the government of Mexico City approved same-sex marriage, with 39 votes in favor, 20 against and 5 abstaining. It was the first city in Latin America to do so. However, Mexico in 2007 was still one of the countries in which the most crimes were committed against the LGBT community, with the murder of a person in a homophobic crime every two days.

== Pre-Columbian Mexico ==
The majority of information on the pre-Columbian peoples comes from the reports of the Spanish conquest. Those accounts must be taken with caution since the accusation of sodomy was used to justify the conquest, along with other accusations real or invented such as human sacrifice, cannibalism, or idolatry. Given that the defenders of the natives manipulated the information to their opinion as much as those who were opposed by them, some trying to minimize the incidence of sodomy and others exaggerating the stories, it proves impossible to get an adequate picture of homosexuality in pre-Columbian Mexico. The historian Antonio de Herrera arrived at that conclusion as early as 1601.

=== Maya ===
The Maya were relatively tolerant of homosexuality. It is known that there were orgies among the Maya that included homosexual sex though sodomy was punishable by death.

Mayan society considered homosexuality preferable to premarital heterosexual sex and so the nobles got sex slaves for their children.

=== Mexica ===
The Mexica had different worldviews from the Spanish authorities who compiled the sources presently available for study, which makes understanding of pre-colonial Mexica gender and sexuality more difficult to understand since they were recorded through a Spanish filter. Geoffrey Kimball argues that later texts from the early colonial-period like the Florentine Codex have been mistranslated because of the homophobic prejudices that were prevalent in the United States at the time.

Social attitudes towards homosexual men and women were negative and ranged from disgust to amusement because they were perceived as violating Mexica gender roles, but attitudes were less negative on homosexuality for women than men. Homosexual men during the period of the Aztec Empire had methods of publicly identifying each other, which made them highly visible in Mexica society, and according to certain records, homosexual intercourse was performed in Mexica bathhouses.

Nonetheless, executions of male homosexuals are not attested during this period, and the existence of public identification methods by homosexual men makes it unlikely that they would have been persecuted; evidence from Monarquia Indiana by Juan de Torquemada suggests that same-sex sexual relationships between men and between women were not criminalized.

While male and female homosexuality were known and disapproved of in Mexica society, there is no evidence of any suppression of homosexuality among Mexicas, with all homophobic persecutions having been introduced after the Spanish conquest of the Aztec Empire after various forms of homosexuality acknowledged by the pre-colonial Mexica were redefined as "sodomy" and "sin" by Christian friars.

Homosexual men in Mexica society also had a religious role, with records suggesting that there was a connection between them and Titlacahuan, that is the trickster aspect of the god Tezcatlipoca. Titlacahuan himself was depicted carrying a flower signifying his eroticism and blowing on a phallic flute denoting penance and communication with the gods, and was associated with excessive sexual activity.

There were four terms in Classical Nahuatl that referred to homosexuality; they were defined by the sexual activities of their subjects, rather than by psychological characteristics:

1. xōchihuah,
2. cuīlōni,
3. chimouhqui,
4. and patlācheh.

Additionally, the Mexica referred to effeminate men as cihuāyōlloh, meaning "one with a woman's heart," and to intersex people as cihuāoquichtli, meaning "woman-man."

==== xōchihuah ====
The Classical Nahuatl term was used to refer to a group of gender-variant people who wore women's clothing and performed women's tasks. It was composed of the term xōchitl, meaning "flower," and the suffix -huah, meaning "owner of." It thus literally meant "flower-bearer" because of the association of flowers with excess and sexual desire in Mexica culture.

The xōchihuah held an institutionalised, albeit degraded, role within Mexica society whereby they were kept as dependents of high-level nobles for whom they performed household chores, cleaned temples, accompanied warriors in war, provided them with services such as sexual ones.

The verb te-xōchihuia, made by using the prefix te-, denoting a human object of a verbal action, literally meant "to use flowers on someone" and was used metaphorically in the sense "to seduce someone."

==== cuīlōni ====
The term cuīlōni referred to a sub-category of xōchihuah who held the passive role during sexual intercourse. The name was derived from the term *cuīlō, itself the non-active stem of the verb te-cui, meaning "to sexually penetrate someone." Thus, cuīlōni meant "one who is sexually penetrated."

==== chimouhqui ====
The term chimouhqui was derived from a verb *chimohua or *chimohui, of uncertain meaning. The word designated homosexual men.

==== patlācheh ====
The term patlācheh was used to refer to homosexual women, and the verb te-patlāchhuia was used to denote female homosexual intercourse.

=== Other indigenous peoples ===
In spite of the puritanism of the Mexica, the sexual customs of the people conquered by the Aztec Empire varied to a certain extent. For example, the Mixe people from Oaxaca; Bartolomo de las Casas gives the example that the Mixe cruelly set fire to the sodomites discovered in the temple. Friar Gregorio García, writing in 1607, asserted that prior to Spanish contact the indigenous people of New Spain "punished the sodomites with death, executed them with great vigor" and "strangled or drowned the women who lay with other women."

Bernal Díaz del Castillo accused the priestly class (papas) of the Totonac capital Cempoala of practicing sodomy, and made sweeping accusations against the Huastec people of Pánuco as universally sodomitical. Bernal Díaz del Castillo speaks of homosexuality among the ruling classes, prostitution of young people, and cross-dressing. However, Fray Gerónimo de Mendieta, writing of the same Totonac and Huastec priests, described them as 'most chaste and of irreproachable life among their people.' The direct contradiction between these two accounts illustrates the degree to which accusations of sodomy served as a legal and rhetorical justification for conquest rather than reliable ethnographic observation."

== Colonial era ==
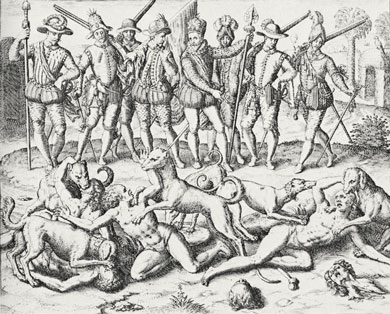
Engraving by Theodor de Bry that represents the scene in which Balboa sets his dogs on some two-spirits (1594); Public library of New York.

In 1511, Peter Martyr d'Anghiera published his De orbe novo decades, with the information that he was able to get about the first explorers from his friendship with Isabella I of Castile. D'Anghiera told how Vasco Núñez de Balboa, during his exploration of Quarequa, in the Isthmus of Panama, in 1513, upset with "a brother of the king and other young men, obliging men, [who] dressed effeminately with women's clothing [... of those which the brother of the king] went too far with unnatural" temerity, threw forty of them as food to the dogs. D'Anghiera continues his story saying that the indigenous people's "natural hate for unnatural sin" drove them so that, "spontaneously and violently, they searched for all the rest that they would know who were infected". After all, D'Anghiera mentions that "only the nobles and the gentlemen practiced that kind of desire. [... The] indigenous people knew that sodomy gravely offended God. [... And that these acts provoked] the tempests that with thunder and lightning so frequently afflicted them, or the floods that drowned their fruits that had caused hunger and sickness."

In an account on the indigenous people realized in 1519 for the council of the town of Veracruz to report to Charles I, attributed to Hernán Cortés, it is mentioned that they had "managed to know for certain that they are all sodomites and practice that abominable sin". In another account from an anonymous Italian conquistador, it is said that the men and women of Pánuco worship a masculine member and have erect phalluses in their temples and public plazas to worship them: "the multitude of methods used by the men to satisfy their abominable vice [is] almost too unbelievable to be sure. [...] the devil contained in their idols has possessed them. It has given them instructions to sacrifice their fellow men, to extract their hearts and to offer the hearts, as well as the blood taken from the tongue, the ears, the legs and the arms, all to the idols". Finally, he comments that "all the inhabitants of New Spain and those of other adjacent provinces ate human flesh, all commonly practiced sodomy and drank to excess" and compared some of the customs of the indigenous people with those of the ungodly Saracens.

In the middle of the 16th century the conquistador Bernal Díaz del Castillo and the soldier Juan de Grijalva write about scenes of sodomy carved into the architecture, in gold jewelry, in terracota and in statues. The West Indies explorer and gold smelting manager Gonzalo Fernández de Oviedo y Valdés included specifics in his 1526 La Natural hystoria de las Indias (his Sumario), expanded in his Historia general y natural de las Indias (1535, further expanded in 1851 from his previously unpublished papers). Around the same time, Núñez Cabeza de Vaca writes:

diabolical practices [...] a man married to another man, amarionados or effeminate, impotent men that dressed like women and performed women's duties, nevertheless, they fired the bow and the arrow and could carry heavy loads on their persons. We saw many amarionados, although taller and sturdier than the other men. Many of these men practiced the sin against nature.

— Núñez Cabeza de Vaca

Isabella of Portugal, wife of Charles V, possibly driven by these accounts, banned in 1529 the planting or use of maguey for the fermentation of pulque. The queen thought that it caused "drunkenness and drove the Indians to carry out" human sacrifices and unspeakable sin.

Those and other accounts were converted into an authentic literary genre, circulated to the whole Peninsula, and were used to justify the idea of Eepire; it was another "just cause" for the domination and occupation of the West Indies. Francisco de Vitoria, despite believing that the indigenous people were right and that as such, the emperor did not have law over them, thought that "the heathens that committed sins against nature, such as idolatry, pederasty or fornication, all those offenses to God, could have been stopped by force". Among those sins against nature was naturally sodomy, the sin against nature par excellence. The legislation was based on the different culture and its customs, among the most notable: cannibalism, human sacrifice, and sodomy, in this case the conquest of the Aztec Empire could have represented simply an extension of the Spanish reconquest of the infidels, represented then by the Moors. Thus the circle was closed with the relationship of Moor, sodomite, Indian.

In reaction to those writings and accusations, as of 1542, Bartolomé de Las Casas, along with other indigenous and missionary writers, launched a literary counteroffensive. Las Casas considered the "beastly vice of sodomy as the worst, the most detestable of any human wickedness". He denied with passion the reports passed on by the conquistadors and explorers, who had "defamed the Indians, having accused them of being infected with sodomy, a great and wicked falsehood" and thought that they observed "abstinence towards the sensual, vile and dirty affections", although he admitted that in a country so big there could be isolated cases of particular people in particular cases, attributed to "a natural corruption, depravity, a kind of innate sickness or fear of witchcraft and other magic spells", but in no case among the converts to Christianity. Las Cases gives for example the mixe who cruelly set fire to the sodomites discovered in the temple. According to the statements of Friar Augustín de Vetancurt, those men who dressed as women (and vice versa) were hanged if they committed unspeakable sin and the priests were burned, a report that Friar Gerónimo de Mendieta confirms. Friar Gregorio García, in his Origin of the Indians of the new world (sic, 1607), assured that before the arrival of the Spanish "the men of New Spain committed huge sins, especially those against nature, although repeatedly they burned for those and were consumed in the fire sent from the heavens [... the indigenous people] punished the sodomites with death, executed them with great vigor. [...] They strangled or drowned the women who lay with other women since those also considered it against nature". Garcia attributed the cases of sodomy to the fact that the "miserable Indians act like that because the Devil has tricked them, making them believe that the gods they worship also practice sodomy and therefore they consider it a good and lawful custom".

Nevertheless, Las Casas could not stop giving news about homosexual acts in contemporary Indian societies, as the custom of the fathers buying young boys for their children "to be used for the pleasure of sodomy", the existence of "infamous public places known as efebías where lewd and shameless young men practiced the abominable sin with all those who came into the house" or the two-spirits, "impotent, effeminate men dressed as women and carrying out their work". Also, Friar Gregoria García gave news of that kind, such as "some men dressed as women and some father had five sons [... the younger] dressed him as a woman, and instructed him in his work and married him as a girl, although even in New Spain they scorned the effeminate and womanly Indians". The mentions of sodomy continued for a long time, even in 1666, in Cristóbal de Agüero and in 1697, in Friar Ángel Serra.

Indigenous writers did not delay in joining Las Casas to defend American culture. Fernando de Alva Cortés Ixtlilxochitl, governor of Texcoco, wrote in 1605 that among the Chichimecs, the one who "assumed the function of the woman had his internal parts extracted by the backside while he stayed tied up to a stake, after which some boys poured ashes on the body until it was buried under them [...] they covered all the pile with many pieces of firewood and set it on fire. [... also] covered that which had functioned as man with ashes while he was alive, until he died". Alva Ixtlilxochitl's account is, according to Crompton, too detailed to be invented, but according to Garza the story shows clear signs of Mediterranean influence in the fact of the differentiation between active and passive homosexuals.

During the Spanish Golden Age, the crime of sodomy was handled and punished in equivalent manner to that of treason or heresy, the two most serious crimes against the State. Initially the Inquisition was controlled by the local bishops, such as the archbishop Juan de Zumárraga (1536-1543), of whom a study of the cases judged shows that homosexuality was one of the main preoccupations of the court. The punishments for sexual sins tended to be fines, penance, public humiliation, and lashing in the most serious cases. In 1569, Felipe II officially creates the tribunal of Mexico City, but in the Viceroyalty of New Spain, only civil law took charge of judging the unspeakable sin.

The first known burning of sodomites in Mexico was in 1530, when they burned on the Caltzontzin pyre for idolatry, sacrifice, and sodomy. Pedro Cieza de León also tells that Juan of Olmos, principal judge of Puerto Viejo, had burned "great quantities of those depraved and demonic Indians". In 1596, the viceroy, Gaspar de Zúñiga, Count of Monterrey, reported in a letter that was sent to Philip II to justify the increase of the salary of the royal officials that those had seized and burned some delinquents for the unspeakable sin and other types of sodomy, although he does not give the number of victims or the circumstances of the event.

In 1658 the Viceroy of New Spain, the Duke of Albuquerque, wrote to Philip IV about a case of unspeakable sin in Mexico City in which he had "nineteen prisoners, fourteen of which [were] sentenced to burn". Lucas Matheo, a young man of 15 years, was saved from the bonfire thanks to his youth, but suffered 200 lashes and six years of forced labor by cannon. Among the documents sent to the king is a letter from the judge of the Supreme Court of His Majesty, Juan Manuel Sotomayor, who describes sodomy as an "endemic cancer" that had "infested and spread among the captive prisoners of the Inquisition in their individual cells and the ecclesiastical officials have also begun their own investigations". The letter from Sotomayor reports that between 1657 and 1658 they have investigated and sentenced 125 individuals, whose names, ethnicities, and occupations he lists next. The viceroy, as much as the magistrate, bases his rejection of sodomy on the Bible and religion, although they use stories sui generis, like Sotomayor, who writes "as some saints have professed, that all the sodomites have died with the birth of Our Lord Jesus".

The previous case allows us to catch a glimpse of the subculture of homosexuals in Mexico City in the first half of the 17th century since many of the accused were more than 60 years old and took that life for more than 20. All those involved came from the lower classes: blacks, indigenous people, mulattos, and deformed Europeans. There are signs that the wealthier classes were also implicated, but were not deemed affected thanks to their influence. Many of the accused had nicknames, like Juan de la Vega, who was called "la Cotita", Juan de Correa, "la Estanpa", or Miguel Gerónimo, "la Cangarriana", the nickname of a prostitute from the city who was known for her promiscuity. The group met periodically in private houses, often on the days of religious festivities with the excuse of praying and giving tribute to the Virgin and the saints, but in reality they had cross-dressing dances and orgies. The next meeting places and dates were mentioned in the previous parties or were disseminated by mail and messengers who belonged to the group.

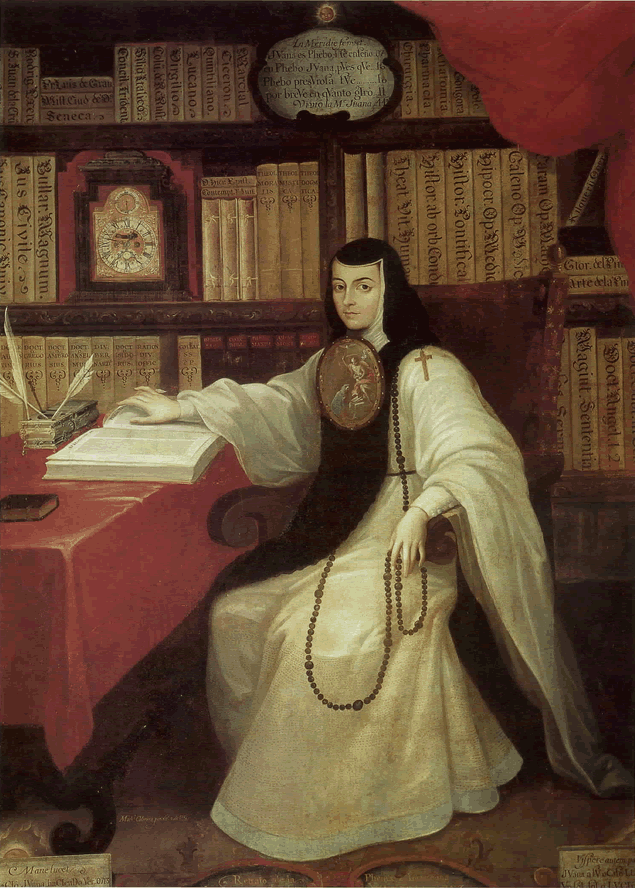
Sor Juana Inés de la Cruz has become an icon for modern lesbian culture.

Colonial culture was similar to that of Spain and had and had prominent intellectuals among those born in America. Perhaps one of the most important was Sor Juana Inés de la Cruz, of whom it has also been said that she was a lesbian, based on the intense friendships that she had with various women, the beauty of whom she praises in her poetry.

== Independent Mexico ==
In 1821 Mexico gained independence from Spain and began a new phase. Some researchers have emphasized that cultural practices, such as friendship and the homosociality of some groups of leaders, and clergy, the army, and lawyers, among others, facilitated the development of homoerotic practices. President Anastasio Bustamante, for example, used to have "young gentlemen" or "favorites" as hostesses, private secretaries, who lived and traveled with him for long periods.

In 1863, French troops took Mexico City and established Maximilian I as Emperor of Mexico. Fernando Bruquetas de Castro, in his book "Kings who loved like queens", states that Maximilian I was gay. It seems that the rumors of his homosexuality began in the court of Brussels, where his wife, the princess Carlota Amalia, came from. The conclusive breakup between Maximilian and Carlota was during a stopover in Madeira, where the future emperor made a famous escape for the homosexual underworld of the island. In Mexico, Carlota became pregnant, possibly by the baron Alfred van Der Smissen, who formed part of the queen's guard, while the emperor was surrounded by his male friends, like the prince Félix Salm-Salm or the colonel López, who were loyal to the end.

The French invasion introduced the Napoleonic Code in Mexico. The code does not mention sodomy, which had ceased to be a crime. Nevertheless, the new Penal Code introduced in 1871 "attack on morality and proper customs", a relatively vague concept whose interpretation was left to the police and the judges, and which was used against homosexuals. Thus, in the late 19th century, a homosexual subculture had already formed in Mexico City, similar to that existing in other large American cities such as Buenos Aires, Rio de Janeiro, Havana, New York City, and Toronto. The work of historians like Victor M . Macías-González, Pablo Picatto, and Robert Buffington, among others, has identified areas such as gay bathhouses, prisons, and some squares and avenues of the capital. The work of criminologist Roumagnac, for example, gives details of homosexual practices in the country's prisons.

In the spring of 1918, Manuel Palafox, secretary general of Emiliano Zapata, was accused by political enemies within the Zapatista camp of having leaked information through his homosexual relationships. Put under the watch of Gildardo Magaña, he escaped and sought to bring together the Zapatista leaders around him, in which he failed. Palafox died in 1959 without revealing his homosexuality.

In the 1930s there already existed some bars and baths for homosexuals in Mexico City in the areas around Alameda, Zócalo, Paseo de Reforma and Calle Madero. In the next decade, during World War II, the city had ten to fifteen bars, and dancing was permitted in El África and El Triumfo. The relative permissivity ended in 1959, when Mayor Uruchurtu closed all the city's gay bars after a triple crime.

=== The Dance of the Forty-One ===
The most famous scandal of the 19th and 20th centuries was known as the Dance of the Forty-One. The incident revolved around a raid executed on 18 November 1901, during Porfirio Díaz's term of office. The raid, executed on Calle de la Paz (since renamed Calle Ezequiel Montes), was against a dance attended by 41 men, of which 22 were dressed as men and 19 as women. The Mexican press fed on the event, despite the Governor's efforts to cover it up, since the participants belonged to the upper echelons of society. The list of the detainees was never published.

On Sunday night, at a house on the fourth block of Calle la Paz, the police burst into a dance attended by 41 unaccompanied men wearing women's clothes. Among those individuals were some of the dandies seen every day on Calle Plateros. They were wearing elegant ladies' dresses, wigs, false breasts, earrings, embroidered slippers, and their faces were painted with highlighted eyes and rosy cheeks. When the news reached the street, all forms of comments were made and the behavior of those individuals was subjected to censure. We refrain from giving our readers further details because they are exceedingly disgusting.

— Contemporary press report.

A rumor, neither confirmed nor denied, soon emerged, claiming that there were in reality 42 participants, with the 42nd being Ignacio de la Torre, Porfirio Díaz's son-in-law, who was allowed to escape. Although the raid was illegal and completely arbitrary, the 41 were convicted and conscripted into the army and sent to Yucatán where the Caste War was still being fought:

The derelicts, petty thieves, and crossdressers sent to Yucatán are not in the battalions of the Army fighting against the Maya Indians, but have been assigned to public works in the towns retaken from the common enemy of civilization.

— El Popular, 25 November 1901

On 4 December 1901, there was a similar raid on a group of lesbians in Santa María, but the incident received far less attention.

As a result of the scandal, the numbers 41 and 42 were adopted by Mexican popular parlance to refer to homosexuality, with 42 reserved for passive homosexuals. The incident and the numbers were spread through press reports but also engravings, satires, plays, literature, and paintings; in recent years, they have even appeared on television, in the historical telenovela El vuelo del águila, first broadcast by Televisa in 1994. In 1906 Eduardo A. Castrejón published a book titled Los cuarenta y uno. Novela crítico-social. José Guadalupe Posada's engravings alluding to the affair are famous, and were frequently published alongside satirical verses:

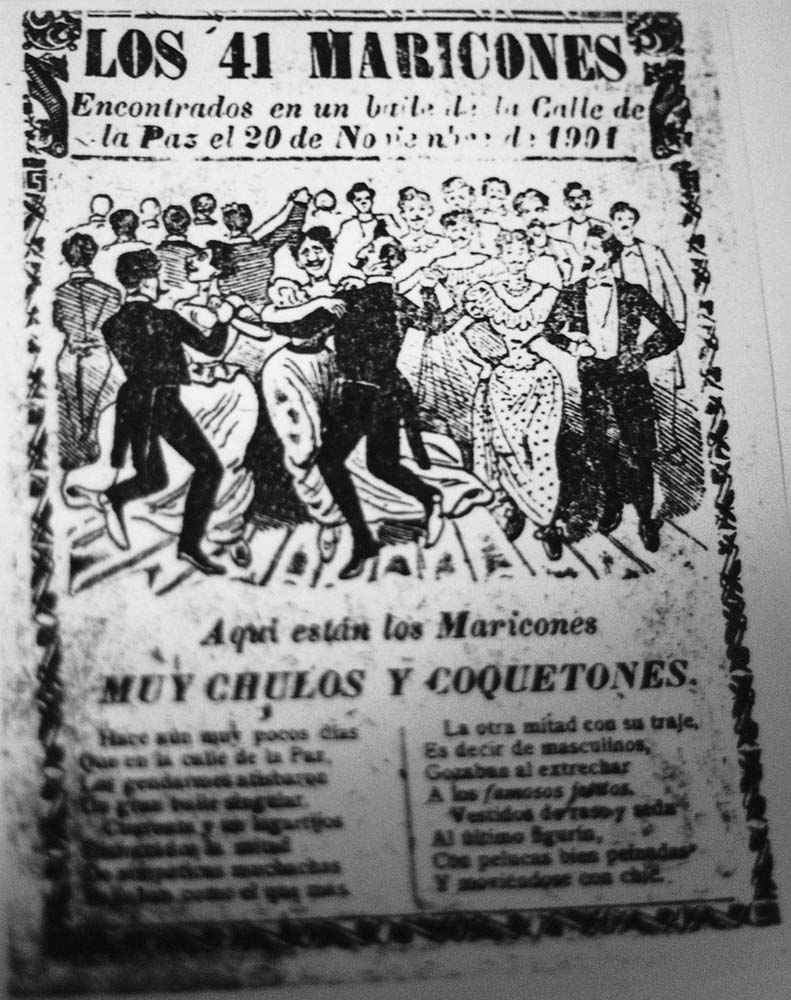
Newspaper published in 1901 following the Dance of the 41

Hace aún muy pocos días
Que en la calle de la Paz,
Los gendarmes atisbaron
Un gran baile singular.
Cuarenta y un lagartijos
Disfrazados la mitad
De simpáticas muchachas
Bailaban como el que más.
La otra mitad con su traje,
Es decir de masculinos,
Gozaban al estrechar
A los famosos jotitos.
Vestidos de raso y seda
Al último figurín,
Con pelucas bien peinadas
Y moviéndose con chic.

— Anónimo

Such was the impact of the affair that the number 41 became taboo, as described by the essayist Francisco L. Urquizo:

In Mexico, the number 41 has no validity and is offensive... The influence of this tradition is so strong that even officialdom ignores the number 41. No division, regiment, or battalion of the army is given the number 41. From 40 they progress directly to 42. No payroll has a number 41. Municipal records show no houses with the number 41; if this cannot be avoided, 40 bis is used. No hotel or hospital has a room 41. Nobody celebrates their 41st birthday, going straight from 40 to 42. No vehicle is assigned a number plate with 41, and no police officer will accept a badge with that number.

— Francisco L. Urquizo

The precedent from the Dance of the Forty-One has been used since that time to continue constant raids, police blackmail, torture, beatings, shipments to jail and to the prison of the Maria Islands, with a simple mention that it concerned an "attack on morality and proper customs".

=== Society in 20th century ===
Many homosexuals continued living in the family house, since their activities tended to be private or clandestine. In the late 20th century and the early 21st century, homosexuals continue to be discreet about their sexual orientation, many being in the closet and others living an open secret.

The lower classes of Mexican society tend to preserve the Mediterranean model, in which homosexuals are divided into active and passive, the active ones being "masculine" and the passive ones being "effeminate" and "contemptible": "I'm a man; if I fuck you, you're not a man". There exists fear among active homosexuals of being penetrated, because they fear the possibility that they will like it and cease to be "men". For their part, the homosexuals of the higher, more cosmopolitan classes took the European model of the dandy in the late 19th century. This model is being replaced by another more similar to the Anglo-Saxon one, in which the homosexual is not defined by the active/passive dichotomy, but by the fact that he has sexual relations with other men. Those who refuse to define themselves as active or passive are called "internationals".

Among many Mexican homosexuals there exists the so-called "phallic dream", which consists of seeing the US as a sexual utopia, in which they can be free and openly gay. Acting accordingly, they try to make contact with foreign tourists as a springboard to the dream destination. However, as of 2007, many have become disillusioned in the dream destination when faced with prevailing homophobia and racism.

=== LGBT movement ===
Until the late 1960s, there were neither LGBT groups nor publications on the topic. The first LGBT groups were formed in the early 1970s in Mexico City and Guadalajara. On 15 August 1971, the Homosexual Liberation Front was formed, the first of its kind in Mexico. It was dissolved a year later.

One of the first LGBT activists was Nancy Cárdenas, a writer, actress, and theater director who was inspired by the LGBT movements in Europe and the United States began to direct gatherings of LGBT writers. In 1973, she was the first Mexican to openly discuss her homosexuality on Mexican television. In 1974, she founded the Homosexual Liberation Front (FLH), the first LGBT organisation of Mexico.

On 26 July 1978, the first LGBT march took place, in favour of the Cuban Revolution. The march was organised by the Homosexual Front for Revolutionary Action (FHAR). On 2 October, the groups FLH, Lesbos, Oikabeth, Lambda of Homosexual Liberation, and Sex-Pol, among others, marched in the demonstration to commemorate the tenth anniversary of the movement of 1968. In 1979, FHAR took to the streets again in favor of the Nicaraguan Revolution. As can be appreciated, the LGBT movement was very connected to leftist movements in the beginning. In late June 1979, the first demonstration in favor of homosexual rights took place, coinciding with the anniversary of the Stonewall riots. Demonstrators demanded freedom of sexual expression, and protested social and police repression. Since then, an LGBT march is celebrated annually on 28 June, but those groups and others have not had the necessary continuity.

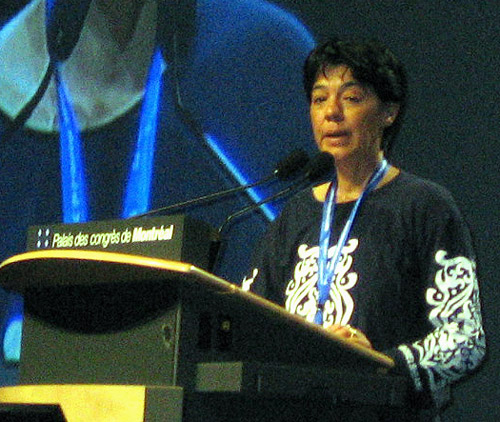
Patria Jiménez, on 28 July 2006 in Montreal

The LGBT movement found itself paradoxically driven by the AIDS crisis, which is believed to have reached Mexico in 1981. LGBT groups were focused more on the fight against the infection, carrying out prevention and safe sex campaigns with information on the disease, but also led their fight against the social prejudices of the more conservative sectors, which considered AIDS a divine punishment. The demonstrations, which had become annual, asked for the end of social discrimination against AIDS patients, especially in employment, hospitals and health centers, and prevention measures, such as the promotion of condom use.

In the 1990s, without ceasing to fight for the aforementioned issues, activists began to protest the murders of homosexuals and to defend respect for sexual diversity. In 1992, Patria Jiménez and Gloria Careaga Pérez created the lesbian organization "El clóset de Sor Juana" (Sister Juana's closet), one of the country's most important LGBT organizations. It was accredited as an NGO by the United Nations for the Fourth World Conference on Women.

==== Activists in politics ====
In 1997, Patria Jiménez was the first openly gay person to win a position in Congress, doing so for the Party of the Democratic Revolution. In 2007, Amaranta Gómez Regalado (for México Posible) was the first transgender person to appear in Congress. Amaranta Gómez is identified with the muxe, a name given locally to the two-spirits of Juchitán de Zaragoza (Oaxaca).

== Present ==
=== Homophobia ===
Homophobia is very widespread in Mexican society. Between 2002 and 2007, 1000 people have been murdered in homophobic crimes, as the Chamber of Deputies revealed in May 2007, making Mexico the country with the second-highest rate of homophobic crimes in the world (after Brazil). In a journalistic study by Fernando del Collado, Homofobia, odio, crimen y justicia (Homophobia, hate, crime and justice), there were discussed 400 dead between 1995 and 2005, that is to say, some 3 murders a month, but the City Commission Against Homophobic Hate Crimes calculates that only one in four crimes is reported. From January to August 2009, 40 gay people were murdered in Michoacán alone, nearly all of them in the Tierra Caliente area. The great majority are against gay men; from 1995 to 2004, "only" 16 women had been murdered. The crimes are often ignored or investigated with little interest by the police forces, which give impunity to the criminal in 98% of cases. Other forms of less serious violence are classified into the following types, according to a 2007 study by the Metropolitan Autonomous University (UAM) Xochimilco campus: verbal violence in 32% of cases, sexual harassment in 18%, harassment in 12%, following or pursuit in 12%, and threats in 11%. According to the UAM study, the most frequent types of discrimination "were not hiring for a job, 13 percent; threats of extortion and detention by police, 11 percent; and abuse of employees, 10 percent".

In January 2006, police in Mexico City arrested Raúl Osiel Marroquín, a former Army officer who kidnapped and tortured six men, murdering four of them. Marroquín's case led to debate around the issue of homophobia, including the treatment that media gave to the case.

Some 71% of Mexican youth would not approve if the same rights were given to homosexuals as heterosexuals. A 2006 survey states that 33% of Mexicans feel aversion for homosexuals, some 40% dislike politicians who emphasize homosexuality, and some 32% dislike homosexual neighbors. Homophobia is also deeply rooted in the family. In 2004, only 4 families of those murdered in homophobic crimes, of a total of 26, offered to give information on the matter to a commission that was investigation. In Mexico City, in 2004, of 125 corpses of homosexuals, only 75 were claimed by their relatives; for 13 others, the family came only to the identification; the family of the rest did not approach the funeral home despite having been informed. There are signs that Mexican youth are being committed to psychiatric clinics after coming out to family. Some 16% have been rejected by family, and a greater percentage have been physically attacked by relatives.

Popular culture encourages this attitude. The rock group Molotov published the song "Puto" on its 1997 album ¿Dónde Jugarán las Niñas?. The lyrics of the song contain phrases like "Marica nena mas bien putín, Puto nace, puto se muere, Amo a matón / matarile al maricón / ¿¡y que quiere este hijo de puta!? / quiere llorar, Puto, le faltan tanates al / ¡puto! / le falta topiates / ¡puto! / le faltan tanates al puto puto". The producer, Gustavo Santaolalla, in some statements to the magazine Retila, stated that the word "puto" had not been used in the sense of "gay" but in the sense of "coward" or "loser", which is also used in Mexico.

The Catholic Church has also contributed to a negative view of homosexuals. In 2010, Jose Guadalupe Martin, Bishop of León, Guanajuato and president of the Mexican bishops' conference from 2004 to 2006, five days after the earthquake in Chile, suggested that homosexuals (along with drug violence) are guilty of natural disasters, incurring the wrath of God for gay marriage.

The consequences for the LGBT community are shown in the UAM study, which states that 27% of LGBT persons studied suffer mental disorders and risk of alcoholism, some 40% have thoughts of suicide and 25% have attempted it.

=== LGBT rights ===
The LGBT community has been gaining some rights in the first years of the 21st century. On 29 April 2003, the Federal Law to Prevent and Eliminate Discrimination was passed. The law, which has been criticized as insufficient, gives rise to the creation of the National Council to Prevent Discrimination (Consejo Nacional para Prevenir la Discriminación, CONAPRED), which is in charge of receiving and settling cases of discrimination, as well as "develop[ing] actions to protect all citizens from every distinction or exclusion based on ethnic or national origin, sex, age, disability, social or economic condition, conditions of health, pregnancy, language, religion, beliefs, sexual preferences, marital status or any other, that prevents or annuls the acknowledgement or the exercise of the rights and the real equality of opportunities of persons".

In November 2006, the Law for Coexistence Partnerships was enacted in the Federal District. Called "gay law" in the mass media, this legal arrangement is not orientated exclusively to the homosexual population. The law, in effect since its publication in the official newspaper of the capital city's government on 16 March 2007 gives almost the same rights as a married couple within the limits of the Federal District, with the exception of adoption. The first Mexican state to legalize civil unions was Coahuila on 11 January 2007, under the name of "civil solidarity agreement". The Coahuilan Congress modified the civil code to introduce the new form of cohabitation. The law allows similar rights to marriage, but prohibits adoption by same-sex couples. On 4 March 2010, Mexico City's law allowing same-sex marriage took effect despite an appeal by the Attorney-General of the Republic, which made Mexico the first Latin American country to allow same-sex marriage by non-judicial means. On 12 March 2010, Mexico City held its first same-sex wedding, which was recognized throughout the Mexican territory.

In spite of these advances, in 2006, the Mexican population was primarily against same-sex marriage. In a survey by Parametría, 61% of those surveyed responded "no" when asked if they supported an amendment to the constitution to legalize gay marriage. Only some 17% responded affirmatively and some 14% did not give an opinion. In the same survey, some 41% were against the possibility of giving the same rights enjoyed by a married couple to a registered same-sex couple, only 28% supporting this possibility.

=== The pink peso ===
The pink market (called "LGBT market" or "mercado rosa") in Mexico is calculated at 51,300 million pesos ($4,663 million). The group of LGBT consumers, ignored until the present out of homophobia or fear of critics, is being discovered. In 2005, the Gay Expo in Mexico was created, which claimed to give to know the companies and services to the LGBT community, and the companies of the division have been united into the Union of Companies and Service Providers to the Lesbian, Gay, Bisexual and Transgender Community (Unegay).

A study by the agency De la Riva on the behavior of the LGBT consumer shows that the habits of gay men and lesbians are distinct. While gay men prefer brand names and a riskier lifestyle, lesbians tend to be educated and tend not to pay attention to brand names. Gays respond to advertisements that make knowing winks to the community, but reject advertisements with openly gay themes because they fear being identified through the product. Gay men as much as lesbians have great emotional needs and need to be accepted, and prefer stable partners.

Pink tourism, especially from the U.S., has one of its favorite destinations in Mexico and specially Puerto Vallarta, where it is even possible to see men taking a walk hand in hand in the Zona Romántica. Another favorite destination is Cancun, which has tried to attract the LGBT public with events like the Cancún Mayan Riviera Gay Fall Fiesta and the Cancún International Gay Festival. LGBT tourism does not focus only on sun and beaches and Mayan ruins but is diversifying. For that public are two specialised travel agencies, Opta Tours (since 1991) and Babylon Tours.

=== LGBT culture ===
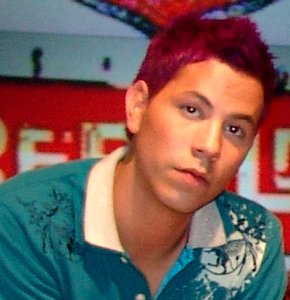
Christian Chávez at a press conference in 2006

Frida Kahlo, one of Mexico's greatest artists, was bisexual. However, her lesbian relationships were of little importance and were diminished by the love of her life, Diego Rivera. Her importance for the LGBT community is not so much for her bisexuality as to her having been converted into a gay icon because of her fighter and non-conformist nature. Other LGBT painters and visual artists are Roberto Montenegro, Nahum B. Zenil, Julio Galán, Roberto Márquez, and Carla Rippey.

Mexican LGBT author Luis Zapata Quiroz has been criticized for perpetuating the stereotypes of the American pattern of the tragic gay man, although he never portrays homosexuality negatively. Carlos Monsiváis also has considered in his critique the profound homoeroticism of the poets belonging to the group Los Contemporáneos between the late 1920s and mid 1940s. Several of his poets, such as Xavier Villaurrutia, Carlos Pellicer, and Salvador Novo, were gay and "let themselves be touched, discreetly, by a theme very dear to the age: the sailors, in the aura of the night port, with their liberty and their beauty". The Chicano LGBT community has also created a thriving culture. Thus, Gloria E. Anzaldúa and Cherríe Moraga are two important authors within the North American LGBT community, and Francisco X. Alarcón, professor at the University of California, has published nine books of poetry.

Within music, there is notably Chavela Vargas (born in Costa Rica and living in Mexico for decades), whose lyrics contain clear lesbian elements, and Juan Gabriel, one of the most important composers of popular music in Mexico. One of the few singers who has come out of the closet has been Christian Chávez, singer for the group RBD. The singer and actor found himself driven to coming out after photos of his wedding in Canada started circulating on the Internet in 2005.

One of the gay centers of culture and amusement in Mexico is the Zona Rosa, a series of streets in Colonia Juárez in Mexico City. Since mid-2007, the government of the Federal District and Cuauhtémoc, D.F., in whose territory the Zona Rosa is found, have placed operatives in some seedy nightclubs of the Zona Rosa, with the purpose of freeing the tourist zone of problems such as illegal drug trade and prostitution, as well as reducing the incidence of crimes such as theft. Other targets of the program are sites of cohabitation that lack safety measures for the users, mainly emergency exits. LGBT groups have denounced the action as a form of homophobia.

==== Film ====
Homosexuality in Mexican film appears depicted in two manners. On one hand, from the 1970s to 1990s, the period after the so-called golden age of film in the country, numerous films incorporated characters with homosexual orientations. It was almost always about male characters who tended to reproduce the stereotypes of popular culture about homosexuals: effeminate men with eccentric clothing and rather eccentric ways of speaking. Homosexuals appear often as secondary characters, almost always executing secondary roles and the butt of jokes on the part of the rest of the characters. An example is the film Fin de la fiesta (1972), in which Doña Beatriz, the mother (played by Sara García), kills her gay son with sticks.

One of the first Mexican films in which the main character is gay was El lugar sin límites (1977), directed by Arturo Ripstein and based on the novel by Chilean José Donoso. The plot revolves around a countrified brothel on the seashore where La Manuela (a transvestite played by Roberto Cobo) and his daughter La Japonesita (Ana Martín) practice prostitution.

Homosexuality appears very differently in the work of the director Jaime Humberto Hermosillo. His films were not widely distributed or were never displayed in public; perhaps the best known is the gay-themed Doña Herlinda y su hijo (1984).

Films like Danzón (1991), by María Novaro; Miroslava (1993), by Alejandro Pelayo; El callejón de los milagros (1995), by Jorge Fons; or Y tu mamá también, by Alfonso Cuarón incorporate homoerotic subject matter as a secondary matter in their plots or in a hidden way. The 2003 film A Thousand Clouds of Peace, directed by Julián Hernández, received the Teddy Award at the Berlin International Film Festival. None of the film's characters approached the homosexual stereotypes that appeared in Mexican film for decades. In 2006, the same director shot another film with gay characters, Broken Sky, which chronicles the tensions in a young couple because of infidelity.

== Sources ==
- Bliss, Katherine Elaine. "The Sexual Revolution in Mexican Studies: New Perspectives on Gender, Sexuality, and Culture in Modern Mexico." Latin American Research Review vol. 35 no. 1, pp. 247–268.
- Carrier, James. De los Otros: Intimacy and Homosexuality among Mexican Men. New York: Columbia University Press 1995.
- Garza, James Alex (2007). The Imagined Underworld: Sex, Crime, and Vice in Porfirian Mexico City. Lincoln, NE: University of Nebraska Press.
- Gutmann, Matthew C. The Meanings of Macho: Being a Man in Mexico City. Berkeley and Los Angeles: University of California Press 1996.
- Kimball, Geoffrey (1993). "Aztec Homosexuality: The Textual Evidence". Journal of Homosexuality. 26 (1): 7–24. doi:10.1300/J082v26n01_02. PMID 8113605.
- Nesvig, Martin (2000). "The Lure of the Perverse: Moral Negotiation of Pederasty in Porfirian Mexico". Mexican Studies/Estudios Mexicanos. 16 (1): 1–37. doi:10.2307/1052120. JSTOR 1052120.
- Piccato, Pablo (2001). City of Suspects: Crime in Mexico City, 1900–1931. Durham, NC: Duke University Press.
- Prieur, Annick. Mema's House, Mexico City: On Machos, Queens, and Transvestites. Chicago: University of Chicago Press 1998.
- Quinones, Sam. "The Jotos of La Fogata" chapter 4 in True Tales of Another Mexico. Albuquerque: University of New Mexico Press 2001.
- Sigal, Pete (2007). "Queer Nahuatl: Sahagún's Faggots and Sodomites, Lesbians and Hermaphrodites". Ethnohistory. 54 (1): 9–34. doi:10.1215/00141801-2006-038.
- Sigal, Pete. The Flower and the Scorpion: Sexuality and Ritual in Early Nahua Culture. Durham: Duke University Press 2011.
