= 4th federal electoral district of Tabasco =

Federal electoral district of Mexico

Tabasco's 4th
- Electoral district of the Chamber of Deputies of Mexico

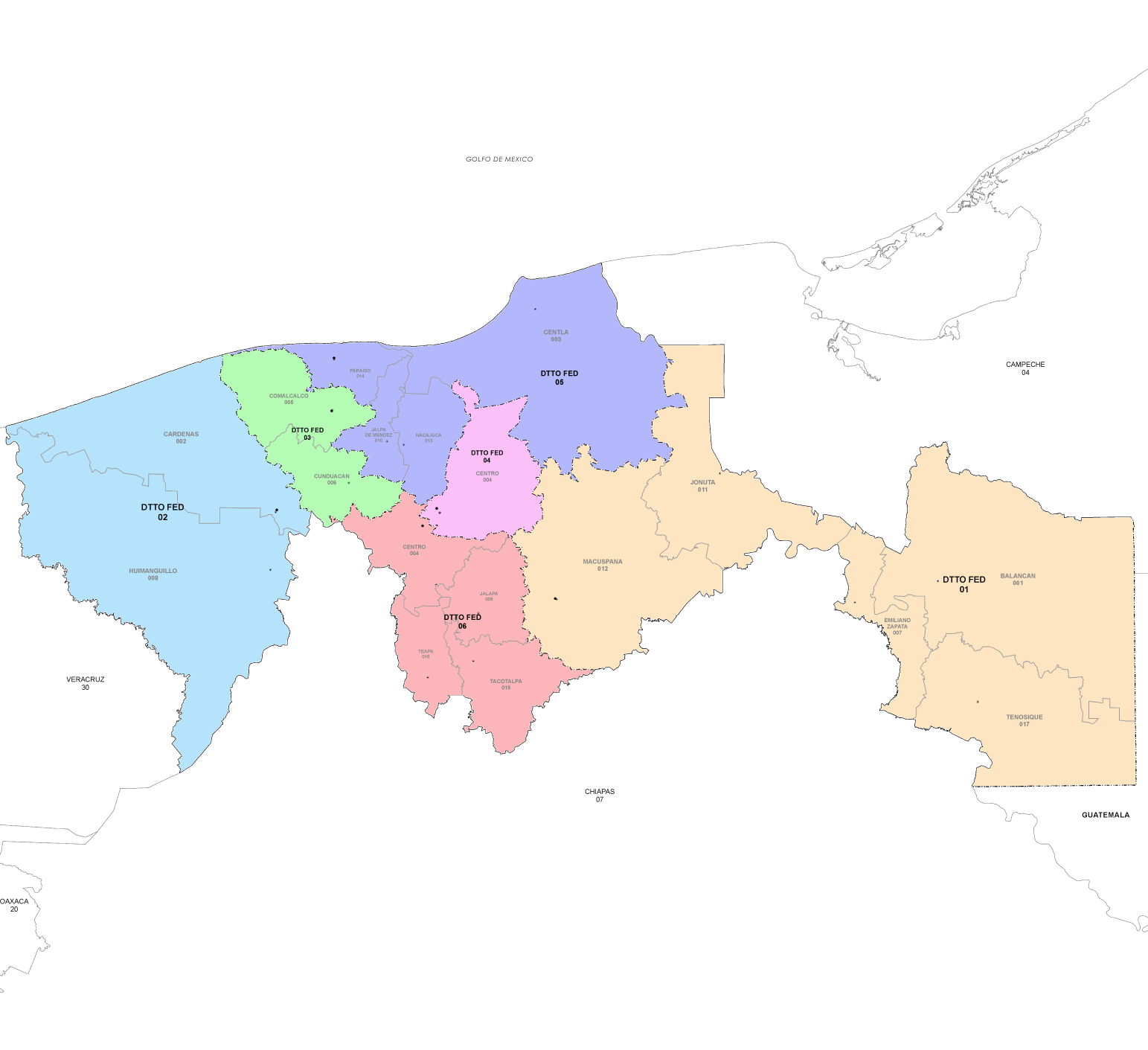
- 4th district

Incumbent
- Member: Jaime Humberto Lastra
- Party: ▌Morena
- Congress: 66th (2024–2027)

District
- State: Tabasco
- Head town: Villahermosa
- Coordinates: 17°59′N 92°56′W
- Covers: Centro (part)
- PR region: Third
- Precincts: 221
- Population: 410,578 (2020 census)

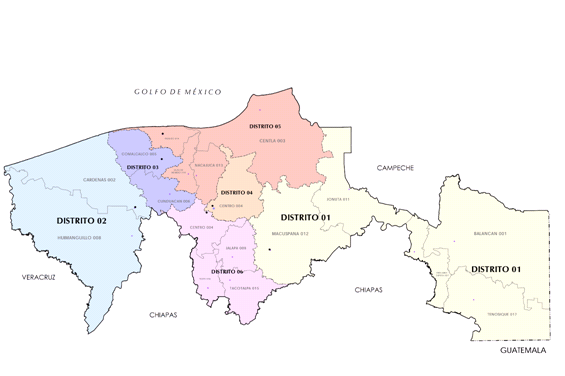
Tabasco's districts in 2017–2022

The 4th federal electoral district of Tabasco (Spanish: Distrito electoral federal 04 de Tabasco) is one of the 300 electoral districts into which Mexico is divided for elections to the federal Chamber of Deputies and one of six such districts in the state of Tabasco.

It elects one deputy to the lower house of Congress for each three-year legislative session by means of the first-past-the-post system. Votes cast in the district also count towards the calculation of proportional representation ("plurinominal") deputies elected from the third region.

Suspended in 1930, (Note: An amendment to Article 52 of the Constitution in 1928 changed the original provision of "one deputy per 60,000 inhabitants" to "one deputy per 100,000"; as a result, the size of the Chamber of Deputies fell from 281 in the 1928 election to 171 in 1934.) Tabasco's 4th was re-established as part of the 1977 political reforms. The restored district returned its first deputy in the 1979 mid-term election.

The current member for the district, elected in the 2024 general election, is Jaime Humberto Lastra Bastar of the National Regeneration Movement (Morena).

== District territory ==
Under the 2023 districting plan adopted by the National Electoral Institute (INE), which is to be used for the 2024, 2027 and 2030 federal elections, Tabasco's 4th district is in the centre of the state and covers 221 electoral precincts (secciones electorales) in the north-eastern part of the municipality of Centro.

The head town (cabecera distrital), where results from individual polling stations are gathered together and tallied, is the state capital, the city of Villahermosa. The district reported a population of 410,578 in the 2020 census.

== Previous districting schemes ==
Evolution of electoral district numbers
	1974	1978	1996	2005	2017	2023
Tabasco	3	5	6	6	6	6
Chamber of Deputies	196	300				

2017–2022

From 2017 to 2022, the district's head town was at Villahermosa and it covered 207 precincts in the north-east of Centro municipality.

2005–2017

Under the 2005 plan, the district's head town was at Villahermosa and it comprised 178 of the municipality's north-eastern precincts.

1996–2005

Tabasco gained its 6th district in the 1996 redistricting process. The 4th covered the northern portion of Centro and the municipality of Nacajuca in its entirety. The state capital served as the head town.

1978–1996

The districting scheme in force from 1978 to 1996 was the result of the 1977 electoral reforms, which increased the number of single-member seats in the Chamber of Deputies from 196 to 300. Under that plan, Tabasco's seat allocation rose from three to five. The new 4th district's head town was at Comalcalco and it comprised the municipalities of Comalcalco, Cunduacán and Paraíso.

== Deputies returned to Congress ==
(Mexico) National parties
- Current
- PAN
- PRI
- PT
- PVEM
- MC
- Morena
- PAZ
- Somos
- Defunct or local only
- PLM
- PNR
- PRM
- PNM
- PP
- PPS
- PARM
- PFCRN
- CON
- PANAL
- PSD
- PES
- PES
- PRD

Tabasco's 4th district
Election	Deputy	Party	Term	Legislature
The 4th district was suspended between 1930 and 1979
1979	Humberto Hernández Haddad	Institutional Revolutionary Party	1979–1982	51st Congress
1982	Manuel Llergo Heredia	Institutional Revolutionary Party	1982–1985	52nd Congress
1985	José Eduardo Beltrán Hernández	Institutional Revolutionary Party	1985–1988	53rd Congress
1988	Víctor León Ramos Zoila	Institutional Revolutionary Party	1988–1991	54th Congress
1991	Jesús Madrazo Martínez de Escobar	Institutional Revolutionary Party	1991–1994	55th Congress
1994	Francisco Peralta Burelo	Institutional Revolutionary Party	1994–1997	56th Congress
1997	Francisco Alberto Rabelo Cupido	Institutional Revolutionary Party	1997–2000	57th Congress
2000	Rosalinda López Hernández	Party of the Democratic Revolution	2000–2003	58th Congress
2003	Eugenio Mier y Concha Campos	Institutional Revolutionary Party	2003–2006	59th Congress
2006	Fernando Enrique Mayans Canabal	Party of the Democratic Revolution	2006–2009	60th Congress
2009	Adán Augusto López Hernández	Party of the Democratic Revolution	2009–2012	61st Congress
2012	Gerardo Gaudiano Rovirosa	Party of the Democratic Revolution	2012–2015	62nd Congress
2015	Liliana Ivette Madrigal Méndez	Institutional Revolutionary Party	2015–2018	63rd Congress
2018	Manuel Rodríguez González	National Regeneration Movement	2018–2021	64th Congress
2021	Manuel Rodríguez González	National Regeneration Movement	2021–2024	65th Congress
2024	Jaime Humberto Lastra Bastar	National Regeneration Movement	2024–2027	66th Congress

=== Results ===
The corresponding page on the Spanish-language Wikipedia contains results of the congressional elections since 2006.

== Presidential elections ==
Tabasco's 4th district
Election	District won by	Party or coalition	%
2018	Andrés Manuel López Obrador	Juntos Haremos Historia	86.8163
2024	Claudia Sheinbaum Pardo	Sigamos Haciendo Historia	79.0209
