= Policia Federal =

Policia Federal may refer to:

== Argentina ==
- Argentine Federal Police

== Brazil ==
- Federal Police (Brazil)
- Brazilian Federal Highway Police
- Brazilian Federal Railroad Police

== Mexico ==
- Federal Police (Mexico)
- Federal Judicial Police, until 2002

== See also ==
- Federales, slang for Mexican Federal Police
- Federal Police
