= Independent Cartel of Acapulco =

Drug cartel from Mexico

Cártel Independiente de Acapulco
- Founded: 2010
- Founding location: Acapulco, Guerrero
- Years active: 2010–2014
- Territory: Guerrero
- Ethnicity: Mexican
- Criminal activities: Drug trafficking, money laundering, extortion, murder, kidnapping, torture and arms trafficking
- Allies: Beltrán-Leyva Cartel; Milenio Cartel
- Rivals: La Barredora; Sinaloa Cartel

The Independent Cartel of Guerrero (Spanish: Cártel Independiente de Acapulco or CIDA) was a criminal gang based in the Mexican resort city of Acapulco, Guerrero and its surrounding territories. The criminal group came into existence during the rapid decentralization of Mexico's drug trafficking organizations as a split-off group of the Beltrán-Leyva Cartel. Originally, the Beltrán Leyva cartel operated in the city, but the group no longer has presence in Acapulco. After the Mexican military gunned down the top boss of the cartel – Arturo Beltrán Leyva – in December 2009, his brother Héctor Beltrán Leyva took control of one of the factions of the cartel and declared war on Edgar Valdez Villarreal, who had long been the right hand of Arturo. Amidst the violence, Valdez Villarreal tried to appoint a successor, but those in Acapulco broke off and formed their own criminal gang: the Independent Cartel of Acapulco. Within weeks, however, the group had splintered also, forming a new and rival group known as La Barredora. Villarreal Valdez was then captured by the Mexican Federal Police in August 2010, but the violence between the groups for the control of Acapulco continued.

The hitmen of the Independent Cartel of Acapulco are known for flaying the faces of their victims and putting them on car seats throughout various points of the city. They are also notorious for extorting taxi drivers and threatening them to avoid taking people to territories of their rivals in risks of getting killed. Part of the reason why the area in Acapulco is often entrenched in violence is because the port city is treasured by drug traffickers due to its corruption, its long and jagged coastline, and the high amount of boat traffic. Hence, Acapulco is considered an ideal place to carry out drug trafficking operations, where smugglers use speedboats to move large sums of cocaine from South America northward.

Since the capture of one of their top leaders in December 2011, the Independent Cartel of Acapulco appears to have been damaged severely and has faded from public view. Their weakness, however, appears to have allowed La Barredora, a Sinaloa Cartel-affiliated gang, to take up the drug operations.

After the assassination of the YouTuber Pamika Montenegro Real (known as "Nana Pelucas") in February 2018, the Prosecutor Xavier Olea Peláez said during a press conference that the ambush was organized by Javier Daniel Cervantes Magno (aka "El Barbas"), member to the cartel of Acapulco led by José Ángel Palacios Galeana (aka "El Capuchino").

== Emergence and structure ==
The emergence of the Independent Cartel of Acapulco illustrates how Felipe Calderón's security policy of going after the top drug lords in the cartels have fragmented them into smaller, localized, and autonomous factions, similar to the criminal groups currently operating in Colombia. The strategy of pursuing the top bosses of the drug trafficking organizations – known as the "Kingpin strategy" – first happened in Colombia in the 1980s. The effectiveness and results of the strategy in Colombia have raised optimism that the same strategy can work in Mexico. Nonetheless, attacking the logistics of the major organized crime groups (that is, arresting their leaders, killing high-ranking lieutenants, and interrupting their drug shipments) has often led to the creation of smaller, more agile gangs like the Independent Cartel of Acapulco. In recent years, the Acapulco area has experienced one of the highest levels of violence in Mexico, as two gangs battle for the control of the lucrative port with the external support of much larger cartels operating at a national level.

The cartel is mostly composed of former members loyal to Edgar Valdez Villarreal, who was arrested in September 2010. The group is responsible for several homicides in Acapulco, and is part of the "wave of smaller local gangs" operating in the area.
