= Carlos Manuel Merino Campos =

Mexican politician (born 1963)

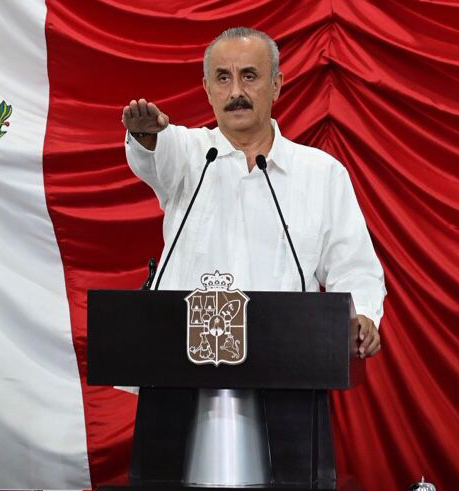

Governor of Tabasco
- Interim
- In office 28 August 2021 – 30 September 2024
- Preceded by: Adán Augusto López
- Succeeded by: Javier May Rodríguez

Secretary of Interior of Tabasco
- In office 26 August 2021 – 26 August 2021
- Preceded by: José Antonio de la Vega Asmitia
- Succeeded by: Guillermo Arturo del Rivero León

Delegate of Development Programs in Tabasco
- In office 1 December 2018 – 26 August 2021
- Succeeded by: Daniel Arturo Cassasús Ruz

Senator from Tabasco
- In office 13 October 2015 – 31 August 2018
- Preceded by: Adán Augusto López
- Succeeded by: Mónica Fernández Balboa

Deputy of the Congress from Tabasco
- In office 1 September 2007 – 31 December 2009
- Preceded by: Adán Augusto López

Personal details
- Born: 11 August 1963 (age 62) Villahermosa, Tabasco
- Party: National Regeneration Movement (2018–present); Labor Party (2015–2018); Party of the Democratic Revolution (2001–2015)
- Occupation: Politician

Carlos Manuel Merino Campos (born 11 August 1963) is a Mexican politician affiliated with the National Regeneration Movement party and was the interim Governor of Tabasco from 2021 to 2024 after Adán Augusto López Hernández left the position. He previously served as a deputy and senator for Tabasco.
