= Adán Augusto López =

Mexican politician (born 1963)

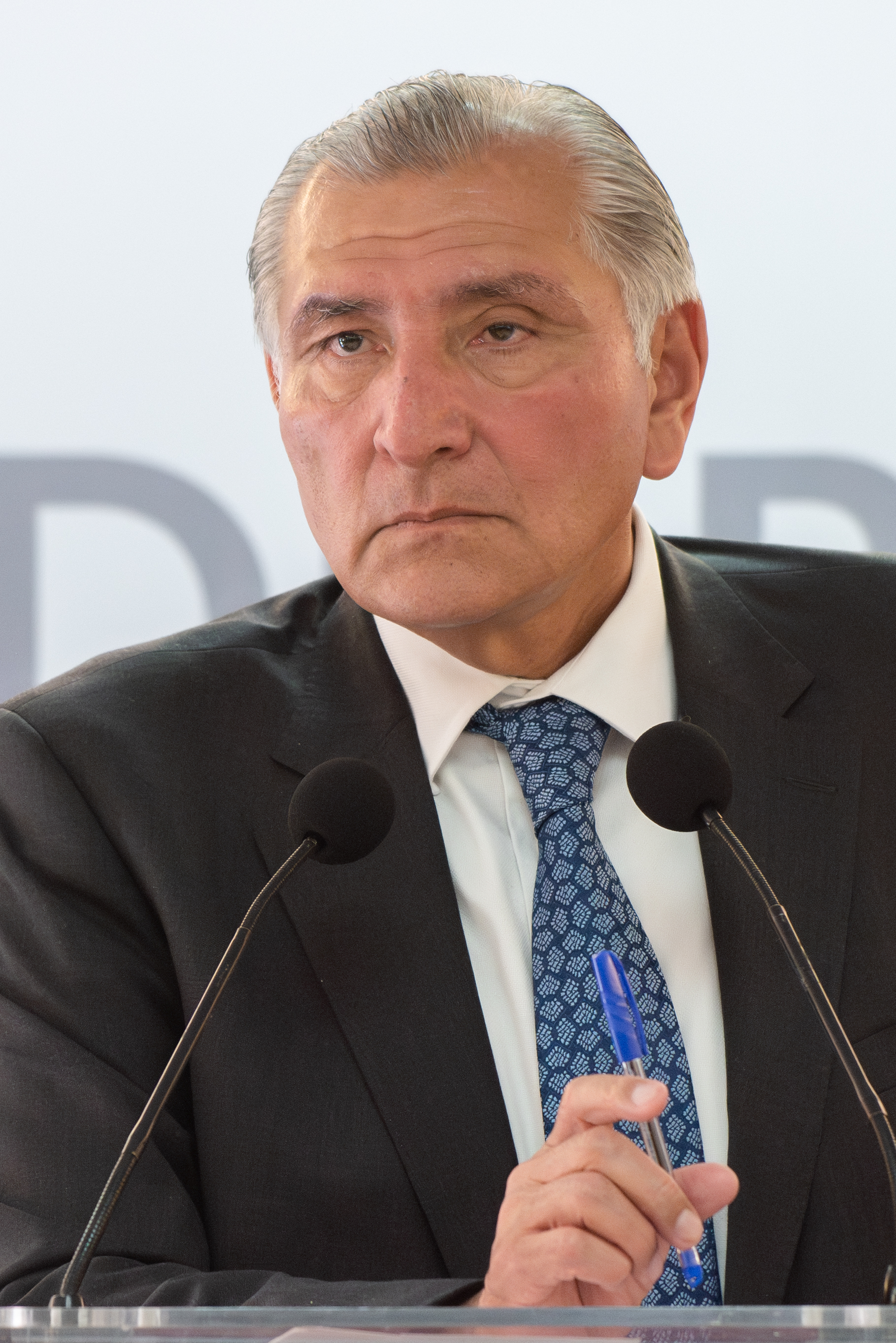
- Adán Augusto López in 2023

Secretary of the Interior
- In office 26 August 2021 – 16 June 2023
- President: Andrés Manuel López Obrador
- Preceded by: Olga Sánchez Cordero
- Succeeded by: Alejandro Encinas Rodríguez (Acting)

Governor of Tabasco
- In office 1 January 2019 – 26 August 2021
- Preceded by: Arturo Núñez Jiménez
- Succeeded by: Carlos Merino Campos

Senator for Tabasco
- In office 1 September 2012 – 11 February 2018
- Preceded by: Arturo Núñez Jiménez
- Succeeded by: Carlos Merino Campos

Member of the Chamber of Deputies for Tabasco's 4th district
- In office 1 September 2009 – 31 August 2012
- Preceded by: Fernando Mayans Canabal
- Succeeded by: Gerardo Gaudiano Rovirosa

Personal details
- Born: 24 September 1963 (age 63) Paraíso, Tabasco, Mexico
- Party: Morena (since 2014)
- Other political affiliations: Party of the Democratic Revolution (2001–2014); Institutional Revolutionary Party (1976–2001)
- Relations: Rosalinda López Hernández (Sister)
- Education: Juarez Autonomous University of Tabasco (LLB); Paris 2 Panthéon-Assas University (LLM)
- Occupation: Lawyer

Adán Augusto López Hernández (born September 24, 1963) is a Mexican politician, lawyer and notary public who currently serves as a Senator of the Republic and President of the Political Coordination Board (JUCOPO) in the Mexican Senate, a role he assumed on September 1, 2024. He previously served as governor of Tabasco from January 2019 until August 2021, date on which he was appointed Secretary of the Interior by President Andrés Manuel López Obrador. López Hernández joined the political party MORENA in 2015, has formerly held office as senator and congressman in the Tabasco State Congress (2007-2009), the LXI Legislature of the Federal Chamber of Deputies (2009-2012), the Senate in its LXIV Legislature (2012-2018) and has been linked to La Barredora criminal organization.

== Personal life ==
López was born on September 24, 1963, in Paraíso, Tabasco, to the school teacher Aurora Hernández Sánchez and Payambé López Falconi, who was a lawyer and a 'Diego de Godoy Medal' laureate notary public. He is married to Dea Isabel Estrada Rodríguez and they have three sons: Adán Payambé López Estrada, Augusto Andrés López Estrada and Adrián Jesús López Estrada.

== Academic formation ==
López presented his thesis "El Estado Federal Mexicano" and graduated summa cum laude, earning a degree in law from the Universidad Juárez Autónoma de Tabasco in 1984. By 1987, López had successfully partaken in a program of postgraduate studies on comparative law at the Institut de Droit Comparé de Paris, earning a master's degree in political sciences from the School of Law, Economics and Social Sciences of the University of Paris II Panthéon-Assas, a faculty of the Sorbonne University. He worked as lawyer and notary in the 1980s and 1990s, holding several positions in Tabasco state government, as for example, the head of the Local Board of Conciliation and Arbitration and deputy secretary of Government and Legal Matters.

== Incursion into politics ==
Through 2003, he was a member of the Institutional Revolutionary Party, which included a stint as the state party's secretary general. He served as the campaign coordinator for Manuel Andrade Díaz's 2000 gubernatorial bid; after the elections were annulled by the TEPJF, he positioned himself as a candidate to be the interim governor in the ensuing August 2001 elections, then stepped aside to help the party choose a candidate, who turned out to be Díaz.

=== As a PRD member ===
In 2003, López switched parties from the PRI to the Party of the Democratic Revolution (PRD), and it was under this banner that he was elected to the state and federal legislatures. He served in the Tabasco state congress from 2007 to 2009, where he was the PRD group leader, and then was elected to the Chamber of Deputies for the LXI Legislature. In San Lázaro, he sat on five commissions, including secretary posts on two: Strengthening of Federalism and Special for the Grijalva-Usumacinta River Valleys. After his term as a deputy, voters in Tabasco elected López to the Senate for the LXII and LXIII Legislatures. Within months of taking office, on January 23, 2013, he left the PRD and initially became an independent. Shortly into the second half of his term, on October 10, 2015, López resigned from his seat, being replaced by Carlos Manuel Merino Campos, and made the second party switch of his career as he sought to become the head of Morena in Tabasco, a post he would win and hold until resigning to run for governor in late 2017.

=== Tabasco gubernatorial campaign ===
In February 2018, López became the only gubernatorial candidate for Morena and its Juntos Haremos Historia coalition in the 2018 Tabasco state elections after the other candidate dropped out and endorsed him. Competing in the home state of Morena's presidential candidate Andrés Manuel López Obrador, polling through the race showed him with a wide advantage. The candidacy also attracted some concern from members of Morena, who accused him of falsifying documents in real estate transactions as a notary, which allegedly benefitted his family.

Exit polling on election night gave López between 61.7 and 69.7 percent of the vote, with a lead of some 40 percentage points over Gerardo Gaudiano, the PRD candidate.

== Alleged fuel-smuggling controversy ==
In September 2025, Mexican investigative outlets and national newspapers reported allegations linking López to a huachicol fiscal fuel-smuggling scheme centered on Dock 289 at the Port of Tampico and to the criminal group "La Barredora" through his former Tabasco security chief, Hernán Bermúdez Requena; López publicly denied any wrongdoing and said he would cooperate with authorities if summoned.

=== Huachicol fiscal allegations ===
An MCCI investigation, presented on Aristegui Noticias, identified businessman Saúl Vera Ochoa—who had publicly supported López's political ambitions—as linked to the concessionaire of Dock 289 in Tampico, where a protected witness and former customs chief, Capt. Alejandro Torres Joaquín ("Santo"), said at least 14 vessels discharged contraband fuel in 2024–2025 while bribes were paid to facilitate entries; companies tied to the concession, including Tampico Terminal Marítima S.A. de C.V., were detailed in witness statements and corporate records cited by reporters. López rejected claims of personal or business ties beyond prior notarial services, urged authorities to clarify Vera's role, and stated that if anyone bears responsibility they should be held to account.

=== La Barredora case ===
Separately, authorities detained former Tabasco security secretary Hernán Bermúdez Requena in Paraguay on 12 September 2025 and expelled him to Mexico on 17 September; he faces charges including criminal association, extortion and express kidnapping and is alleged to lead La Barredora, with media noting prior intelligence reports naming the group. López stated he had no knowledge during his governorship of criminal activities by Bermúdez and expressed willingness to testify if called; the Tabasco state prosecutor's office said in late September that López was not under investigation or summons in the Bermúdez matter.
