= José Antonio de la Vega Asmitia =

Mexican lawyer and politician (born 1963)

- Born: 16 June 1963 (age 62); Tabasco, Mexico
- Occupations: Lawyer and politician
- Political party: PAN

José Antonio de la Vega Asmitia (born 16 June 1963) is a Mexican lawyer and politician affiliated with the National Action Party. As of 2014 he served as Deputy of the LIX Legislature of the Mexican Congress as a plurinominal representative.
