= Gerardo Gaudiano Rovirosa =

Mexican politician

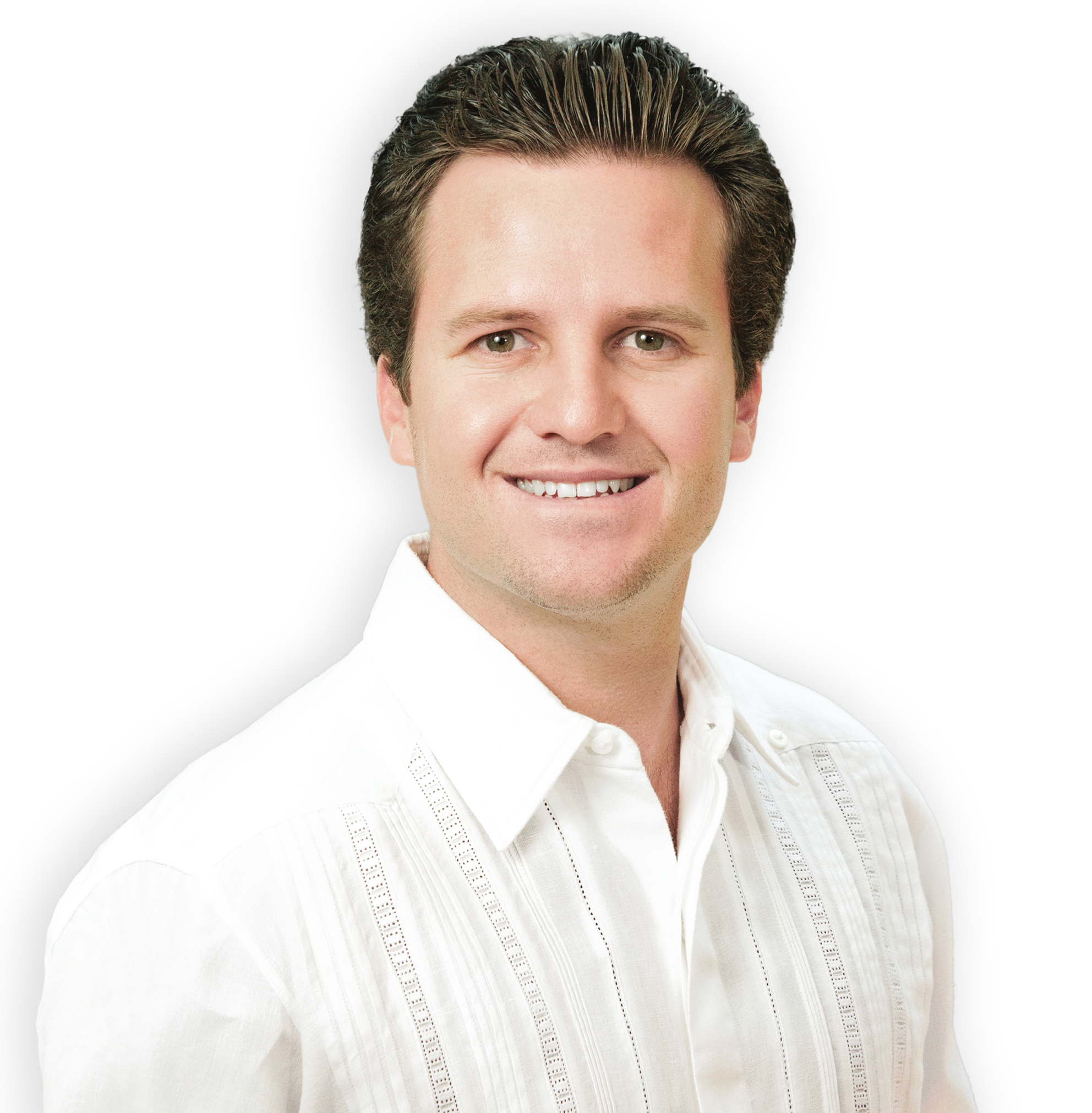

Deputy of the Congress of the Union for Tabasco's 4th district
- In office 1 September 2012 – 31 August 2015
- Preceded by: Adán Augusto López Hernández
- Succeeded by: Liliana Ivete Madrigal Pérez

Personal details
- Born: 10 January 1981 (age 45) Centro, Tabasco, Mexico
- Occupation: Politician

Gerardo Gaudiano Rovirosa (born 10 January 1981) is a Mexican politician previously affiliated with the Party of the Democratic Revolution (PRD). As a member of that party, he served as a federal deputy in the 62nd Congress (2012–2015) representing Tabasco's fourth district.

Gaudiano Rovirosa unsuccessfully sought election as one of Tabasco's senators in the 2024 Senate election, occupying the first place on the Citizens' Movement's two-name formula. The MC formula came third in the race, behind the election's two broad coalitions.

== See also ==
- List of municipal presidents of Centro Municipality, Tabasco
