= Fernando Mayans Canabal =

Mexican politician (born 1963)

Fernando Enrique Mayans
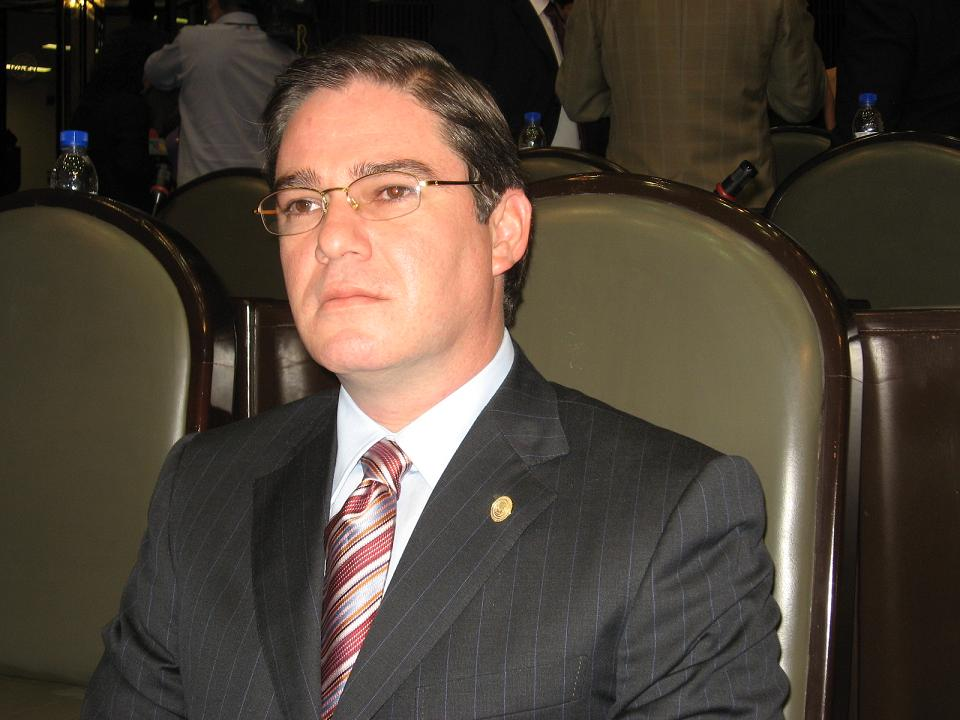

Deputy of the Congress of the Union for Tabasco's 4th district
- In office 1 September 2006 – 31 August 2009
- Preceded by: Eugenio Mier y Concha
- Succeeded by: Adán Augusto López Hernández

Personal details
- Born: 5 April 1963 (age 62)
- Party: PRD
- Occupation: Politician

Fernando Enrique Mayans Canabal (born 5 April 1963) is a Mexican politician affiliated with the Party of the Democratic Revolution (PRD).

In the 2006 general election he was elected to the Chamber of Deputies to represent Tabasco's 4th district during the 60th session of Congress (2006–2009).

In the 2012 general election he was elected to the Senate for the state of Tabasco (62nd and 63rd congressional sessions). He also served as a local deputy in the Congress of Tabasco in 2001–2003.
