= Federal Ministerial Police =

Mexican intelligence agency

Federal Ministerial Police Policía Federal Ministerial
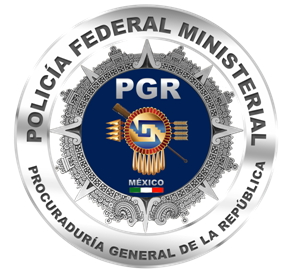
- Abbreviation: PFM

Agency overview
- Formed: 30 May 2009; 17 years ago
- Preceding agency: Agencia Federal de Investigación
- Employees: 8,500

Jurisdictional structure
- Federal agency: Mexico
- Operations jurisdiction: Mexico
- Constituting instrument: Decree of the Union Executive on November 1, 2001
- General nature: Federal law enforcement

Operational structure
- Headquarters: Mexico City, Mexico
- Parent agency: Criminal Investigation Agency

Website
- www.pgr.gob.mx (Spanish)

The Federal Ministerial Police (Spanish: Policía Federal Ministerial, PFM) is a Mexican federal agency tasked with fighting corruption and organized crime, through an executive order by President Felipe Calderón. The agency is directed by the Attorney General's Office (FGR) and may have been partly modeled on the Federal Bureau of Investigation of the United States. PFM agents in action often wear masks to prevent themselves from being identified by gang leaders. PFM agents are uniformed when carrying out raids.

"Street-level" uniformed federal police patrols and transport terminal security are handled by the service personnel of the National Guard.

== History ==
It was formed in 2009 as a reform and renaming of the Federal Investigative Agency (Agencia Federal de Investigación or AFI) which had replaced an earlier agency, the Federal Judicial Police. Some agents of the Federal Investigations Agency were believed to work as enforcers for the Sinaloa Cartel. The Attorney General's Office reported in December 2005 that 1,500 of 7,000 AFI agents — nearly 25% of the force — were under investigation for suspected criminal activity and 457 were facing charges.

In November 2008, Rodolfo de la Guardia García, the No. 2 official in the AFI from 2003 to 2005, was placed under arrest as investigators looked into the possibility that he leaked information to the Sinaloa Cartel in return for monthly payments.

On 29 May 2009, the Federal Investigations Agency was restructured and renamed.

== Organization ==
- General Directorate of Ministerial and Judicial Mandates
- General Directorate of Special Security Services and Protection of Persons
- General Directorate of Police Investigation In Support of Mandates
- General Directorate of International Police Matters - Interpol
- General Directorate of Communications Center
- General Directorate of Technical Support and Logisti

== See also ==
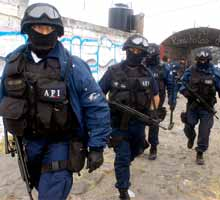
AFI agents in Michoacán

- Afghan National Police
- Civil Police (Brazil)
- Federal Bureau of Investigation
- Federales
- Federal police
- Federal Security Service (Russia)
- Guardia di Finanza
- Iraqi Police
- Central Directorate of the Judicial Police of the National Police (France)
- People's Armed Police
- Royal Canadian Mounted Police (RCMP)
- Scotland Yard
- Serious Organised Crime Agency (SOCA)
