= Timeline of Villahermosa =

Coordinates: 17.989167°N 92.928056°W

The following is a timeline of the history of the city of Villahermosa in Centro Municipality, Tabasco state, Mexico.

== Prior to 20th century ==
- 1596 - Settlement founded.
- 1598 - Settlement named "Villahermosa".
- 1677 - Regional seat of government relocated from Villahermosa to Tacotalpa.
- 1797 - Regional seat of government relocated to Villahermosa from Tacotalpa.
- 1824
  - Villahermosa becomes capital of State of Tabasco.
  - Congress of Tabasco headquartered in town.
  - Printing press in operation.
- 1826
  - Town renamed "San Juan Bautista".
  - Argos Tabasqueño newspaper begins publication.
- 1846 - 24–26 October: First Battle of Tabasco against U.S. forces.
- 1847
  - 15–16 June: Second Battle of Tabasco.
  - Regional seat of government relocated from Villahermosa to Tacotalpa.
- 1880 - Roman Catholic Diocese of Tabasco established.
- 1881 - El Tabasqueño newspaper in publication.
- 1890 - Casa de los azulejos (residence) built.
- 1894 - Governor's Palace (Tabasco) built on the Plaza de Armas de Villahermosa.
- 1895 - Population: 9,604.
- 1900 - Population: 10,548.

== 20th century ==
- 1915 - City named "Villahermosa" again.
- 1921 - Diario de Tabasco newspaper begins publication.
- 1924 - Liga Central de Resistencia (political group) headquartered in city.
- 1932 - 12 October: Flood.
- 1958 - Parque-Museo La Venta (museum) opens.
- 1974 - Villahermosa Institute of Technology established.
- 1977 - Oil discovered near city (approximate date).
- 1979 - Pérez International Airport inaugurated.
- 1982
  - 1 January: Tabasco state election, 1982 held.
  - Casa de Artes (cultural institution) founded.
- 1987
  - Peñitas Dam commissioned near city on the Grijalva River.
  - Tabasco Hoy newspaper begins publication.
- 1988
  - 9 October: Tabasco state election, 1988 held.
  - Museo de Historia Natural José Narciso Rovirosa (museum) opens.
- 1990
  - Catedral del Señor de Tabasco (church) built.
  - Population: 261,131 city; 386,776 Centro Municipality.
- 1994 - 20 November: Tabasco state election, 1994 held.
- 1995 - Population: 301,328 city; 465,449 Centro Municipality.
- 1999 - September: Flood.
- 2000
  - 15 October: Tabasco state election, 2000 held.
  - Mormon temple built.
  - Population: 430,846 city; 520,308 Centro Municipality.

== 21st century ==
- 2005 - Population: 558,524 city; 664,629 Centro Municipality.
- 2006 - 15 October: 2006 Tabasco state election held.
- 2007 - October: 2007 Tabasco flood.
- 2009 - Jesús Alí de la Torre elected mayor of Centro Municipality.
- 2010 - Population: 353,577 city; 755,425 metro.
- 2012 - 1 July: 2012 Tabasco gubernatorial election held.

== See also ==
- History of Villahermosa (in Spanish)
- Categoría:Villahermosa (in Spanish)
- History of Tabasco (state)
- List of governors of Tabasco state (Spanish version, 1519–present)

== Bibliography ==
- Ernst B. Filsinger (1922), "Mexico: Villahermosa", Commercial Travelers' Guide to Latin America, Washington, DC: Government Printing Office
- Alan Riding (7 February 1983). "Oil Impact on Mexican Town". New York Times.
- John Fisher (1999), "Chiapas and Tabasco: Villahermosa", Mexico, Rough Guides (4th ed.), London, p. 496+, OL 24935876M
- Julia Preston (25 October 1999). "Villahermosa Journal; A Rising Tide Lifts All Political Resentments". New York Times.
