= 2012 Tabasco gubernatorial election =

The 2012 gubernatorial election in the Mexican state of Tabasco we held on Sunday, July 1, 2012. Incumbent Tabasco Governor Andrés Granier Melo of the Institutional Revolutionary Party (PRI) is retiring due to mandatory term limits, which limit all Mexican state governors to one, six-year term in office. The Tabasco gubernatorial election coincided with the 2012 Mexican presidential and general elections.

== Candidates ==
Party/Coalition	Candidates	Votes	
National Action Party	Gerardo Priego Tapia	47,326	4.82%
Institutional Revolutionary Party; Ecologist Green Party of Mexico; New Alliance Party	Jesús Alí de la Torre	430,313	43.79%
Party of the Democratic Revolution; Labor Party; Citizens' Movement	Arturo Núñez Jiménez	504,738	51.38 %
