= List of municipal presidents of Centro, Tabasco =

The following is a list of municipal presidents of Centro Municipality, Tabasco, Mexico. Centro includes the city of Villahermosa.

== List of officials ==
- José Medardo Rosado, 1930
- Cesar A. Rojas Contreras, 1930-1934
- Juan Palomeque Hernández, 1934
- Ernesto Trujillo Gurría, 1937-1938
- Marcos Buendía Pérez, 1940-1942
- Torcuato Brindis de la Flor, 1943-1945
- Juan Pérez Arrollave, 1946
- Alfonso Sosa Vera, 1949-1952
- Regulo Torpey Andrade, 1953-1955
- José Guimond Caballero, 1956-1958
- Mario A. Brown Peralta, 1959-1961
- Ángel Mario Martínez Zentella, 1962-1964
- Gustavo Hernández Loroño, 1965
- Oscar Quintero Martínez de Escobar, 1965-1967
- Antonio Ocampo Ramírez, 1968-1970
- Roberto Rosado Sastre, 1971-1973
- Ramón Magaña Romero, 1974-1976
- Manuel Gurría Ordóñez, 1977
- Agustín Beltrán Bastar, 1977-1979
- Pascual Bellizia Castañeda, 1980-1982
- Gustavo Rosario Torres, 1983-1985
- J. Amador Izundegui Rullán, 1986-1988
- Cesar A. Rojas Herrera, 1989-1991
- Manuel Suárez Herrera, 1992-1994
- Jesús Taracena Martínez, 1995-1997
- Edgar Azcuaga Cabrera (interim), 1997
- Georgina Trujillo Zentella, 1998-2000
- Irving Orozco Juárez (interim), 2000
- Andrés Granier Melo, 2001-2003
- Florizel Medina Péreznieto, 2004-2006
- José Antonio Compañ Abreu (interim), 2006
- Evaristo Hernández Cruz, 2006–2009, 2018-2021
- Jesús Alí de la Torre, 2010-2011
- Cuauhtémoc Muñoz Calderas (interim), 2012
- Humberto de los Santos Bertruy, 2013-2015
- Francisco Peralta Burelo, 2015
- Gerardo Gaudiano Rovirosa, 2015-2018
- Casilda Ruiz Agustín (interim), 2018

== See also ==
- 2006 Tabasco state election
- 2018 Tabasco state election
- Municipalities of Tabasco
- Timeline of Villahermosa
