= Juan Cáceres =

Juan Cáceres is the name of:

- Juan Cáceres (racing driver) (born 1984), Uruguayan racing driver
- Juan Cáceres (footballer, born 1949), Peruvian football goalkeeper
- Juan Cáceres (footballer, born 2002), Paraguayan football midfielder
- Juan Francisco Cáceres (born 1962), Mexican politician
- Juan Carlos Cáceres (1936–2015), Argentinian musician
- Juan Daniel Cáceres (born 1973), Paraguayan football defender
- Juan Ignacio Cáceres (born 1992), Argentine sprint kayaker
- Juan José Cáceres (born 2000), Paraguayan football right-back
