= César Raúl Ojeda Zubieta =

Mexican politician

César Raúl Ojeda Zubieta (born July 20, 1952) is a Mexican politician, member of the Party of the Democratic Revolution, previously member of the Institutional Revolutionary Party; is for third consecutive occasion, candidate of the PRD for Governor of Tabasco.

César Raúl Ojeda was born in Villahermosa, Tabasco. He studied political science at the National Autonomous University of Mexico and is a well-known businessman in the hotel industry. He began his political career inside the Institutional Revolutionary Party, serving in the LII Legislature of the Congress of Tabasco. That carried him as the candidate for Tabasco's 1st district to the LVI Legislature in 1994 then he was elected.

In 2000 the PRD nominated him as their candidate for governor, after he left the PRI with the supposed insurance that he would be the candidate of the PRD to the governorship, Andrés Manuel López Obrador, to decide to compete for the Government of the Federal District, in these elections was faced for first you see that PRI candidate Manuel Andrade Díaz, the elections gave the triumph to Andrade, the Federal Electoral Tribunal resolved the annulment of the elections that to consider that the government state headline by Roberto Madrazo Pintado had favored illegally to Andrade, the elections were repeated with the same candidates and Ojeda again was defeated, although the accused again that PRI candidate of fraud.

According to results of the Electoral Institute of the State of Tabasco, not winner of this electoral process resulted, nevertheless, itself informed of the results of the election before the Federal Electoral Tribunal, that on December 27, 2006 emitted its resolution, declaring 7 polling stations annulled, but ratifying the triumph of Andrés Granier Melo, to declare that the Coalition for the Good of All managed to show the irregularities that had denounced.

== See also ==
- 2006 Tabasco state election
