= 2006 Tabasco state election =

2006 Tabasco gubernatorial election
← 2000	15 October 2006	2012 →
Nominee	Andrés Granier Melo	César Raúl Ojeda
Party	PRI	PRI
Popular vote	436,836	355,669
Percentage	51.77%	41.15%
Governor before election
Manuel Andrade Diaz
PRI
Elected Governor
Andrés Granier Melo
PRI

The 2006 Tabasco state election was held in the Mexican state of Tabasco on Sunday, 15 October 2006 to elect the Governor of Tabasco, municipal presidents across the state, and local deputies in the state Congress.

The election took place months after the 2006 presidential election, in which PRD candidate Andrés Manuel López Obrador narrowly lost. The gubernatorial election was seen as a test for Obrador, who won Tabasco in the election, and the PRD. PRI candidate Andrés Rafael Granier Melo ultimately defeated PRD candidate César Raúl Ojeda Zubieta.

== Offices contested ==
A local election was held in the Mexican state of Tabasco on Sunday, 15 October 2006. Voters went to the polls to elect, on the local level:

- A new Governor of Tabasco to serve for a six-year term.
- 17 municipal presidents (mayors) to serve for a three-year term.
- Local deputies to serve for a three-year term in the Congress of Tabasco.

== Gubernatorial election ==
Eight political parties participate in the 2006 Tabasco state election; two of them (the PRD and PT) joined forces. The election was won by Andrés Rafael Granier Melo of the PRI, who received 51.77% of the vote. PRD candidate César Raúl Ojeda Zubieta came in second place, with 41.15% of the vote.

=== PRD campaign ===
The election was seen as a key test for the PRD, which had nominated Andrés Manuel López Obrador in the 2006 presidential election held months prior. Lopez Obrador had won the state comfortably in the presidential election, and campaigned for PRD gubernatorial candidate Ojeda. The Los Angeles Times reported that the 2006 teachers' strike in neighboring Oaxaca hindered the popularity of the left-wing PRD among voters.

Party/Alliance	Candidate
National Action Party (PAN)	Juan Francisco Cáceres de la Fuente
Institutional Revolutionary Party (PRI)	Andrés Rafael Granier Melo
Alliance for the Good of All (PRD, PT)	César Raúl Ojeda Zubieta
Ecologist Green Party of Mexico (PVEM)	Pascual Bellizzia Rosique
New Alliance (PANAL)	Manuel Paz Ojeda
Social Democratic and Peasant Alternative Party (PASDC)	
Convergence (CD) (Note: Although CD participated in the election the party decided to have no candidate for Governor of Tabasco while the PASDC decided, at the end of the campaign, to support the PRD-PT candidate.)	
