= Mónica Fernández Balboa =

Mexican architect and politician (born 1966)

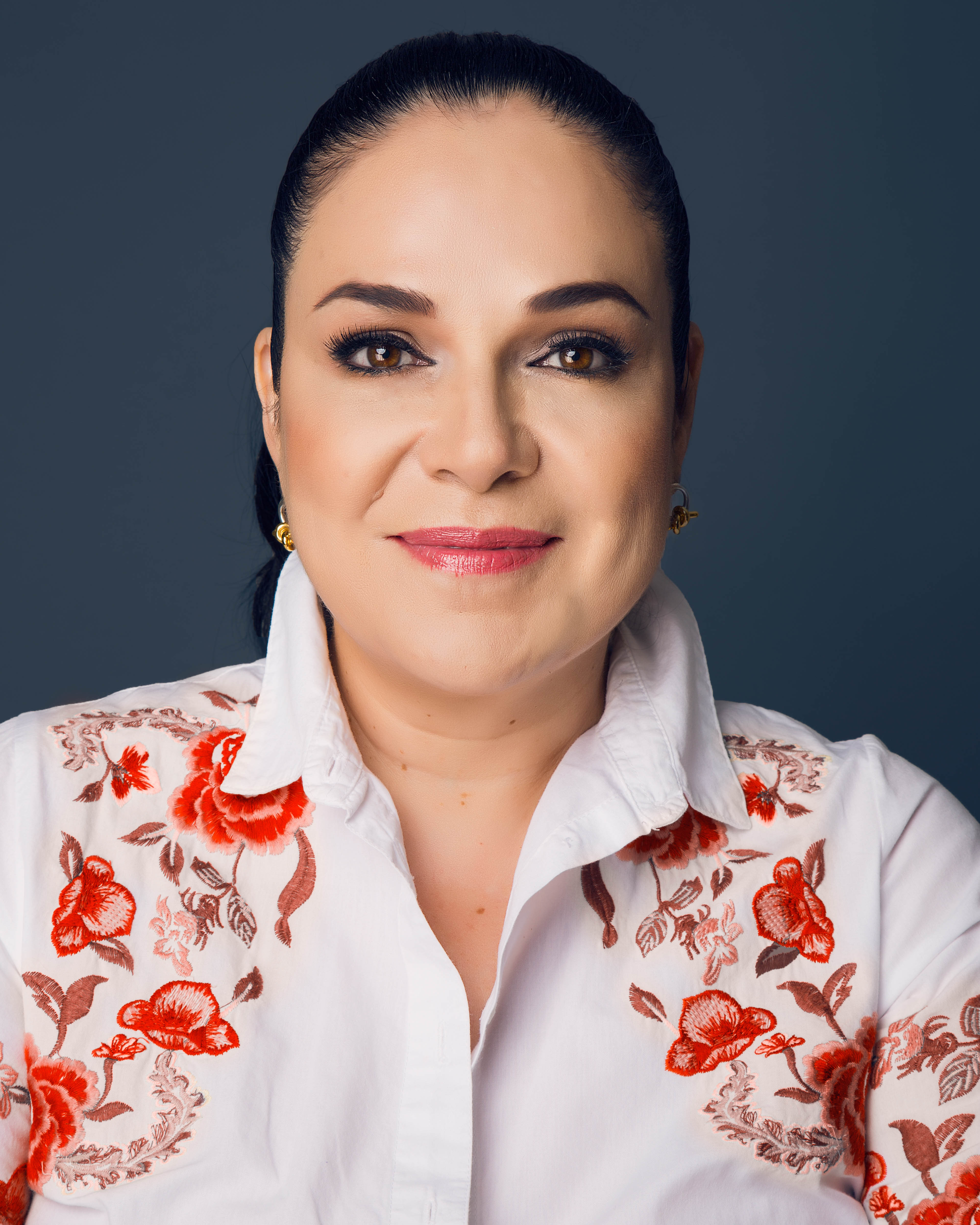

President of the Senate
- In office 1 September 2019 – 31 August 2020
- Preceded by: Martí Batres Guadarrama
- Succeeded by: Eduardo Ramírez Aguilar

Senator for Tabasco
- In office 1 September 2018 – 31 August 2024 Serving with Javier May Rodríguez and Juan Manuel Fócil Pérez
- Preceded by: Carlos Manuel Merino Campos

Member of the Chamber of Deputies for Tabasco's 6th district
- In office 1 September 2006 – 31 August 2009
- Preceded by: Amalin Yabur Elías
- Succeeded by: José Córdova Hernández

Personal details
- Born: 4 July 1966 (age 59) Teapa, Tabasco, Mexico
- Party: MORENA
- Other political affiliations: PRD (until 2014)
- Spouse: Carlos Rojas Gutiérrez
- Education: Universidad Autónoma de Guadalajara

Mónica Fernández Balboa (born 4 July 1966) is a Mexican architect and politician from the National Regeneration Movement (Morena) who previously belonged to the Party of the Democratic Revolution (PRD).

She served in the Senate for Tabasco during the 64th Congress (2018–2021). From 1 September 2019 to 31 August 2020, she served as President of the Senate, to which she was elected with 110 votes in favor, one against, and two abstentions.

As a member of the PRD, from 2006 to 2009, she served in the Chamber of Deputies during the 60th Congress for Tabasco's 6th district.
