= Ariadna Montiel =

Mexican politician (born 1974)

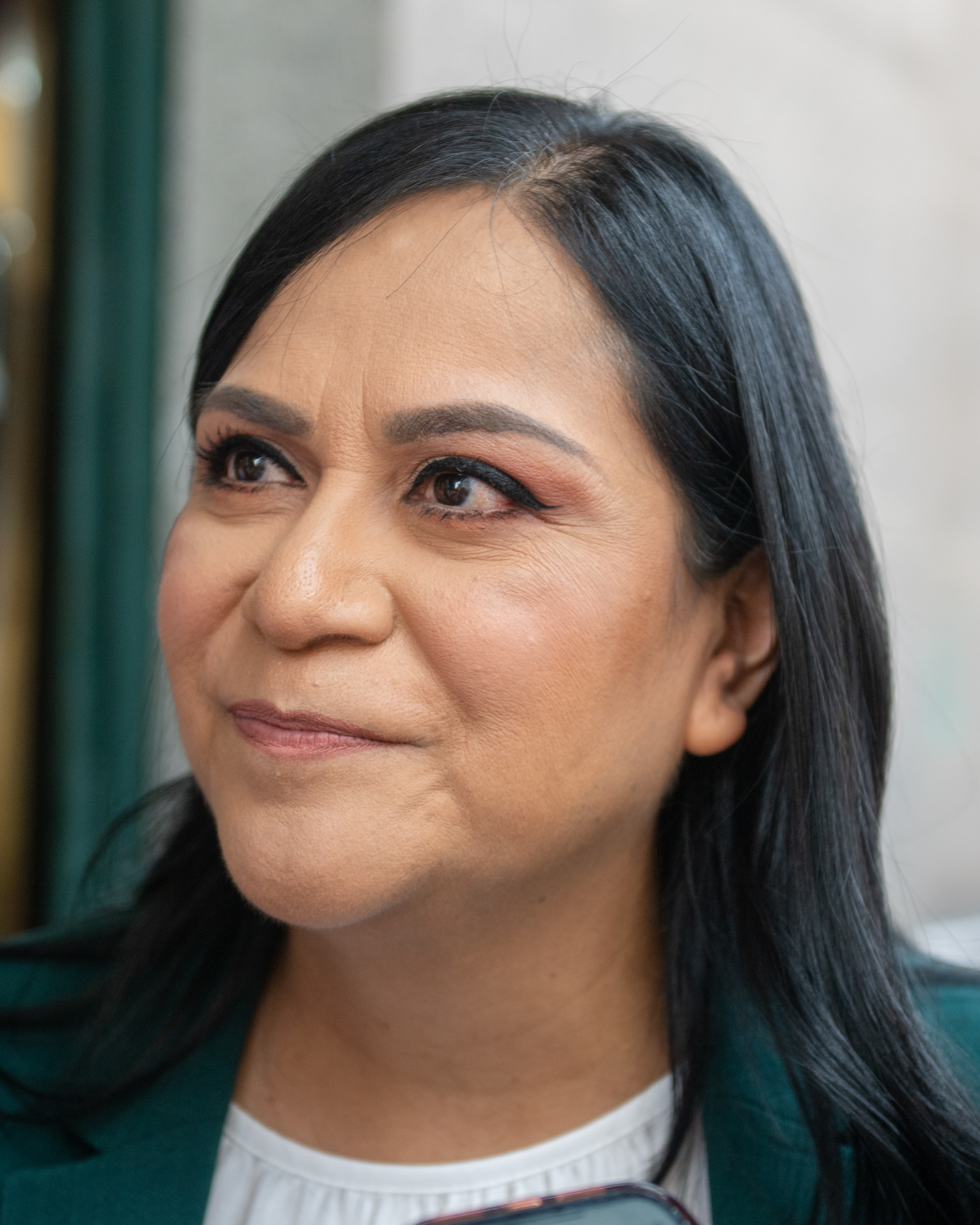
- Montiel Reyes in 2024

President of the National Regeneration Movement
- Incumbent
- Assumed office 3 May 2026
- Preceded by: Luisa Alcalde

Secretary of Welfare
- In office 11 January 2022 – 29 April 2026
- President: Andrés Manuel López Obrador; Claudia Sheinbaum
- Preceded by: Javier May Rodríguez
- Succeeded by: Leticia Ramírez Amaya

Personal details
- Born: Ariadna Montiel Reyes; 29 May 1974 (age 52) Mexico City, Mexico
- Party: Morena (since 2018)
- Other political affiliations: Party of the Democratic Revolution (1994–2015)
- Education: National Autonomous University of Mexico

Ariadna Montiel Reyes (Note: In this Mexican name, the surname is Montiel and the second or maternal family name is Reyes.) (born 29 May 1974) is a Mexican politician serving as president of the National Regeneration Movement (Morena) since May 2026. She previously served as secretary of welfare from 2022 until 2026 and, from 2018 to 2022, as undersecretary of welfare.

== Political career ==
Ariadna Montiel Reyes was born in Mexico City in 1974, where she studied architecture at the National Autonomous University of Mexico (UNAM). In the early 2000s she held various positions within the Party of the Democratic Revolution (PRD) and, in the 2006 general election, she was elected to the Senate as the alternate of María Rojo (but never had occasion to serve).

Between 2012 and 2015 she was a deputy of the Legislative Assembly of the Federal District, including a term as the Assembly's president. In the 2015 mid-terms she was elected to the Chamber of Deputies on the PRD ticket to represent Mexico City's 23rd district (Coyoacán) during the 63rd session of Congress. At the start of the congressional session, Montiel resigned from the PRD and sat as an independent. In February 2016 she joined the congressional bloc of the National Regeneration Movement (Morena).

She took office as the undersecretary for social and human development within the Secretariat of Welfare at the start of the presidential term of Andrés Manuel López Obrador in December 2018. On 11 January 2022 she was appointed secretary of welfare, replacing Javier May Rodríguez. On 4 July 2024, incoming president Claudia Sheinbaum announced that Montiel would remain as secretary of welfare at the start of her administration in October 2024.

On 3 May 2026, she was elected president of the National Regeneration Movement, replacing Luisa Alcalde.
