= Joaquin Ruiz =

Joaquín Ruiz may refer to:

- Joaquín Ruiz-Giménez (1913–2009), Spanish politician and jurist, minister of education under Franco
- Joaquín Ruiz Jiménez (Spanish politician) (1854–1934), mayor of Madrid in 1912–1913
- Joaquín Ruiz Jiménez (Mexican politician) (fl. 1910s), Mexican politician, governor of Tabasco in 1917–1918
- Joaquín Ruiz Llorente (born 1959), Spanish judoka
- Joaquín Ruiz Lorente (born 1966), Spanish basketball player
