= Amalin Yabur Elías =

Mexican politician

Member of the Chamber of Deputies for Tabasco's 6th district
- In office 1 September 2003 – 31 August 2006
- Preceded by: Jesús Taracena Martínez
- Succeeded by: Mónica Fernández Balboa

Member of the Congress of Tabasco for the 5th local district
- In office 1 January 2001 – 1 January 2003
- Preceded by: Evaristo Hernández Cruz
- Succeeded by: Luis Felipe Graham Zapata

Personal details
- Born: 7 September 1951 (age 74) Villahermosa, Tabasco, Mexico
- Party: PRI
- Occupation: Politician

Amalin Yabur Elías (born 7 September 1951) is a Mexican politician from the Institutional Revolutionary Party (PRI). In the 2003 mid-terms she was elected to the Chamber of Deputies to represent Tabasco's 6th district during the 59th session of Congress.
