= Governor González =

Governor González may refer to:

== Colombia ==
- Guillermo González Mosquera (1941–2021), governor of Cauca in 2007–2010

== Colonial Spain ==
- Vicente González (governor), governor of Florida from 1577 to 1578 and governor of Santa Elena, la Florida, from c. 1577 to 1580
- Romualdo Palacio González (1827–1907), governor of Puerto Rico in 1887
- Vicente González de Santianes, governor of Nuevo León from 1773 to 1788

== Mexico ==
- Abraham González (governor) (1864–1913), governor of Chihuahua in 1910 and 1911
- Alejandro González Alcocer (born 1951), governor of Baja California from 1998 to 2001
- Aurelio L. González (1860–1927), governor of Aguascalientes from 1917 to 1920
- Eduardo González Arévalo (1832–1867), governor of Tabasco from 1863 to 1864
- Emilio González Márquez (born 1960), governor of Jalisco from 2007 to 2013
- Enrique González Pedrero (1930–2021), governor of Tabasco from 1983 to 1987
- Felipe González González (1947–2023), governor of Aguascalientes from 1998 to 2004
- Félix González Canto (born 1968), governor of Quintana Roo from 2005 to 2011
- Francisco González de la Vega (1901–1976), governor of Durango from 1956 to 1962
- Jesús González Ortega (1822–1881), governor of both Puebla and Zacatecas on different occasions
- José González Gallo (1900–1957), governor of Jalisco from 1947 to 1953
- José Natividad González Parás (born 1949), governor of Nuevo León from 2003 to 2009
- Manuel González Cosío y Rivera (1915–2002), governor of Querétaro from 1961 to 1967
- Manuel González Flores (1833–1893), governor of Michoacán in 1877, governor of Guanajuato from 1885 to 1893
- Margarita González Saravia (born 1956), governor of Morelos since 2024
- Mariano González Zarur (born 1949), governor of Tlaxcala from 2011 to 2016
- Ney González Sánchez (born 1963), governor of Nayarit from 2005 to 2011
- Patrocinio González Garrido (1934–2021), governor of Chiapas from 1988 to 1993
- Salomón González Blanco (1900–1992), governor of Chiapas from 1977 to 1979
- Saúl González Herrera (1915–2006), governor of Chihuahua from 1985 to 1986

== Puerto Rico ==
- Jenniffer González Colón (born 1976), incumbent since 2025
