= Georgina Trujillo Zentella =

Mexican politician (born 1962)

- Born: 17 December 1962 (age 63); Mexico City, Mexico
- Occupation: Politician
- Political party: PRI

Georgina Trujillo Zentella (born 17 December 1962) is a Mexican politician affiliated with the Institutional Revolutionary Party. She currently serves as a federal deputy in the LXIII Legislature of the Mexican Congress, representing Tabasco from the third electoral region.

== Life ==
In 1982, Trujillo joined the PRI and began running the secondary school at Colegio Arji, S.C.; she then went on to work at two hotels in Villahermosa and serve as a financial advisor while obtaining a degree in administration from the Universidad Juárez Autónoma de Tabasco. In addition to her involvement with the Programa Mundo Maya, where she represented the private sector and coordinated its efforts in Tabasco, Trujillo also briefly was involved with the National Confederation of Popular Organizations as its coordinator of cultural action.

In 1992, Trujillo took a position in the Secretariat of Industrial, Commercial and Tourism Promotion of Tabasco; after brief stints as Central Director of the INAH in Tabasco and as the coordinator of advisors to the Governor of Tabasco, she was tapped to head the state branch of Fundación Colosio in 1995, remaining in the post for two years.

In 1998, Trujillo was elected as the municipal president of Centro Municipality, which contains the state capital of Villahermosa; also at this time, she became a national PRI councilor and served as the vice president of the National Federation of Municipalities of Mexico. In 2000, she resigned in order to run for Senate, and voters elected her to a seat for the LVIII and LIX Legislatures. She presided over the Hydraulic Resources Commission and sat on those for Regional Development, Federalism and Municipal Development, Administration, Youth and Sports, and Special on Relations between Colima and Jalisco. While a senator, she briefly served as the Secretary for the Action and Social Management Program of the national PRI, and she wrote a book, La Ruta del Edén, which was released in 2005.

After her time in the Senate came to a close, Trujillo was elected as a local deputy to the LIX Legislature of the Congress of Tabasco. Three years later, however, she returned to the federal legislature, this time the Chamber of Deputies, for the LXI Legislature. She was a secretary of its board of directors and sat on the Energy, Navy, and Budget and Public Accounts Commissions.

Between 2012 and 2015, Trujillo served in the federal cabinet as the undersecretary of agricultural development for the Secretariat of Agrarian, Land, and Urban Development (SEDATU). In 2015, the PRI placed her on its list of proportional representation deputy candidates from the third region, prompting her resignation from SEDATU and returning her to San Lázaro for the LXIII Legislature. She serves as the president of the Energy Commission and also sits on the Transparency and Anticorruption Commission.

In April 2016, Trujillo expressed her interest in running for governor of Tabasco in 2018.

== See also ==
- List of municipal presidents of Centro Municipality, Tabasco
