= Secretariat of Welfare =

Social affairs ministry of Mexico

- Secretaría de Bienestar
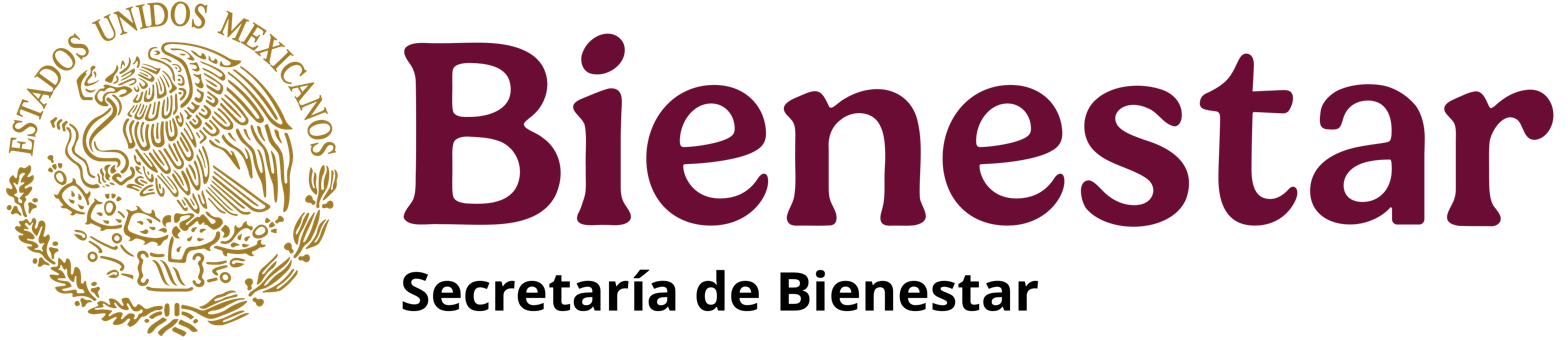

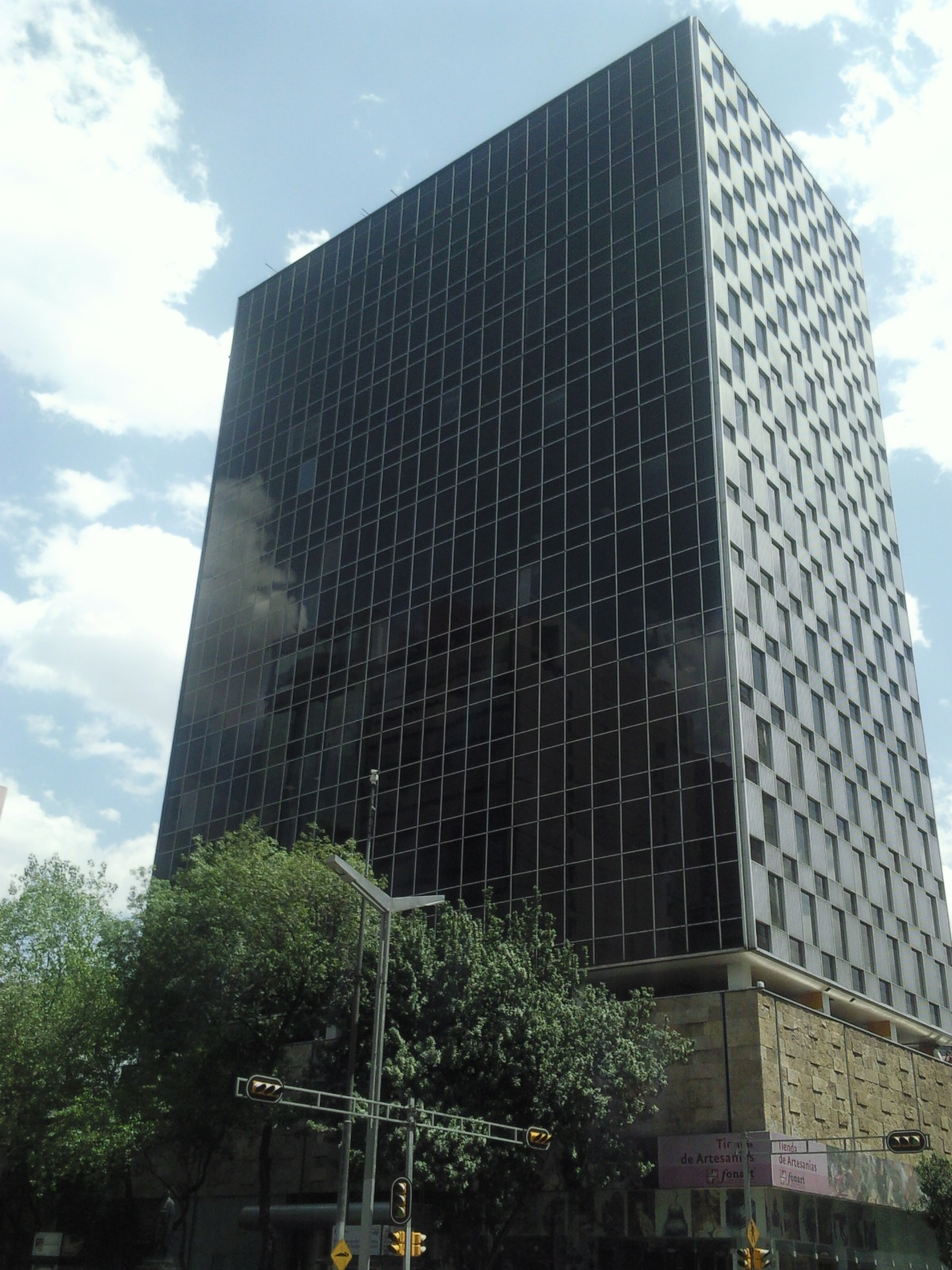
- Offices of the Secretariat of Welfare

Agency overview
- Formed: 1959, under the name Secretariat of Public Works
- Type: Government department
- Headquarters: Av. Paseo de la Reforma 116; Col. Juárez, Delegación Cuauhtémoc; Mexico C.P. 06600
- Agency executives: Leticia Ramírez Amaya; President of Mexico

The Secretariat of Welfare (Spanish: Secretaría de Bienestar) is the government department in charge of social development efforts in Mexico. The Secretary of Welfare is a member of the Executive Cabinet, and is appointed at the discretion of the President of the Republic. The Secretariat of Welfare aims to eliminate poverty through comprehensive, collectively responsible human development, achieve adequate levels of well-being with adjustment to government policies, and improvement through social, economic and political factors in rural and urban areas to enhance local organization, city development and housing.

Between 1992 and 2018, the agency was known as the Secretariat of Social Development (Secretaría de Desarrollo Social), or SEDESOL.

== History ==
The agency was established as the Secretariat of Public Works (Secretaría de Obras Públicas) in 1959. In 1976, it changed its name to the Secretariat of Human Settlements and Public Works (Secretaría de Asentamientos Humanos y Obras Públicas), with another name change in 1982 to Secretariat of Urban Development and Ecology (Secretaría de Desarrollo Urbano y Ecología).

In 1992, the agency became the Secretariat of Social Development. The name changed again in 2018 to the Secretariat of Welfare as part of reforms to the Organic Law of the Federal Public Administration coinciding with the beginning of Andrés Manuel López Obrador's time in office. María Luisa Albores, whom López Obrador tapped to head the agency, said the renamed agency will overhaul and improve existing programs that she described as ineffective.

Logo during the presidency of Felipe Calderón (2006-2012)

Logo during the presidency of Enrique Peña Nieto (2012-2018)

Logo during the presidency of Andrés Manuel López Obrador (2018-2024)

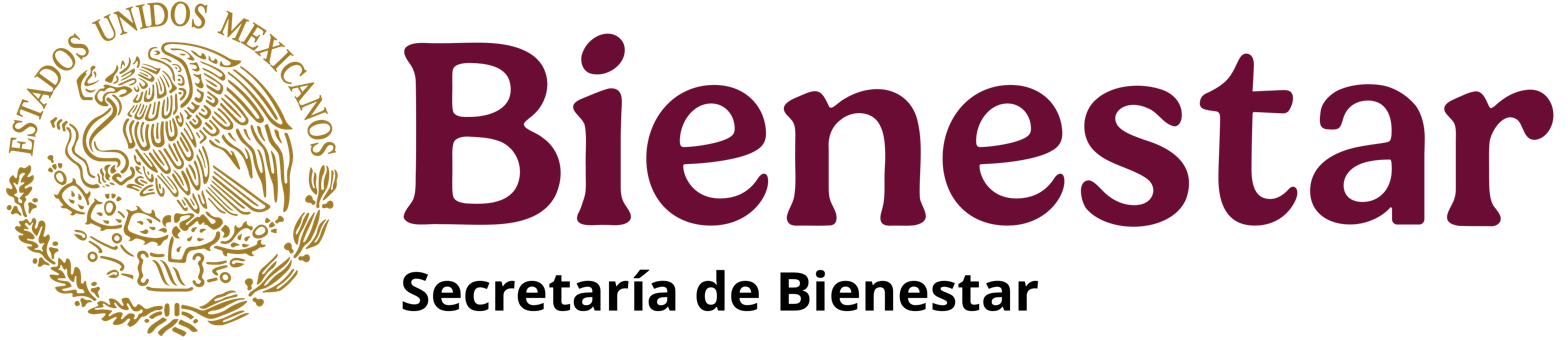
Current logo, under the presidency of Claudia Sheinbaum (2024-present)

== Functions ==
According to the Organic Law of the Federal Public Administration, the direction and contribution of ideas for the fight against poverty, as well as the coordination of the different agencies to work in the same line of interest of the State, corresponds.

Through the coordination of the other agencies of the public administration will seek the development of housing construction plans for the improvement of the quality of life of citizens.

In this task, it receives support from the Oportunidades program, the National Housing Development Commission (CONAFOVI) and the National Institute for Social Development (INDESOL); Including the Commission for the Regularization of Land Tenure (CORETT), the National Fund for Popular Housing (FONHAPO), the National Fund for the Promotion of Handicrafts (FONART), and other state institutions.

According to article 39 of the Official Gazette of the Federation (Effective April 2, 2014) and the General Law of Social Development, SEDESOL will be the agency responsible for regulating the Fund for Contributions to Social Infrastructure by its initials FAIS, According to Branch 33 of the Ministry of Finance and Public Credit (SHCP), which includes as a budgetary mechanism created to distribute federal resources to states and municipalities, seeking to address the needs in terms of:

- Education
- Health
- Basic infrastructure
- Financial Strengthening and Public Safety
- Food and social assistance programs
- Educational infrastructure, giving attention to the demands of the government

== List of secretaries of welfare ==
Secretaries of Public Works (1959-1976)
- (1959–1964): Javier Barros Sierra
- (1964–1970): Gilberto Valenzuela
- (1970–1976): Luis Enrique Bracamontes

Secretary of Human Settlements and Public Works (1976-1982)

- (1976–1982): Pedro Ramírez Vázquez

Secretariat of Urban Development and Ecology (1982-1992)

- (1982–1985): Marcelo Javelly Girard
- (1985–1986): Guillermo Carrillo Arena
- (1986–1988): Manuel Camacho Solís
- (1988): Gabino Fraga
- (1988–1992): Patricio Chirinos Calero

Secretaries of Social Development (1992-2018)

- (1992–1993): Luis Donaldo Colosio
- (1993–1998): Carlos Rojas Gutiérrez
- (1998–1999): Esteban Moctezuma
- (1999–2000): Carlos Jarque
- (2000–2006): Josefina Vázquez Mota
- (2006): Ana Teresa Aranda
- (2006–2008): Beatriz Zavala Peniche
- (2008–2009): Ernesto Javier Cordero Arroyo
- (2009–2012): Heriberto Felix Guerra
- (2012–2015): Rosario Robles
- (2015–2016): José Antonio Meade Kuribreña
- (2016–2017): Luis Enrique Miranda

Secretaries of Welfare (2018-present)

- (2018): Eviel Pérez Magaña
- (2018–2020): Maria Luisa Albores
- (2020–2022): Javier May Rodríguez
- (2022–2026): Ariadna Montiel Reyes
- (2026-present): Leticia Ramírez Amaya
