= Diego Montiel =

Diego Montiel may refer to:

- Diego Montiel (footballer, born 1995), Swedish midfielder
- Diego Montiel (footballer, born 1996) (1996-2021), Argentine midfielder
