= José Córdova =

José Córdova may refer to:

- José María Córdova (1799–1829), Colombian general
- José Ángel Córdova (born 1953), Mexican politician
- José Córdova Hernández (born 1959), Mexican politician
