= 6th federal electoral district of Tabasco =

Federal electoral district of Mexico

Tabasco's 6th
- Electoral district of the Chamber of Deputies of Mexico

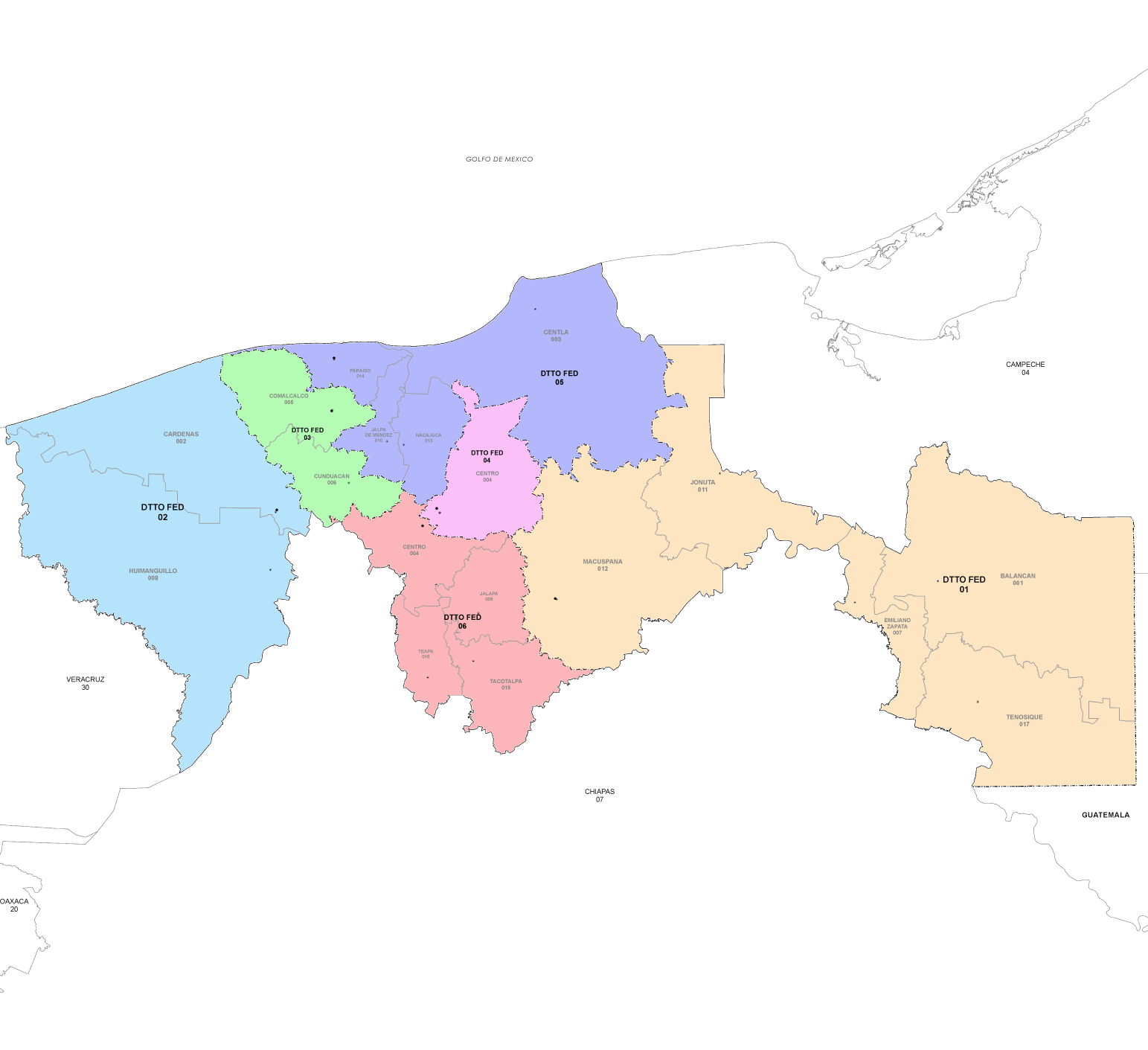
- 6th district

Incumbent
- Member: Tey Mollinedo Cano
- Party: ▌Morena
- Congress: 66th (2024–2027)

District
- State: Tabasco
- Head town: Ranchería Ixtacomitán, Centro
- Coordinates: 17°57′N 92°59′W
- Covers: Centro (part), Jalapa, Tacotalpa, Teapa
- PR region: Third
- Precincts: 159
- Population: 414,187 (2020 census)

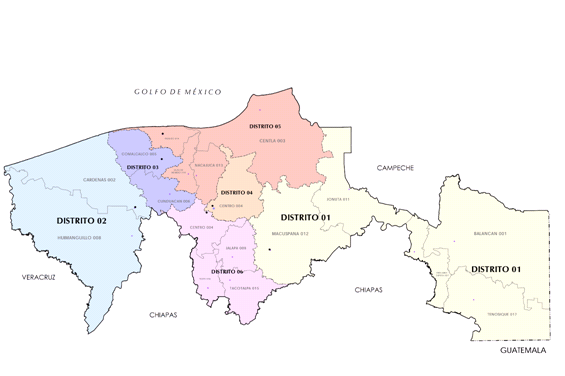
Tabasco's districts in 2017–2022

The 6th federal electoral district of Tabasco (Spanish: Distrito electoral federal 06 de Tabasco) is one of the 300 electoral districts into which Mexico is divided for elections to the federal Chamber of Deputies and one of six such districts in the state of Tabasco.

It elects one deputy to the lower house of Congress for each three-year legislative session by means of the first-past-the-post system. Votes cast in the district also count towards the calculation of proportional representation ("plurinominal") deputies elected from the third region.

Tabasco's 6th was created by the Federal Electoral Institute (IFE) in its 1996 redistricting process to accommodate shifting demographics. The new district elected its first deputy in the 1997 mid-terms.

The current member for the district, elected in the 2024 general election, is Tey Mollinedo Cano of the National Regeneration Movement (Morena).

== District territory ==
Under the 2023 districting plan adopted by the National Electoral Institute (INE), which is to be used for the 2024, 2027 and 2030 federal elections, Tabasco's 6th district is in the centre-south of Tabasco and covers 159 electoral precincts (secciones electorales) across four of the state's municipalities:

- Jalapa, Tacotalpa and Teapa in their entirety, and the south-western portion of Centro.

The head town (cabecera distrital), where results from individual polling stations are gathered together and tallied, is the Ranchería Ixtacomitán neighbourhood on the outskirts of the state capital, Villahermosa. The district reported a population of 414,187 in the 2020 census.

== Previous districting schemes ==
Evolution of electoral district numbers
| | 1974 | 1978 | 1996 | 2005 | 2017 | 2023 |
|---|---|---|---|---|---|---|
| Tabasco | 3 | 5 | 6 | 6 | 6 | 6 |
| Chamber of Deputies | 196 | 300 | | | | |

2017–2022

From 2017 to 2022, as in the 2023 plan, the district covered the municipalities of Jalapa, Tacotalpa and Teapa, together with a south-western portion of Centro. The head town was at Villahermosa.

2005–2017

Under the 2005 plan, the district had the same composition as in the 2017 and 2023 schemes.

1996–2005

Tabasco's 6th was created in the 1996 redistricting process. The new district covered the south-western portion of Centro, with its head town at Villahermosa.

== Deputies returned to Congress ==
(Mexico) National parties
- Current
- PAN
- PRI
- PT
- PVEM
- MC
- Morena
- PAZ
- Somos
- Defunct or local only
- PLM
- PNR
- PRM
- PNM
- PP
- PPS
- PARM
- PFCRN
- CON
- PANAL
- PSD
- PES
- PES
- PRD

Tabasco's 6th district
| Election | Deputy | Party | Term | Legislature |
|---|---|---|---|---|
| 1997 | Arturo Núñez Jiménez | Institutional Revolutionary Party | 1997–2000 | 57th Congress |
| 2000 | Jesús Adelfo Taracena Martínez | Institutional Revolutionary Party | 2000–2003 | 58th Congress |
| 2003 | Amalin Yabur Elías | Institutional Revolutionary Party | 2003–2006 | 59th Congress |
| 2006 | Mónica Fernández Balboa | Party of the Democratic Revolution | 2006–2009 | 60th Congress |
| 2009 | José del Pilar Córdova Hernández | Institutional Revolutionary Party | 2009–2012 | 61st Congress |
| 2012 | Antonio Sansores Sastré | Party of the Democratic Revolution | 2012–2015 | 62nd Congress |
| 2015 | José del Pilar Córdova Hernández | Institutional Revolutionary Party | 2015–2018 | 63rd Congress |
| 2018 | Ricardo de la Peña Marshall | Social Encounter Party | 2018–2021 | 64th Congress |
| 2021 | Mario Rafael Llergo Latournerie | National Regeneration Movement | 2021–2024 | 65th Congress |
| 2024 | Tey Mollinedo Cano | National Regeneration Movement | 2024–2027 | 66th Congress |

=== Results ===
The corresponding page on the Spanish-language Wikipedia contains results of the congressional elections since 2006.

== Presidential elections ==
Tabasco's 6th district
| Election | District won by | Party or coalition | % |
|---|---|---|---|
| 2018 | Andrés Manuel López Obrador | Juntos Haremos Historia | 80.2341 |
| 2024 | Claudia Sheinbaum Pardo | Sigamos Haciendo Historia | 81.5713 |
