= Antonio Sansores Sastré =

Mexican politician

- Born: January 7, 1964; Tenosique, Tabasco, Mexico
- Died: August 18, 2020 (aged 56); Mexico City
- Education: Universidad Veracruzana, Jalapa, Veracruz
- Occupation: Politician
- Title: Medical Vascular Surgeon
- Political party: PRD

Antonio Sansores Sastré (7 January 1964 – 28 August 2020) is a Mexican politician affiliated with the Party of the Democratic Revolution (PRD). In the 2012 general election he was elected to the Chamber of Deputies to represent Tabasco's 6th district during the 62nd session of Congress.
