= Juan Francisco Cáceres =

Mexican politician

- Born: 26 October 1962 (age 63); Centro, Tabasco, Mexico
- Occupation: Deputy
- Political party: PAN

Juan Francisco Cáceres de la Fuente (born 26 October 1962) is a Mexican politician affiliated with the PAN. As of 2013 he served as Deputy of the LXII Legislature of the Mexican Congress representing Tabasco. He was his party's candidate for Governor of Tabasco in the 2006 gubernatorial election.
