= Tomás Garrido Canabal =

Mexican politician (1891–1943)

Tomás Garrido Canabal

Tomás Garrido Canabal (September 20, 1891 – April 8, 1943) was a Mexican revolutionary politician, soldier and atheist. Garrido Canabal served as governor of the state of Tabasco from 1920 to 1924 and from 1931 to 1934. He was noted for his anti-Catholicism; during his term, he led persecutions against the Church in his state, killing many priests and laymen and driving the remainder underground.

== Biography ==
Tomás Garrido Canabal was born in the hacienda of Playas de Catazajá, in the northernmost part of the Mexican state of Chiapas. During the Mexican Revolution, he was drawn into politics. He was named interim governor of Tabasco for a brief spell in 1919 (and then of the Yucatán in May and June 1920) until in December 1920 "Garrido again became provisional governor of Tabasco. From this point until August 1935 (except for a brief hiatus during the de la Huerta rebellion) he controlled the state." Garrido's rule, which marked the apogee of Mexican anti-clericalism, was supported by the Radical Socialist Party of Tabasco (PRST) of which he was the leader.

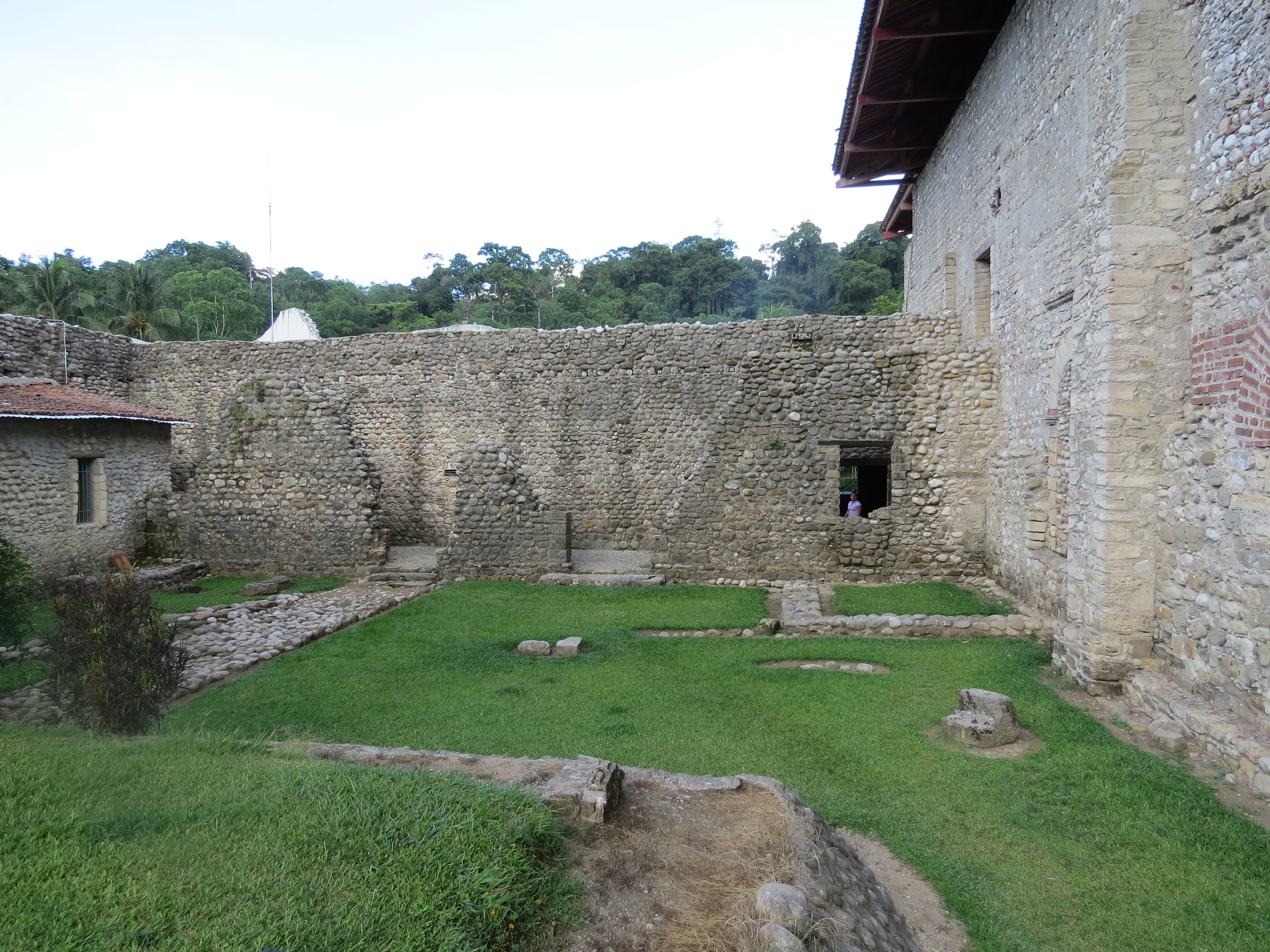
Ruins at the Convento de Oxolotán, bombed by order of Garrido Canabal

A character thought to be based on Canabal, in the novel The Power and the Glory, was called an "atheist and a puritan" by Peter Godman. Canabal was a fervent anticlericalist and anti-Catholic, who supported President Plutarco Elías Calles's war against the Cristeros, a rebellion opposed to the enforcement of anticlerical laws. He founded several organizations "that terrorized Roman Catholics", most notably the so-called "Camisas Rojas" or "Red Shirts", and as a result some have labeled him a "fascist", but he named one of his sons after Vladimir Lenin, a Marxist, and considered himself a Marxist Bolshevik. The anthem of his Redshirts was The Internationale. Some scholars have argued that his authoritarian policies were more akin to European right-wing dictatorships, though he wished to turn the traditionally conservative state of Tabasco into a socialist model and fought for socialist causes and Tabasco has been called a "socialist tyranny" by Martin C. Needler, Dean of the School of International Studies at the University of the Pacific in California. He also invited the First Congress of Socialist Students to meet in the state of Tabasco and created a form of socialist education which he termed "Rationalist".

Garrido Canabal's revolutionary fervor was reflected in the names of his children: Lenin and Zoila Libertad. He even had a farm with a bull named God, an ox and a hog named Pope, a cow named after Mary, and a donkey named Christ. In Tabasco, satirical plays were also organised, with for instance "the parading of a stud bull called 'the bishop' or an ass labeled 'the pope.'"

Roberto Hinojosa, the Bolivian revolutionary, described Garrido's Tabasco as "the Bethlehem of the Socialist dawn in America" and Garrido as an "academic and farmer, intellectual and rancher, a guide and soldier of socialism".

Garrido Canabal's administrative achievements included stimulating the social development of the state of Tabasco by means of agricultural and social policies and his support for the enfranchisement of women. In 1934, he introduced women's suffrage to Tabasco, making him the second governor to do so after Felipe Carrillo Puerto of the Yucatán twelve years earlier. Garrido Canabal's Tabasco was one of several states "vying with one another for the title 'Laboratory of the Revolution'." As Governor, he also issued rigid decrees against corsets and alcohol and outlawed tombstones.

When Lázaro Cárdenas was elected president in 1934, his first cabinet was hand-picked by his patron, Plutarco Elías Calles, the "Jefe Máximo" and power behind the presidency. Calles named fellow anticlerical Garrido Canabal as Secretary of Agriculture to Lázaro Cárdenas's cabinet. Garrido Canabal brought the Red Shirts to Mexico City. Soon after Cárdenas took office, he turned against Garrido Canabal. In 1935, after Garrido Canabal ordered his Red Shirts to kill Catholic activists in Mexico City seeking to return to Tabasco, Cárdenas forced Garrido Canabal to step down and into exile in Costa Rica. Dismissing Garrido Canabal was part of Cárdenas's political maneuvering against Calles, who had expected to continue to be the power behind the presidency. Politically, eliminating Garrido Canabal and Calles gained Cárdenas the grudging support of the Roman Catholic Church in Mexico. Garrido Canabal's paramilitary groups were subsequently disbanded. He was allowed to return to Mexico in 1941 and died two years later of cancer in Los Angeles, California.

== Literary portrayal ==
The lieutenant in Graham Greene's The Power and the Glory is based on Garrido Canabal, though his name is never mentioned. The novel's protagonist is a (also unnamed) "whisky priest", a theme often used in Garrido Canabal's antireligious propaganda.

He is also referenced under the name Salgado in Les couteaux, a novel by French writer Emmanuel Roblès released in 1956.

== Works cited ==
- Martínez Assad, Carlos (2020). El laboratorio de la Revolución. El Tabasco garridista [The Laboratory of the Revolution: Tabasco under Tomás Garrido Canabal]. Translated by Rugeley, Terry. Brill. ISBN 978-90-04-73716-7.
- Ridgeway, Stan (2001). "Monoculture, Monopoly, and the Mexican Revolution: Tomás Garrido Canabal and the Standard Fruit Company in Tabasco (1920–1935)". Mexican Studies. 12 (1): 143–169.
- Canudas, Enrique (1989). Trópico Rojo: Historia política y social de Tabasco los años garridistas 1919/1934. Vol. 1. Gobierno del Estado de Tabasco, Instituto de Cultura de Tabasco. ISBN 968-889-187-8.
- Pérez Bertruy, Ramona Isabel (1992). Tomas Garrido Canabal y la conformacion del poder revolucionario Tabascueño 1914-1921 (Tesis de licenciatura thesis). Universidad Nacional Autonoma de Mexico.
