= Enrique Priego Oropeza =

Mexican politician

Enrique Priego Oropeza (born 13 March 1947) is a Mexican politician from the Institutional Revolutionary Party (PRI) and a former governor of Tabasco. His appointment as governor happened after the Electoral Tribunal of the Federal Judiciary annulled the previous election for governor and reversed the majority of Manuel Andrade Díaz of the PRI, who had won the elections of October 15, 2000.

Born in Jalapa, Tabasco, he graduated from Universidad Juárez Autónoma de Tabasco with a law degree.

== Priego–López Conflict ==
The cancellation of the elections for governor took the Government by surprise, which forced the federal congress to hold a special session to name someone who had to take the reins from the state as Temporary Governor before the imminent exit of Roberto Madrazo as chief executive, who finished to his term on December 31, 2000.

Article 47 of the state constitution says the following:

In the case of absolute lack of the Governor, occurring in the first two years of his term, if the Congress is in sessions, it will be elevated immediately in Electoral College and with the attendance of at least two third of the total sum of its members, will name, by an absolute majority by secret ballot, an acting Governor.

The same Congress, will send within the five following days, to the one who is designated the acting Governor, the call for the election of Governor who must conclude the current period; having to decide the date of the announcement and the one that is intended to carry out elections, a period not less than three months nor more than six.

If Congress is not in session, the Standing Committee shall therefore name a provisional Governor to convene special sessions of Congress for appointing the interim Governor who will then issue the call for the election of Governor in the preceding paragraph.

When the absence of Governor occurs after the second year of his term, if Congress is in session they shall appoint a Substitute Governor to complete the period. If Congress is not in session, the Standing Committee shall appoint a provisional governor and Congress will convene a special meeting to be held in the Electoral College and make the appointment of Substitute Governor.

Based on this article, on December 31, 2000, the PRI parliamentary group of the 56th Legislature (which stopped the same day) appointed the unlicensed federal deputy, Enrique Priego Oropeza of Tabasco's 2nd district, as acting governor. This action was described as legislative rashness by the PRD.

The PRD contested the nomination, arguing that on December 31, 2000, there was no total lack of governor as Roberto Madrazo he was still in office and, in any case, that it should be the 57th Legislature, itself coming into office on January 1, 2001 (the same day as the proposed new governor), that appointed the acting fovernor.

Under this argument, legislators from the PRD, PAN, PT and two members of the PRI appointed by then General Secretary of the PRI, Adán Augusto López Hernández, as acting governor, thus creating an unprecedented post-election conflict in the state and the country had two governors in one office in a state.

After several negotiations and political wrangling, the conflicting parties came to an agreement and Enrique Priego Oropeza assumed the interim governorship and called for fresh elections on 5 August 2001.

== See also ==
- Governor of Tabasco

Preceded by Roberto Madrazo	Governor of Tabasco; 2001-2002	Succeeded by Manuel Andrade Díaz
