= Montiel (surname) =

Montiel is a surname of Spanish origin. It comes from the area of southern Spain known as Campo de Montiel and the town located within the area called Montiel, in the Spanish province of Ciudad Real. People with the last name "Montiel" most likely have ancestors who came from the area.

- Alejandro Montiel (born 1971), Mexican boxer
- Alejandro Montiel (born 1993), Argentine footballer
- Alex Montiel (born 1981), Mexican YouTuber
- Andrés Montiel (born 1975), Mexican stage and film actor
- Arturo Montiel (born 1943), Mexican politician; governor of the State of Mexico 1999–2005
- Diego Montiel (1996–2021), Argentine football player
- Dito Montiel (born 1965), American screenwriter, director, and musician
- Fernando Montiel (born 1979), Mexican boxer
- Gabriel Montiel (born 1989), Mexican YouTuber
- Gonzalo Montiel (born 1997), Argentine football player
- José Montiel (born 1988), Paraguayan football player
- José Esteban Montiel (born 1962), Spanish long-distance runner
- Juan Montiel (born 1965), Uruguayan boxer
- María José Montiel, Spanish operatic mezzo-soprano
- Rafael Montiel (born 1981), Colombian road cyclist
- Sara Montiel (1928–2013), Spanish singer and actress
- Sergio Montiel (1927–2011), Argentine politician
