= Jesús Alí de la Torre =

Mexican politician

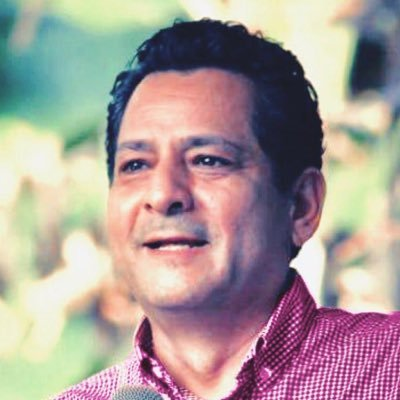
- Born: 12 April 1963 (age 63); Villahermosa, Tabasco, Mexico
- Occupation: Politician
- Political party: Independent (formerly PRI)

Jesús Alí de la Torre (born 12 April 1963) is a Mexican politician, formerly of the Institutional Revolutionary Party. From 2000 to 2003, he served as Deputy of the LVIII Legislature of the Mexican Congress representing Tabasco, and he was the mayor of Centro Municipality, containing the state capital of Villahermosa, from January 2010 to December 2011.

Alí mounted two failed bids to become Governor of Tabasco. In 2012, he ran as the PRI candidate for governor, finishing in second place; it was the first gubernatorial loss for the PRI in Tabasco in the modern era. He left the PRI in 2016, stating the decision was personal in nature, and ran as an independent candidate in 2018, receiving 1.98 percent of the vote.
