= Arturo Núñez Jiménez =

Mexican politician, Governor of Tabasco

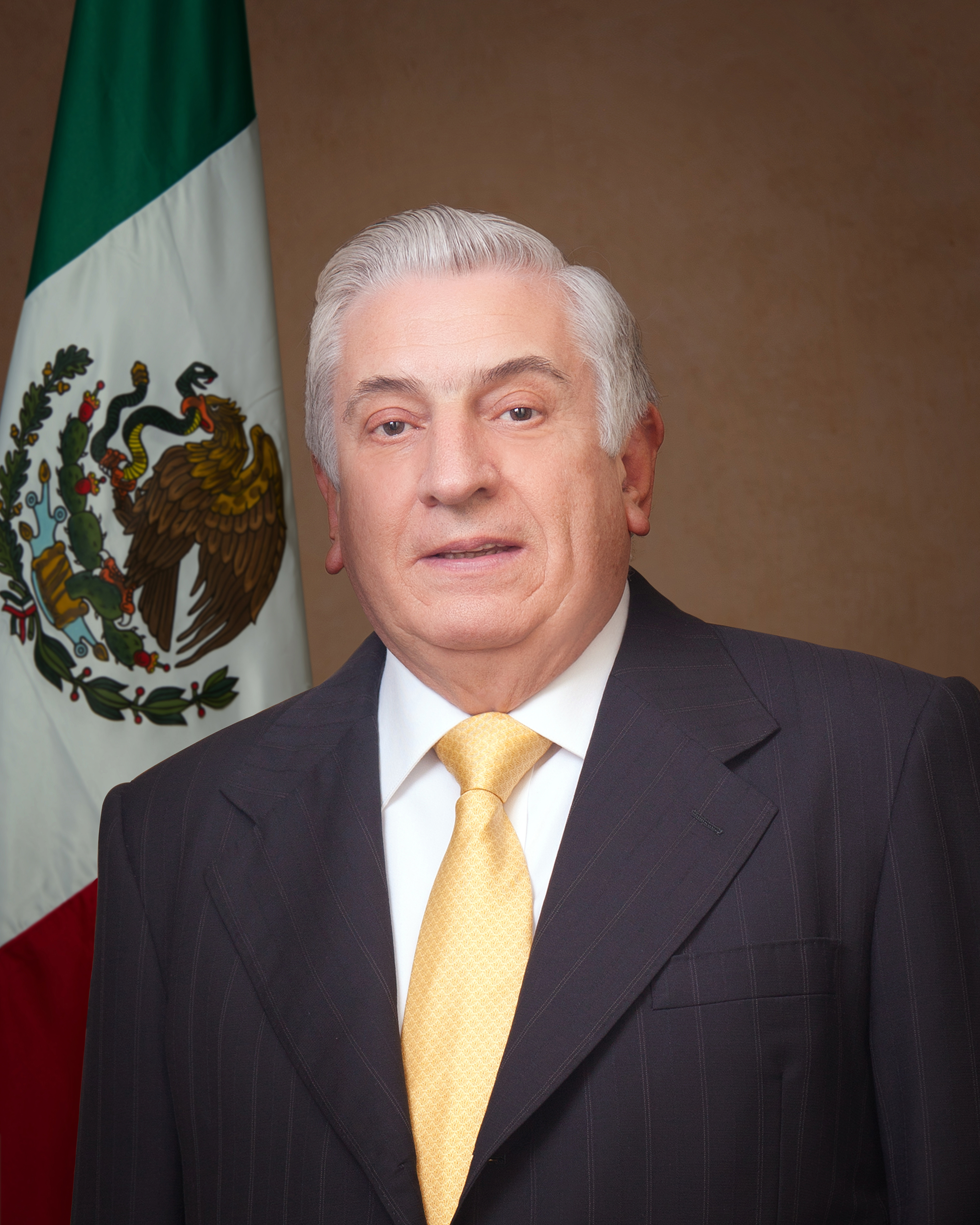

Governor of Tabasco
- In office 1 January 2013 – 31 December 2018
- Preceded by: Andrés Granier Melo
- Succeeded by: Adán Augusto López Hernández

President of the National Conference of Governors
- In office 13 December 2017 – 22 May 2018
- Preceded by: Miguel Angel Mancera
- Succeeded by: Manuel Velasco Coello

Personal details
- Born: 23 January 1948 (age 78) Villahermosa, Tabasco, Mexico
- Party: PRD (2005–present)
- Other political affiliations: PRI (pre-2005)
- Spouse: Martha Lilia López Aguilera
- Profession: Economist

Arturo Núñez Jiménez (born 23 January 1948) is a Mexican politician affiliated with the Party of the Democratic Revolution (PRD) who formerly belonged to with the Institutional Revolutionary Party (PRI). He served as governor of Tabasco from 2013 to 2018.

In January 1993 he was appointed to the Direction of the Federal Electoral Institute, where he was in charge of the elections of that year.

He also served in the Chamber of Deputies during the 57th Congress representing Tabasco's 6th district, where he was Coordinator of the PRI Legislative Group, and between 1998 and 1999 he was the President of the Chamber of Deputies.

In 2005 he resigned his PRI membership and announced his candidature for the Senate now with the PRD. In September 2006 he took office as senator for the 60th and part of the 61st sessions of Congress.

In December 2011 he won the nomination for the governorship of Tabasco by the Progressive Movement Coalition, composed of the PRD, the Convergence and the Labor Party. He subsequently won the election on 1 July 2012 and became the first non-PRI governor of Tabasco in 83 years.

Political offices
Preceded by Andrés Granier Melo	Governor of Tabasco; 2013–2018	Succeeded by Adán Augusto López Hernández
