= Leticia Ramírez Amaya =

Mexican Secretary of Education (b. 1961)

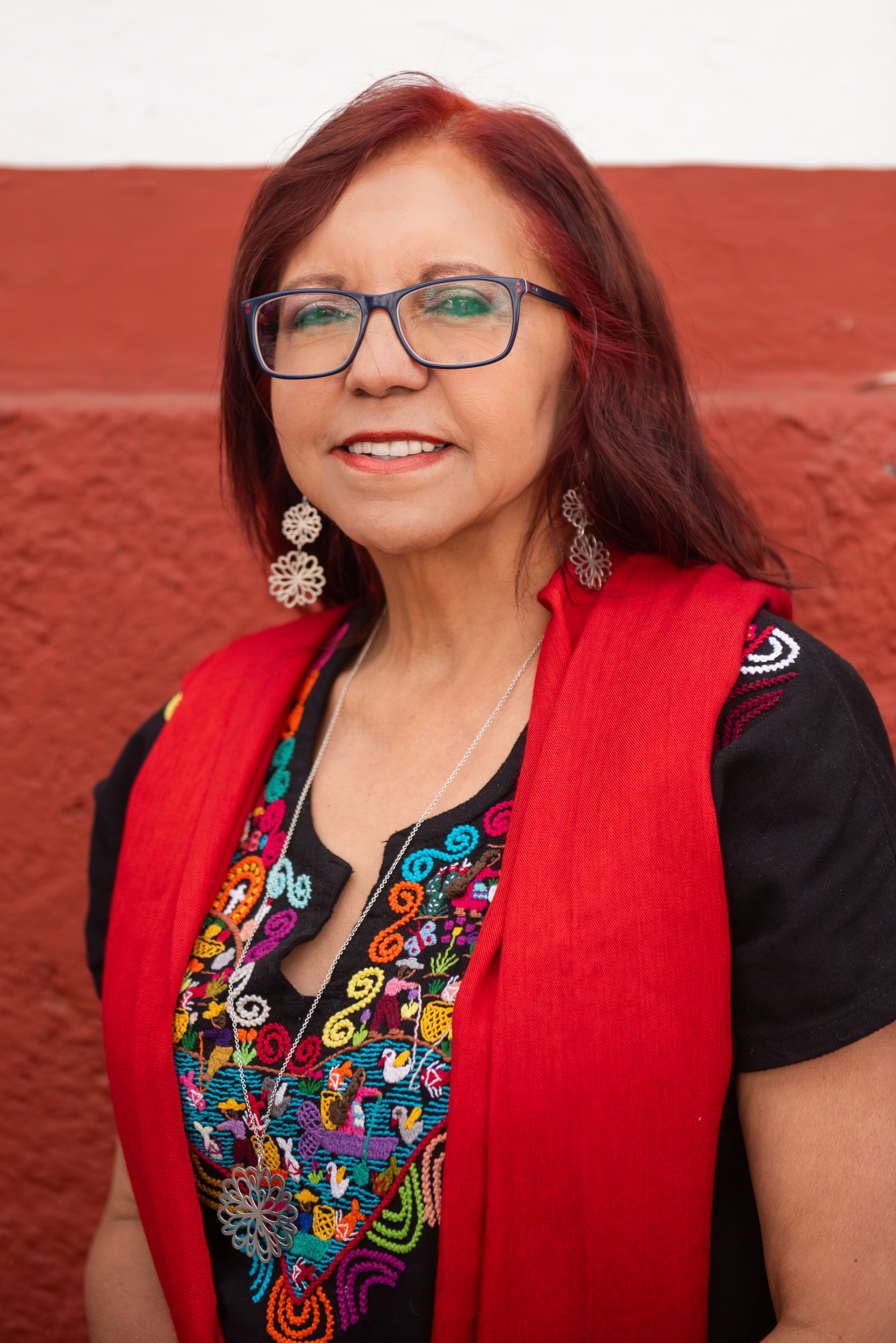
- Ramírez in 2024

Secretary of Welfare
- Incumbent
- Assumed office 29 April 2026
- President: Claudia Sheinbaum
- Preceded by: Ariadna Montiel Reyes

Secretary of Public Education
- In office 1 September 2022 – 30 September 2024
- President: Andrés Manuel López Obrador
- Preceded by: Delfina Gómez Álvarez
- Succeeded by: Mario Delgado Carrillo

Personal details
- Born: March 25, 1961 (age 65) Benito Juárez, Mexico City, Mexico
- Party: National Regenerational Movement

Leticia Ramírez Amaya (born 25 March 1961) is a Mexican professor, labor leader, and Morena politician. From 1 September 2022 to 30 September 2024, she served as the Secretary of Public Education, since April 29 2026, she serves as the current Secretary of Welfare after Ariadna Montiel Reyes resigned from her position on April 28 2026.

== Career ==
She is a professor of primary education at the Benemérita Escuela Nacional de Maestros, a position she obtained in 1984, having led a group for 12 years in schools west of Mexico City. She took incomplete anthropological studies at the Escuela Nacional de Antropología e Historia (ENAH) and Alta Dirección Pública. She participated in leftist social movements like the Movimiento Urbano Popular México and the Organización de Izquierda Revolucionaria Línea de Masas.

She participated in 9th Section of the 1989 magisterial movement, the objective of which was democratization of the primary syndicate of teachers, the Sindicato Nacional de Trabajadores de la Educación (SNTE); leading to the downfall of leader Carlos Jonguitud Barrios and the establishment of the Coordinadora Nacional de Trabajadores de la Educación (CNTE), as articulated by sections like the 9th. She stopped her syndicalist activity in 1992.

She was responsible for Citizen Services from 2000 to 2012 in the Government of Mexico City. Afterward from 2012 to 2018 she advised the Secretariat of the Environment of Mexico City. From 2018 to 2022, she was Director of Citizen Services of the Presidency of the Republic.

On 15 August 2022, it was announced she was to succeed Delfina Gómez Álvarez as Secretary of Public Education, being inaugurated on 1 September.
