= José Córdova Hernández =

Mexican politician

- Born: 12 October 1959 (age 66); Paraíso, Tabasco, Mexico
- Occupation: Politician
- Political party: PRI

José del Pilar Córdova Hernández (born 12 October 1959) is a Mexican politician from the Institutional Revolutionary Party (PRI).

He served in the Congress of Tabasco from 2007 to 2009.

He was subsequently elected twice to the federal Chamber of Deputies for Tabasco's 6th district: in the 2009 mid-terms (61st Congress, 2009–2012), and in the 2015 mid-terms (63rd Congress, 2015–2018).
