= Manuel Andrade Díaz =

Mexican politician (born 1965)

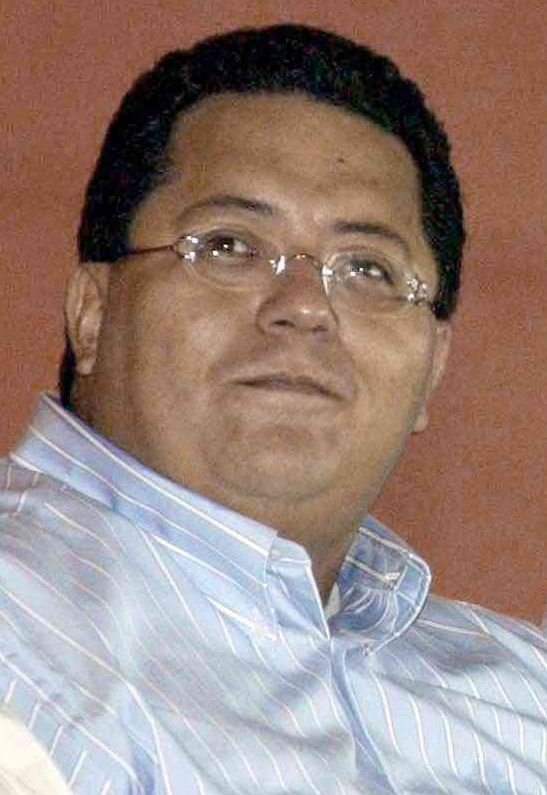
Manuel Andrade Díaz

Manuel Andrade Díaz (born 1965 in Villahermosa, Tabasco) is a Mexican politician affiliated with the Institutional Revolutionary Party PRI and former Governor of Tabasco. He holds a law degree from the University Juárez Autónoma of Tabasco and qualified in Electoral Law and Parliamentary Law.

== Career ==
Andrade Díaz was elected as Secretary General of the National Movement of Revolutionary Youth in the municipality of Centro, Tabasco, as well as Interim Secretary General of Popular Youth, and between 1989 and 1992, he was State President of the Revolutionary Youth Front (FJR). In this role he participated in the writing of the FJR Statutes, within the framework of the organisation's National Assembly.

He served as secretary general of the PRI Municipal Committee in Centro municipality; state co-ordinator of the PRI Electoral Program of Squares of First Priority of the CDE, in 1991; delegate of the CDE in Comalcalco, Cárdenas, Teapa and Cunduacán; and President of the PRI's Committee for the Promotion and Defence of Human Rights, from 1993 to 1994. That year he was named Coordinating State of the Legal Defense program of vote for the electoral process, and nominated Roberto Madrazo Pintado as candidate for governor.

During Pintado's campaign, Andrade was named secretary of Electoral Action, in which position he designed the strategy that resulted in victory for the PRI. This victory led him to become the PRI's representative to the state and municipal electoral bodies, in the federal and local inquiries of 1988, 1991 and 1994.

From 1996 to 1998, he was state leader of the PRI in Tabasco. While in this position he organised a concerted political and electoral campaign and managed to recover the four mayoralties that had been lost to the opposition three years before.

In the federal and local elections of 1997, under Andrade's leadership, the PRI gained all federal delegations, municipal presidencies and local delegations in the state. He has been a member of the National Political Council of the PRI since 1996.

Alongside his party activities, Andrade Diaz became assistant director in the Direction of Government, Private secretary to the Secretary of Education, Culture and Recreation, and auxiliary secretary to the State Secretary of Interior.

Twice he became a Parliamentary Deputy, in the 54th and 56th legislatures, in the latter serving as president of the Grand Commission of the H. Congress of the State.

He was also Undersecretary for Political Development of the Interior Secretariat. He coordinated Madrazo's campaign in the internal election of the candidate for the Presidency of the Republic in 1999.

In 2000, Manuel Andrade Diaz was selected as the PRI candidate for Governor of Tabasco.

== As governor ==
=== Disputed first election ===
After being selected as a candidate for governor, Andrade was leading in the polls but facing opposition from Party of the Democratic Revolution PRD candidate César Raúl Ojeda, and José Antonio de la Vega of the National Action Party PAN, as well as eight other contenders.

On 15 October 2000, on the night of the election, both Andrade and Ojeda claimed victory in the election. However, the Electoral Institute reported that Manuel Andrade had received 44.05% of the votes, while César Raúl Ojeda had received 43.27% of the votes, and de la Vega 8.39%. The PRD and Ojeda decided to go to the Federal Electoral Tribunal to dispute the election results.

On 29 December 2000, two days before Manuel Andrade took office as governor, the Federal Electoral Tribunal, with four votes in favor and two against, annulled the election results and Andrade's victory, an unprecedented move in Mexico.

The Tribunal found that "the government of the state of Tabasco was not neutral in the gubernatorial election, which implies an effect on the freedom of the possible suffrage".

In the absence of a governor-elect, the congress of the state appointed Enrique Priego Oropeza as acting governor, who would have to remain in the position for up to 18 months, and call new elections for governor.

=== Dispute over Acting Governor ===
The annulment of the election results took the government by surprise and Congress held a session in order to take over the election of a temporary governor from the state before the departure of chief executive Madrazo, who finished his term on December 31, 2000.

Article 47 of the state constitution says that:

In the case of an absolute lack of governor, happened in both first years of the respective period, if the Congress is in session, it will be elevated immediately in Electoral School and concurring at least the two third parts of the total number of his members, will name, in a secret ballot and by an absolute majority of votes, to a temporary Governor.

The same Congress, will send within the five following days to the one of the designation of temporary Governor, the call for the election of Governor who must conclude the respective period; having to mediate between the date of the call and the one that is indicated to carry out elections, greater a nonsmaller term of three months nor of six.

If the Congress is not in session, the Permanent Commission will name, of course, to a provisional Governor and will summon to extraordinary sessions the Congress so that this one designates to the temporary Governor and sends the call for the election of governor in the terms of the previous paragraph.

When the lack of Governor happened after the second year of the respective period, if the Congress were in sessions will designate to the Governing Substitute that will have to conclude the period. If the Congress will not be reunited, the Permanent Commission will name a Governor provisional and will summon the Congress to Extraordinary Sessions so that it is elevated in Electoral School and it makes the designation of substitute Governor.

Based on this article, on 31 December 2000, the parliamentary group of the PRI of the 56th legislature, which ended that day, designated Enrique Priego Oropeza as Acting Governor and sent to the federal deputy without license. This action was described by the PRD as a "legislative dawn raid".

The PRD opposed the appointment, arguing that there was no absolute lack of governor on 31 December, because Madrazo was still performing his obligatory functions, and that it should be the 57th legislature to designate the Acting Governor upon assuming its functions on 1 January 2001.

With this argument, the legislators of PRD, PAN, PT and two of the PRI designated the Secretary General of the PRI, Adán Augusto López, as acting governor, resolving the post-election dispute despite precedents in the state and the country—there were two governors in functions in a state. After political negotiations, the parties agreed and Enrique Priego Oropeza assumed the interim position and called new elections for 5 August 2001.

=== Second election ===
Andrade was again selected as candidate for governor, to face César Raúl Ojeda, also reselected by the PRD to contest the governorship. The PAN selected Lucio Lastra to fight the election, and also running was Blanca Guerrero of the Social Alliance Party. On election day, Manuel Andrade again prevailed with 50.67% of the votes, compared to 45.95% for Ojeda Zubieta, who this time accepted defeat without complaint.

Manuel Andrade was sworn in as Governor of Tabasco on 1 January 2002, in the presence of the President of Mexico, Vicente Fox, and the absence of the PRD and PAN state legislators. Also notable for their absence were PRI governors, with the exception of Tomás Yarrington, Governor of Tamaulipas.

== See also ==
- List of Mexican state governors
- Governor of Tabasco

Preceded by Enrique Priego Oropeza	Governor of Tabasco; 2002-2006	Succeeded by Andrés Rafael Granier Melo
