= Javier May =

Mexican politician (born 1966)

Governor of Tabasco
- Incumbent
- Assumed office 1 October 2024
- Preceded by: Carlos Manuel Merino Campos

Personal details
- Born: Javier May Rodríguez; 5 May 1966 (age 60) Comalcalco, Tabasco, Mexico
- Party: Morena

Javier May Rodríguez (born 5 May 1966) is a Mexican politician affiliated with the National Regeneration Movement (Morena). He served as the General Director of the National Tourism Development Fund (Fonatur) in 2022–2023 and as the Secretary of Welfare in 2020–2022. He has also been elected to the Senate for Tabasco, to the state congress, and for two terms as the mayor of his home town of Comalcalco, Tabasco.

May contended for governor of Tabasco in the 2 June 2024 election, representing the Morena-led Sigamos Haciendo Historia coalition. He won over 80% of the popular vote and took the oath of office as governor on 30 September 2024.
