= Gerardo Priego Tapia =

Mexican economist and politician

- Born: 19 June 1965 (age 61); Villahermosa, Tabasco, Mexico
- Education: Monterrey Institute of Technology and Higher Education
- Occupations: Economist and politician
- Political party: PAN

Gerardo Priego Tapia (born 19 June 1965, Villahermosa, Tabasco) is a Mexican economist and politician from the National Action Party. From 2006 to 2009, he served as the Deputy of the LX Legislature of the Mexican Congress, and representedTabasco.
