= Pascual Bellizzia Rosique =

Mexican politician

- Born: 27 January 1964 (age 62); Veracruz, Mexico
- Occupation: Politician
- Political party: PVEM

Pascual Bellizzia Rosique (born 27 January 1964) is a Mexican politician from the Ecologist Green Party of Mexico (Spanish: Partido Verde Ecologista de México. From 2008 to 2009, he was a deputy in the LX Legislature of the Mexican Congress representing Veracruz.
