= Joaquín Ruiz (Mexican politician) =

Mexican politician

67th Governor of Tabasco (interim)
- In office 10 May 1917 – 5 July 1918
- Preceded by: Luis Felipe Domínguez Suárez
- Succeeded by: Luis M. Hernández

Secretary of Government of Tabasco
- In office 16 September 1916 – 10 May 1917
- Governor: Luis Felipe Domínguez Suárez

Joaquín Ruiz Jiménez was a Mexican politician who served as the 67th Governor of Tabasco, serving in an interim capacity.

In 1916, after pressure from generals and civilians in Tabasco, Mexican President Venustiano Carranza directed these activists to nominate their own leader. Luis Felipe Domínguez Suárez was subsequently named governor, with Ruiz serving as the Secretary of Government for Tabasco. Domínguez resigned from the governorship to take control of a local military zone.

During his governorship, Ruiz sought to reform the agricultural policies that Domínguez instituted. Ruiz resigned on 4 July 1918, being officially replaced on 5 July by Luis M. Hernández, who instituted new elections for governor and local representatives.
