= Eduardo González Arévalo =

Mexican general (1832–1867)

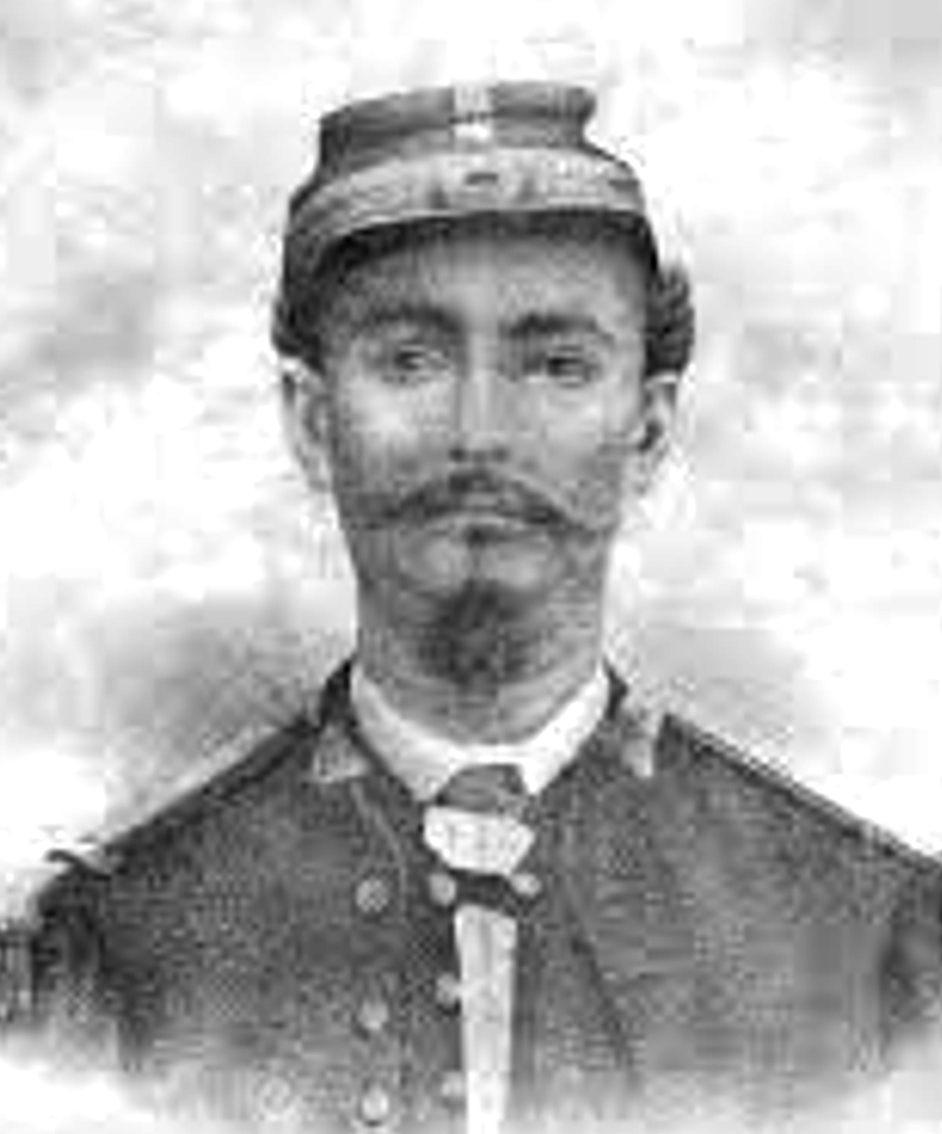

Governor of Tabasco
- In office June 18, 1863 – January 20, 1864
- Monarch: Maximiliano I
- Preceded by: Victorio Victorino Dueñas
- Succeeded by: Manuel Díaz de la Vega

Personal details
- Born: January 5, 1832 Granada, Province of Granada, Spain
- Died: May 6, 1867 (aged 35) Mérida, Yucatán, Mexico

Military service
- Allegiance: Mexican Empire
- Branch: Imperial Mexican Army
- Years of service: 1863 – 1867
- Rank: General
- Battles/wars: Second French intervention in Mexico: French intervention in Tabasco; Capture of Jonuta

Eduardo González Arévalo (January 5, 1832 – May 6, 1867) was a Spanish-born Imperial Mexican General during the Second French intervention in Mexico. He was known for being the Imperial Governor of Tabasco from June 18, 1863 to January 20, 1864 as well as being a major participant of the French intervention in Tabasco.

== Invasion of Tabasco ==
Despite being born in Spain, González Arévalo set sail from the island of Carmen at the age of 24 aboard the warships La Corina and La Diana to subdue a rebellion at Palizada and capturing Jonuta. Once arriving at Palizada, the French troops led by Arévalo, received reinforcements and before the refusal of the Tabasco governor Victorio Victorino Dueñas to join the French and Imperial Mexicans, Arévalo began a siege on the town of Jonuta, thus initiating the invasion of Tabasco.

Once the invasion of Tabasco began, Arévalo ordered the seizure of the port of Frontera, Tabasco . Thus, on March 15, 1863, the French, supported by the warships Darien and El Conservador, took the port of Frontera, from where they began a naval blockade and began planning their advance to the capital of the state of San Juan Bautista.

On June 18, 1863, the French army under the command of Eduardo González Arévalo arrived at San Juan Bautista, initiating a heavy bombardment and landing with 150 men. Given this, the French and Imperial Mexican forces were able to occupy the state capital by making the Tabasqueño authorities flee as Gregorio Méndez Magaña and Andrés Sánchez Magallanes fled for Chontalpa while the state governor Victorio Victorino Dueñas and other authorities moved to the Sierra, making Tacotalpa the provisional capital of the state.

== Governorship ==
By June 19, 1863, the French and Imperial Mexican forces fully occupied San Juan Bautista and González Arévalo declared himself governor and military commander of Tabasco, a position he would hold until January 20, 1864, when he was dismissed. This conflicted with Dueñas' governorship however since he continued to govern from Tacotalpa.

Already in government, González Arévalo appointed a Government Council that would be in charge of establishing the new territorial division of the state. The council took possession on September 16, 1863, the same day that Arévalo was ratified by the Imperial Regency. The Council divided Tabasco into 4 districts: Centro, Chontalpa, Sierra and Pichucalco. Around that time, a group of militiamen from Chiapas invaded the district of Pichucalco which belonged to Tabasco at the time with the intention of annexing it to Chiapas, for which González Arévalo sent an army of 150 men, defeating the Chiapaneco forces.

Gonzáles Arévalo turned Tabasco into his fiefdom and dedicated himself to enriching himself as decreased profits, rape, murder, robbery, property seizures and requisitions of all kind continued. Due to the given circumstances, discontent among the populace began to grow as opposition was expected at any moment.

In order to have control of the state, González Arévalo appointed personnel from his army as plaza bosses in the state's municipalities. However, this did not prevent Colonel Andrés Sánchez Magallanes from taking up arms in San Antonio de Cárdenas on October 6, Colonel Gregorio Méndez Magaña in Comalcalco on October 8, and a few days later Lino Merino did the same in Tacotalpa and the brothers Gustavo and Rosario Bastar Sozaya in Teapa, forming the Liberal Army of Tabasco. In San Juan Bautista, Arévalo began to intimidate the city's population, forcing merchants to open their businesses, and threatening individuals and families he suspected of aiding the rebels.

Trying to calm the spirits of insubordination, González Arévalo met with the Constitutional Governor Victorio Victorino Dueñas. Both met next to the great ceiba in the town of Atasta, in order to reach an agreement on the fate of San Juan Bautista. However, they wouldn't reach an agreement as Governor Dueñas told him that the only agreement that could be reached is for the French to evacuate from the state.

== Defeat, disposition and death ==
Tabasco's liberal army captured Comalcalco, Jalpa de Méndez, Teapa, and Pichucalco and attacked Cunduacán, defeating Arévalo's army at the Battle of El Jahuactal on November 1. General González Arévalo entrenched his troops in San Juan Bautista and the Tabasqueño troops began the siege of the city on December 2, 1863. Given the lack of control and ungovernability that existed in the state, the Regency of the Empire decided to remove Eduardo González Arévalo as governor of Tabasco, appointing in his place General Manuel Díaz de la Vega who arrived in San Juan Bautista on January 20, 1864, managing to enter the city through the only access point controlled by the French through the Grijalva River. After his departure, Arévalo moved to Mexico City, where he continued to serve the Imperialist Government of Maximiliano I.

In 1865, Arévalo obtained Mexican nationality, and on June 16 of that year, from Sacluk, Guatemala, he launched a Manifesto to the State of Tabasco, in which he explained the reasons for his military conduct and the causes of his dismissal. General González Arévalo died in an armed confrontation, when he led the assault on the building of the imperial commissariat of Yucatán on May 6, 1867.

== Bibliography ==
- Arias Gómez, María Eugenia (1987). Dr. José María Luis Mora (ed.). Tabasco: Una historia compartida (1st ed.). Mexico City: Institute of Culture of Tabasco. ISBN 968-6173-11-0.
- Piña Gutiérrez, Jesús Antonio (2014). UNAM (ed.). Origen y Evolución del Poder Ejecutivo en Tabasco 1824-1914 (1st ed.). Mexico City: Instituto de Investigaciones Jurídicas de la UNAM. ISBN 978-607-02-5268-6.
- Torruco Saravia, Geney (1987). Editorial Usumacinta (ed.). Villahermosa Nuestra Ciudad (1st ed.). Villahermosa, Tabasco: H. Ayuntamiento Constitucional del Municipio de Centro. OCLC 253403147.
