= Constitution of Tabasco =

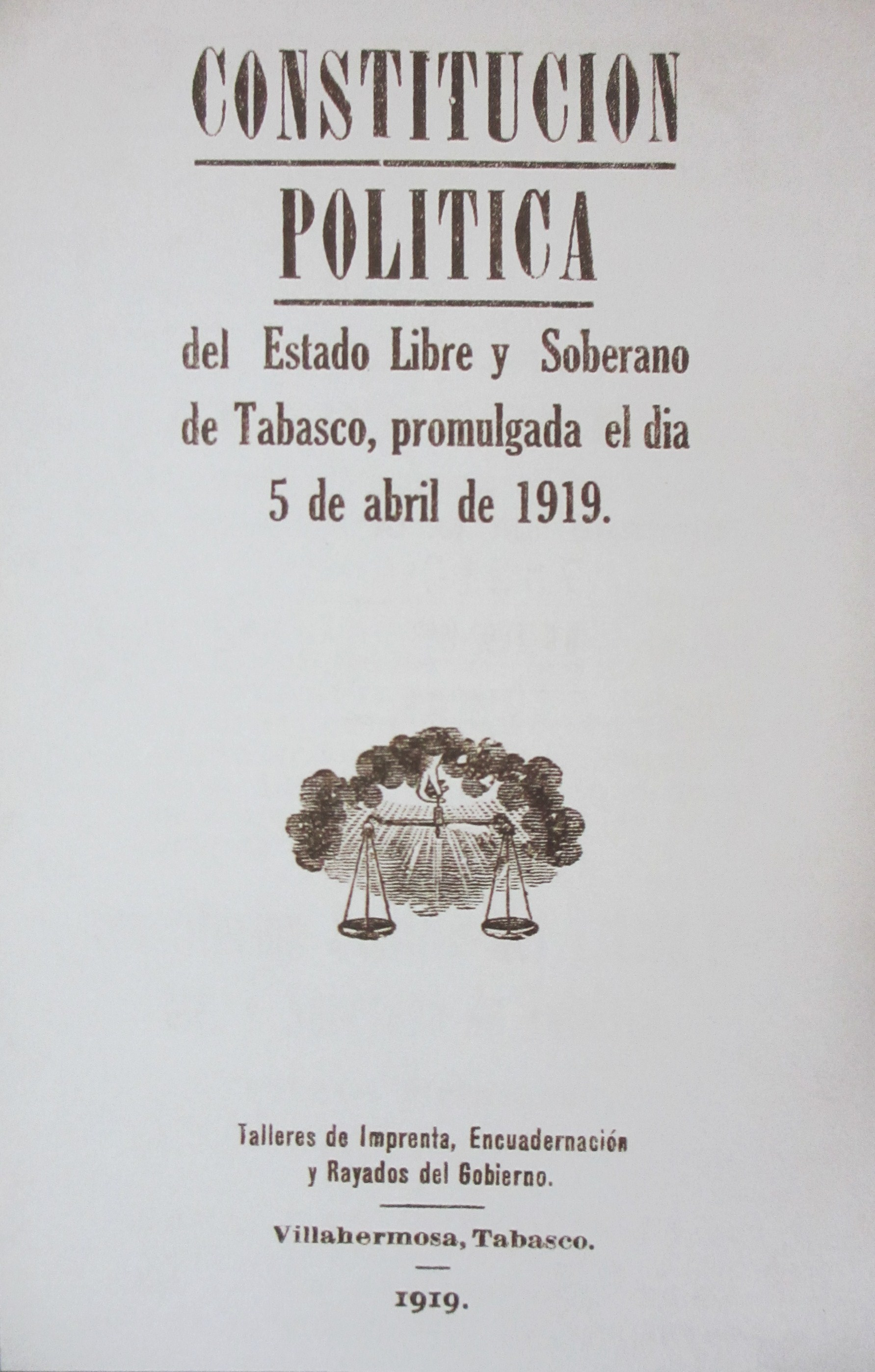
Cover of the Constitución Política del Estado Libre y Soberano de Tabasco

The Constitution of the State of Tabasco (Spanish: Constitución Política del Estado de Tabasco) is the document that describes the structure and function of the government of the State of Tabasco. The 1919 constitution, which took effect on 5 April 1919, is the current constitution of Tabasco.
