= Juan Cáceres (footballer, born 2002) =

Paraguayan footballer

Personal information
- Full name: Juan Ramón Cáceres López
- Date of birth: 30 March 2002 (age 24)
- Place of birth: Asunción, Paraguay
- Height: 1.74 m (5 ft 9 in)
- Position: Midfielder

Youth career
- Sol de América

Senior career*
Years	Team	Apps	(Gls)
2019–2024	Sol de América	22	(1)
2024	Deportivo Santaní	14	(0)
- * Club domestic league appearances and goals as of 12:44, 28 December 2024 (UTC)

Juan Ramón Cáceres López (born 30 March 2002) is a Paraguayan footballer who plays as a midfielder.

== Career ==
=== Sol de América ===
Cáceres was born and raised in Bañado Sur in Tacumbú, which is one of the barrios of Asunción in Paraguay. At the age of six, he joined Sol de Quinta Avenida soccer school and when he turned 12, he began playing for Club Sol de América.

Cáceres got his official debut for the club on 17 July 2019 against Club El Porvenir in the Copa Paraguay, where he scored a goal. His debut in the Paraguayan Primera División came on 1 September 2019, when he came on as a substitute for Ignacio Colombini against Sportivo San Lorenzo.

In the 2020 season, Cáceres played a total of five league games and scored one goal.

=== Deportivo Santaní ===
In July 2024, Cáceres joined Deportivo Santaní.
