= Andrés Granier Melo =

Mexican politician

Andrés Rafael Granier Melo
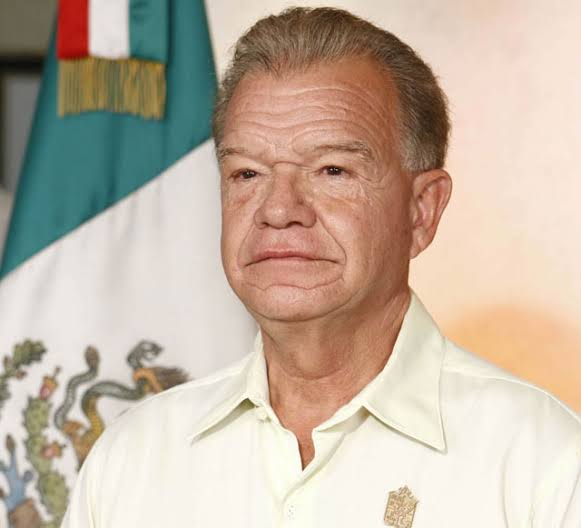

Governor of Tabasco
- In office January 1, 2007 – December 31, 2012
- Preceded by: Manuel Andrade Diaz
- Succeeded by: Arturo Núñez Jiménez

Personal details
- Born: 5 March 1948 (age 78) Villahermosa, Tabasco
- Party: PRI
- Occupation: Politician

Andrés Rafael Granier Melo (born March 5, 1948) is a former Mexican politician. A member of the Institutional Revolutionary Party (PRI), he served as Governor of Tabasco from 2007 to 2012.

== Early life and political career ==
Granier Melo was born on March 5, 1948, in Villahermosa, Tabasco. From 2000 to 2003, Andrés Granier served as municipal president of Centro, which has its municipal seat in Villahermosa, the capital city of the state.

== Governor of Tabasco ==
In 2006, he ran for the governorship of Tabasco, defeating Coalition for the Good of All candidate César Raúl Ojeda, a member of the Party of the Democratic Revolution (PRD). Ojeda questioned the results of the election before the Federal Electoral Tribunal. The Electoral Tribunal annulled the results of seven polling stations on December 27, 2006, but ratified the triumph of Granier, and declared that the Coalition for Good of All failed to show that there were any irregularities.

Granier took office in 2007 and completed his term as governor in December 2012.

== Arrest and imprisonment ==
On June 14, 2013, Granier was arrested on charges of corruption and embezzlement of public funds. He has denied wrongdoing. On June 26, 2013, he was taken to jail in Mexico City for tax fraud and money laundering for more than 1.9 million Mexican pesos.

On May 8, 2019, the former governor received a sentence of absolute freedom by a judge, after five years in prison and several months of house arrest.

== Personal life ==
He is married to Teresa Calles Santillan and they have twin daughters Mariana and Paulina Granier Calles, and a son, Fabian Granier Calles.

== See also ==
- 2006 Tabasco state election
- List of municipal presidents of Centro Municipality, Tabasco

Preceded by Manuel Andrade	Governor of Tabasco; 2007-2012	Succeeded by Arturo Núñez Jiménez
