= National Institute for Social Development =

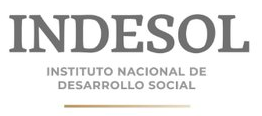
Official logo

The National Institute for Social Development (INDESOL or Instituto Nacional de Desarrollo Social) is the organization in charge of registering and monitoring nonprofit organizations in Mexico. There has been a steady increase in the number of charitable organizations registered since the 1990s. As of December 2017, INDESOL had registered a total of 38,363 charitable organizations.

In October 2021, The National Institute for Social Development (INDESOL) reported that the Federal Public Administration (FPA) has supported 14,000 CSOs with the disbursement of 1,611 million pesos to contribute to economic and social development actions.

== History ==
Following the passage of the Law for Promotion of Activities Carried out by Civil Society Organizations in February 2004, the regulations applied to registered CSOs and the federal registry for CSOs became active by November 2004.

In July 2015, journalists reported evidence in which the Proacceso Foundation and company Enova have received 1.7 billion pesos by the federal government and the State of Mexico in the span of six years, but have not been subject to government audits or evaluations that prove that the funds are being allocated for their stated purpose of improving education within primary schools.

In September 2017, following the Puebla Earthquake, CSOs made large contributions by providing humanitarian aid to the affected population. This prompted national recognition of the role of CSOs in Mexican civil society.

== Nonprofit organizations status ==
Mexico recognizes four types of nonprofit organizations: civil associations (AC), private assistance institutions (IAP), civil society (CS), and trusts. These types of organizations are eligible to receive benefits when registered under the Income Tax Law and/ or the Law for Promotion of Civil Society Organizations. To be eligible for registration, the nonprofit organization must follow proper administrative regulations, including using the designated accounting system, and submit annual reports to the Commission of Promotion of Activities for Civil Society Organizations that includes information on activities, achievements, and their income sources and expenditures. Governmental registration is voluntary, but registered nonprofit organizations are permitted to participate in the Federal Public Administration (FPA), consisting of the Presidency of the Republic of Mexico, the secretaries of state, and other governmental agencies, to confer with authorities, in order to promote their own organizational objectives and to help implement policy.

=== Definition ===
Created by the Civil Code for the Federal District (CCDF) in 1928, civil associations are composed of individuals united in a common purpose that does not include generating profit and falls under the boundaries of the law.

By contrast, private assistance institutions (IAPs) specifically provide social and humanitarian assistance. Like civil associations they must respect state law and operate with private means, while not seeking profit for their activities.

=== Political advocacy ===
The enactment of the Law for Promotion on Civil Society Organizations in 2004 provided the framework for nonprofit organizations to participate in development policy-making in Mexico. It encourages freedom of speech and assembly, so long as organizations do not disrupt the established law and order and do not contradict existing laws. CSOs are permitted to organize to engage in influencing the direction of proposed legislation. Beginning in December 2013, nonprofit organizations are permitted to undertake activities to influence legislation, on the condition that these activities are not in the interest of a particular donor. All political activities must be included in the organization’s transparency report.

=== Economic activities ===
AC organizations are permitted to engage in economic activities so long as they are not the main objective of the organization (CCDF Article 2670). The 2019 Presidential decree declares that a given organization is obligated to pay taxes if they allocate more than 10% of their income towards activities unrelated to their main purpose. (LISR Article 9). IAPs are allowed to pursue economic activities which are approved by The National Institute for Social Development (INDESOL), including purchasing property, making loans, and investing. Civil society is allowed to engage in economic activities, but are prohibited from engaging in speculative financial activity that could possibly result in a great loss in funds, such as trading stocks. Civil society organizations (CSOs) principally receive government support through the Social Joint Investment Program, known as the Programa de Coinversión Social (PCS) instituted by INDESOL. This program regulates the largest number of CSOs in the country.

It is reported by Mexican NGOs that resources are disproportionately distributed to organizations that are already closely partnered with the government, compared to organizations who operate independently. Independent organizations have been reported to be underfunded and subjected to heavy monitoring, resulting in a large amount of time and resources devoted to demonstrating their credibility to INDESOL. In comparison, well-funded, government-supported organizations are not always held to proper processes of verification.

== Legislation ==
In 2004, the Federal Law for the Promotion of Civil Society Organizations (LFOSC) passed following a decade of lobbying by the Mexican Center for Philanthropy, Convergence of Civic Organizations, the Mutual Support Forum, and the Fundación Miguel Miguel Aleman Foundation The Federal Law for the Promotion of Civil Society Organizations (LFOSC) created INDESOL, which is responsible for registering and assigning a Unique Registry Code (CLUNI) to each civil society organization, including ACs and IAPs. This Unique Registry Code is a prerequisite for government funding and helps increase transparency by organizations and the Registrar.

== Activities ==
=== Ensuring compliance ===
According to The Federal Law for the Promotion of Civil Society Organizations (LFOSC), under Article 30, not-for-profit organizations are subject to infractions if they engage in activities that do not contribute to public benefit, give funds to members, or fail to use their funds for activities for which the organization was created. INESOL is tasked with accepting reports from civil society organizations and ensuring this information is accurate, complete, and accessible. "Ley Federal de Fomento a las Actividades Realizadas pos organizaciones de la sociedad civil" (PDF). gobierno de méxico (in Spanish).</ref> Under The Federal Law for the Promotion of Civil Society Organizations (LFOSC), Article 31, INDESOL has the power to provide warnings and then to penalize infractions by fines and suspension from the registry for one year. If there are repeated infractions, or serious noncompliance, INDESOL can cancel the registration of the organization.

=== Information collection ===
The federal government of Mexico requires that all registered CSOs submit their articles of incorporation as well as statuties, legal representatives’ identification, registration certification for the Federal Taxpayers Registry (RFC), and address. Registered CSOs must also submit an annual report outlining their income sources, activities, accounting, and balance sheet, as well as the uses of their funding and outcomes. Reports and documents are submitted online at no cost through the CSO platform which is managed by INDESOL. In order for information to be submitted, the CSO’s legal representative must provide an updated electronic signature for every subsequent year that they are registered.

=== Information publishing ===
The National Institute for Social Development (INDESOL) maintains an online database where the required reports on civil society organizations (CSOs) are published, called the Federal Registry of Civil Society Organizations (CLUNI). The INDESOL Regulatory Framework makes all information reported by nonprofit organizations when they register accessible to create transparency and accountability to the general public.
