= Diego Montiel (footballer, born 1996) =

Argentine footballer (1996–2021)

Personal information
- Full name: Diego Armando Montiel
- Date of birth: 22 April 1996
- Place of birth: Santo Tomé, Argentina
- Date of death: 26 December 2021 (aged 25)
- Position: Midfielder

Youth career
- 2010–2014: Atlético de Rafaela

Senior career*
Years	Team	Apps	(Gls)
2014–2019	Atlético de Rafaela	29	(1)
2017–2018	→ Juventud Unida (loan)	11	(1)
2019	Bragado	9	(2)
- * Club domestic league appearances and goals

Diego Armando Montiel (22 April 1996 – 26 December 2021) was an Argentine professional footballer who played as a midfielder.

== Career ==
Montiel began his career with Argentine Primera División club Atlético de Rafaela, with four years spent with the youth team. His first taste of senior football came on 19 June 2013 when he was an unused substitute for a Copa Argentina tie with San Lorenzo. He made his debut for the club on 24 August 2014 in a league win at La Bombonera versus Boca Juniors. He scored his first goal for Rafaela four matches later in a home league defeat to River Plate. Rafaela were relegated in 2016–17, Montiel subsequently signed a new contract but was immediately loaned to fellow Primera B Nacional side Juventud Unida.

His first appearance for Juventud Unida came on 30 October 2017 versus Aldosivi, coming on for the final five minutes in a 2–0 defeat. Montiel's first Juventud goal came in a league match with Deportivo Morón on 20 November. Montiel terminated his contract with Rafaela in January 2019. Montiel subsequently had a stint in Torneo Regional Federal Amateur with Bragado in 2019, scoring twice across nine fixtures.

== Personal life and death ==
Montiel died from meningitis on 26 December 2021, at the age of 25.

== Career statistics ==
As of 10 July 2020

Appearances and goals by club, season and competition
Club	Season	League			National Cup		League Cup		Continental		Other		Total	
Club	Season	Division	Apps	Goals	Apps	Goals	Apps	Goals	Apps	Goals	Apps	Goals	Apps	Goals
Atlético de Rafaela	2012–13	Primera División	0	0	0	0	—		—		0	0	0	0
Atlético de Rafaela	2013–14	Primera División	0	0	0	0	—		—		0	0	0	0
Atlético de Rafaela	2014	Primera División	8	1	2	0	—		—		0	0	10	1
Atlético de Rafaela	2015	Primera División	0	0	0	0	—		—		0	0	0	0
Atlético de Rafaela	2016	Primera División	6	0	1	0	—		—		0	0	7	0
Atlético de Rafaela	2016–17	Primera División	15	0	1	0	—		—		0	0	16	0
Atlético de Rafaela	2017–18	Primera B Nacional	0	0	0	0	—		—		0	0	0	0
Atlético de Rafaela	2018–19	Primera B Nacional	0	0	0	0	—		—		0	0	0	0
Atlético de Rafaela	Total		29	1	4	0	—		—		0	0	33	1
Juventud Unida (loan)	2017–18	Primera B Nacional	11	1	0	0	—		—		0	0	11	1
Bragado	2019	Federal Amateur	9	2	0	0	—		—		0	0	9	2
Career total			49	4	4	0	—		—		0	0	53	4
