= Congress of Tabasco =

Legislature of Tabasco, Mexico

Honorable Congress of the Free and Sovereign State of Tabasco Honorable Congreso del Estado Libre y Soberano de Tabasco
- LXV Legislature

Type
- Type: Unicameral

History
- Founded: May 3, 1824

Leadership
- President: Marcos Rosendo Medina Filigrana, Morena
- Vice President: Orquídia López Yzquierdo, PRD
- 1st Secretary: Abby Cristhel Tejeda Vértiz, Morena
- 2nd Secretary: Gerald Washington Herrera Castellanos, MC

Structure
- Seats: 35
- Political groups: Morena (21) PRD (4) PT (3) PVEM (3) PRI (1) MC (3)
- Authority: Political Constitution of the Free and Sovereign State of Tabasco

Elections
- Voting system: First-past-the-post for 21 electoral district seats and Mixed-member proportional representation for 14 proportional representation seats
- Last election: 2 June 2024
- Next election: 2027

Meeting place
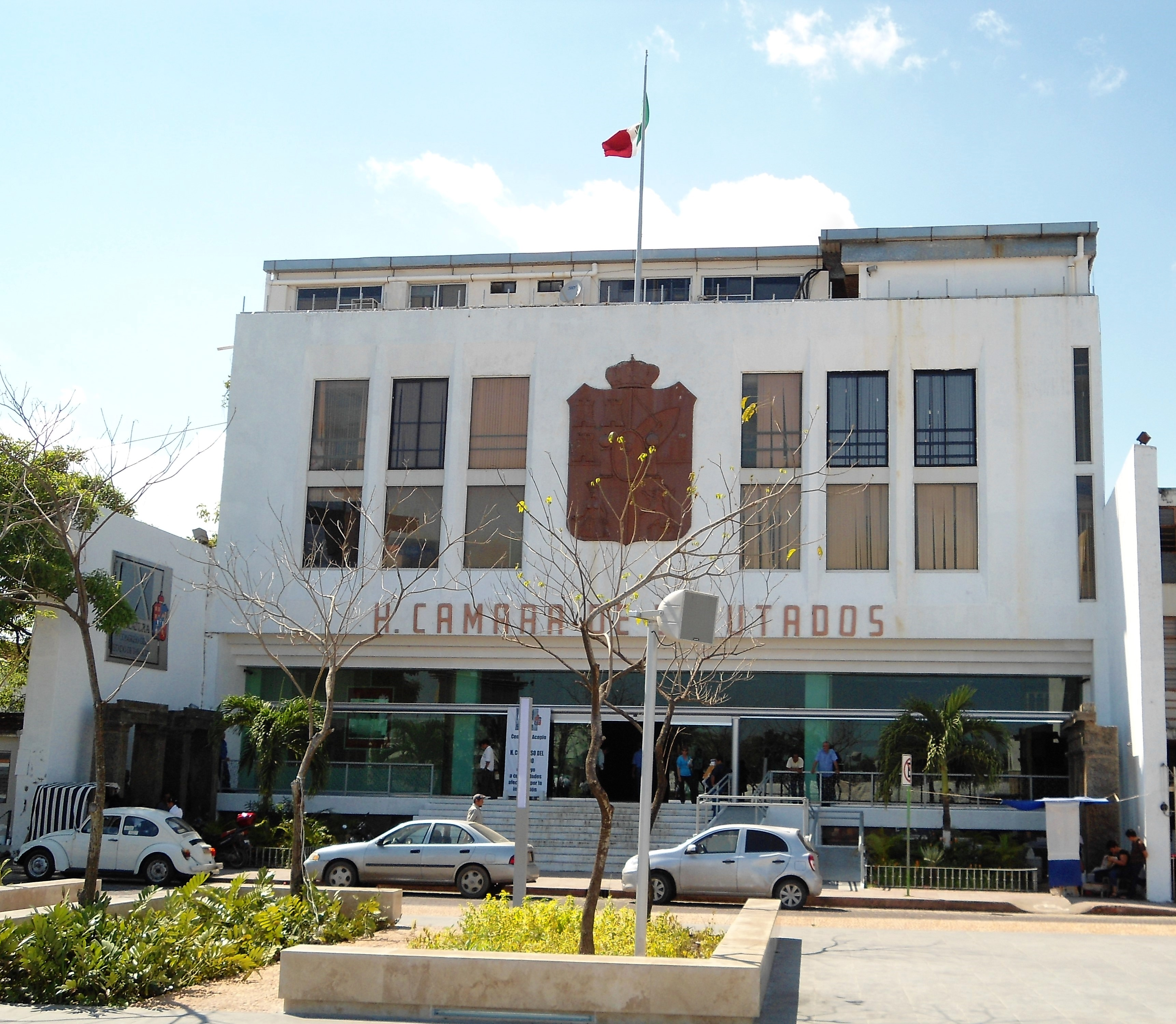
- Recinto del Poder Legislativo del Estado; Villahermosa, Tabasco, Mexico

Website
- H. Congreso del Estado Libre y Soberano de Tabasco

The Honorable Congress of the State of Tabasco (Spanish: Honorable Congreso del Estado de Tabasco) is the legislative branch of the government of the State of Tabasco. The Congress is the governmental deliberative body of Tabasco, which is equal to, and independent of, the executive. It is located in front of the Plaza de Armas, in the historic center of the city of Villahermosa, capital of the state.

The Congress is unicameral and consists of 35 deputies. 21 deputies are elected on a first-past-the-post basis, one for each district in which the entity is divided, while 14 are elected through a system of proportional representation. Deputies are elected to serve for a three-year term.

Since its installation the congress has been renewed 64 times, hence the previous session of the Congress of Tabasco (whose term lasted from 2021 to 2024) is known as the LXIV Legislature.

== Historical composition ==
This chart shows the historical composition of the Congress of Tabasco from the L Legislature to the present. It reflects the party affiliations of deputies at the time of their election and does not account for subsequent party switching.

Congress of Tabasco, 1979 to present

| PAN / PRI / PPS / PFCRN / PRD / PT / PVEM / MC / PANAL / MORENA | | | Total |
| L | 1979 | 4 / 17 | 21 |
| LI | 1982 | 4 / 17 | 21 |
| LII | 1985 | 4 / 17 | 21 |
| LIII | 1988 | 3 / 2 / 20 | 25 |
| LIV | 1991 | 2 / 5 / 20 / 2 | 29 |
| LV | 1994 | 5 / 22 / 2 | 29 |
| LVI | 1997 | 11 / 19 / 1 | 31 |
| LVII | 2000 | 1 / 12 / 16 / 2 | 31 |
| LVIII | 2003 | 18 / 13 / 1 / 3 | 35 |
| LIX | 2006 | 15 / 19 / 1 | 35 |
| LX | 2009 | 11 / 1 / 19 / 1 / 3 | 35 |
| LXI | 2012 | 5 / 17 / 2 / 1 / 7 / 1 / 2 | 35 |
| LXII | 2015 | 1 / 4 / 13 / 1 / 8 / 6 / 2 | 35 |
| LXIII | 2018 | 21 / 6 / 5 / 3 | 35 |
| LXIV | 2021 | 21 / 6 / 1 / 4 / 3 | 35 |
| LXV | 2024 | 3 / 21 / 4 / 3 / 1 / 3 | 35 |

== See also ==
- List of Mexican state congresses
