= Governor of Tabasco =

Chief executive of the state of Tabasco, Mexico

- Incumbent; Javier May Rodríguez since October 1, 2024
- Term length: Six years, non-renewable

List of governors of the Mexican state of Tabasco

== Political Chiefs of Tabasco (1821–1824) ==
Political Chief	Number	Period
Juan Nepomuceno Fernández Mantecón	1st	September 8, 1821 – April 22, 1822
Manuel María Leytón	2nd	September 7, 1821 – July 22, 1822
José Antonio Rincón	3rd	July 23, 1822 – July 1823
Pedro Pérez Medina	4th	May 3, 1824 – May 8, 1824

== Free and Sovereign State of Tabasco (1824–1836) ==
Governor	Number	Period	Political party
Agustín Ruíz de la Peña y Urrutia	1st	May 8, 1824 – December 6, 1824	Liberal Party
Pedro Pérez Medina	2nd	December 6, 1824 – July 31, 1825	
Agustín Ruíz de la Peña y Urrutia	2nd Term	August 1, 1825 – August 9, 1825	Liberal Party
Agustín Ruíz de la Peña y Urrutia	2nd Term	August 10, 1825 – August 3, 1827	Liberal Party
Marcelino Margalli	3rd	August 3, 1827 – December 1827	Conservative Party
Marcelino Margalli	3rd	December 1827 – September 17, 1828	Conservative Party
Pedro José García	4th	September 18, 1828 – November 7, 1828	
Santiago Duque de Estrada	5th	November 8, 1828 – August 10, 1829	Conservative Party
José Eusebio Magdonel	6th	August 11, 1829 – August 21, 1829	
Agustín Ruíz de la Peña y Urrutia	3rd Term	August 22, 1829 – December 1829	Liberal Party
Juan Dionisio Marcín	7th	December 1829 – August 13, 1830	
José Eusebio Magdonel	2nd Term	August 14, 1830 – August 18, 1830	
José Rovirosa Hernández	8th	August 18, 1830 – August 24, 1830	
José Rovirosa Hernández	8th	August 25, 1830 – September 26, 1832	
Manuel Buelta Rojo	9th	September 26, 1832 – March 23, 1834	
Juan de Dios Salazar	10th	March 23, 1834 – September 15, 1834	
Narciso Santa María	11th	September 16, 1834 – April 1836	
Eduardo Correa	12th	April 1836 – August 1836	
Santiago Duque de Estrada	2nd Term	August 1836 – September 1836	Conservative Party
Eduardo Correa	2nd Term	September 1836 – December 30, 1836	

== Department of Tabasco (1836–1846) ==
Governor	Number	Period	Political party
Eduardo Correa	1st	December 30, 1836 – August 9, 1837	
José Ignacio Gutiérrez (politician)	2nd	August 10, 1837 – November 16, 1840	
Juan Pablo de Anaya	3rd	November 17, 1840 – December 6, 1840	
Agustín Ruíz de la Peña y Urrutia	4th	December 6, 1840 – December 14, 1840	Liberal Party
Pedro Requena Estrada	5th	December 14, 1840 – January 3, 1841	
José Víctor Jiménez Falcón	6th	January 4, 1841 – February 1, 1841	
José Víctor Jiménez Falcón	6th	February 1, 1841 – March 4, 1841	
Justo Santa Anna	7th	March 4, 1841 – September 1841	
Francisco Díaz del Castillo	8th	September 1841 – February 8, 1842	
Agustín Ruíz de la Peña y Urrutia	2nd Term	February 9, 1842 – May 2, 1842	Liberal Party
José Higinio Ney	9th	May 2, 1842 – May 7, 1842	
José Julián Dueñas	10th	May 7, 1842 – June 11, 1842	
Francisco de Sentmanat y Zayas	11th	June 12, 1842 – July 11, 1843	
José Julián Dueñas	2nd Term	July 12, 1843 – August 31, 1843	
Pedro de Ampudia y Grimarest	12th	September 1, 1843 – May 1844	
Pedro de Ampudia y Grimarest	12th	May 1844 – June 30, 1844	
Narciso Santa María	13th	June 30, 1844 – September 5, 1844	
Pedro de Ampudia y Grimarest	2nd Term	September 5, 1844 – January 2, 1845	
Juan de Dios Salazar	14th	January 2, 1845 – March 1845	
José Víctor Jiménez Falcón	2nd Term	March 1845 – April 1845	
José Víctor Jiménez Falcón	2nd Term	April 1845 – June 14, 1845	
Juan de Dios Salazar	2nd Term	June 18, 1845 – September 9, 1845	
José Víctor Jiménez Falcón	3rd Term	August 20, 1845 – August 11, 1846	
Juan Bautista Traconis Rodríguez	15th	August 12, 1846 – August 22, 1846	

== Free and Sovereign State of Tabasco (1846–1865) ==
Governor	Number	Period	Political party
Juan Bautista Traconis Rodríguez	13th	August 22, 1846 – January 5, 1847	
Justo Santa Anna	14th	January 5, 1847 – February 13, 1847	
Justo Santa Anna	14th	February 13, 1847 – July 1847	
Gershom J. Van Brunt	15th	June 16, 1847 – June 26, 1847	
Abraham Bigelow	16th	June 26, 1847 – July 22, 1847	
José Julián Dueñas	17th	July 1847 – October 1847	
Justo Santa Anna	2nd Term	October 1847 – January 11, 1848	
José Encarnación Prats Medina	18th	January 11, 1848 – May 1848	
Justo Santa Anna	3rd Term	May 1848 – July 1848	
José Encarnación Prats Medina	2nd Term	July 1848 – October 1848	
Justo Santa Anna	4th Term	October 1848 – September 15, 1849	
José Julián Dueñas	2nd Term	September 16, 1849 – October 14, 1850	
Juan Manuel de Torres	19th	October 15, 1850 – December 4, 1850	
Gregorio Payró	20th	December 15, 1850 – May 1, 1851	
Joaquín Cirilo de Lanz	21st	May 1, 1851 – July 24, 1851	
Justo Santa Anna	5th Term	July 24, 1851 – November 9, 1851	
Justo Santa Anna	5th Term	November 9, 1851 – November 15, 1851	
Manuel Ponz y Ardil	22nd	November 15, 1851 – June 1852	
Justo Santa Anna	6th Term	June 1852 – August 9, 1852	
Manuel Ponz y Ardil	2nd Term	August 9, 1852 – September 23, 1852	
Joaquín Ferrer Martí	23rd	September 24, 1852 – June 24, 1853	
Manuel María Escobar y Rivera	24th	June 24, 1853 – August 29, 1855	
Benito Haro	25th	August 29, 1855 – May 1856	Liberal Party
José Víctor Jiménez Falcón	26th	May 21, 1856 – October 21, 1856	
Francisco de Velázquez	27th	October 21, 1856 – October 30, 1856	
José Justo Álvarez Valenzuela	28th	October 30, 1856 – June 24, 1857	
Victorio Victorino Dueñas	29th	June 24, 1857 – March 26, 1858	
Francisco de Velázquez	2nd Term	March 26, 1858 – March 29, 1858	
Simón Sarlat García	30th	March 29, 1858 – November 8, 1858	
Victorio Victorino Dueñas	2nd Term	November 8, 1858 – November 22, 1860	
José Encarnación Prats	3rd Term	November 22, 1860 – December 31, 1860	
Victorio Victorino Dueñas	3rd Term	January 1, 1861 – March 2, 1861	
Felipe J. Serra	31st	March 2, 1861 – December 2, 1861	
Victorio Victorino Dueñas	4th Term	December 2, 1861 – July 22, 1863	

== Imperial Department of Tabasco (1863–1867) ==
Prefect	Period
Eduardo González Arévalo	June 18, 1863 – January 20, 1864
Manuel Díaz de la Vega	January 20 – April 1, 1864

== Free and Sovereign State of Tabasco (from 1867) ==
Governor	Number	Period	Political party
Felipe J. Serra	2nd Term	July 22, 1863 – October 4, 1864	
Gregorio Méndez Magaña	32nd	October 4, 1864 – June 6, 1867	
Felipe J. Serra	3rd Term	June 6, 1867 – December 31, 1867	
Felipe J. Serra	3rd Term	January 1, 1868 – July 19, 1871	
Victorio Victorino Dueñas	5th Term	July 25, 1871 – July 30, 1871	
Ignacio Vado Ruz	33rd	July 31, 1871 – December 31, 1871	
Victorio Victorino Dueñas	6th Term	January 1, 1872 – December 1, 1873	
Simón Sarlat Nova	34th	December 1, 1873 – April 1, 1874	
Victorio Victorino Dueñas	7th Term	April 1, 1874 – December 31, 1875	
Santiago Cruces Zentella	35th	January 1, 1876 – May 8, 1876	
Pedro Carrillo	36th	May 8, 1876 – May 17, 1876	
Jesús Oliver Beristain	37th	May 17, 1876 – June 8, 1876	
Pedro Baranda	38th	June 8, 1876 – December 21, 1876	
Carlos Borda	39th	December 21, 1876 – December 24, 1876	
Juan Ramírez Calzada	40th	December 24, 1876 – May 31, 1877	
Simón Sarlat Nova	2nd Term	June 1, 1877 – September 30, 1879	
José Francisco de Lanz y Rolderat	41st	September 30, 1879 – November 30, 1879	
Simón Sarlat Nova	3rd Term	November 30, 1879 – May 24, 1880	
Manuel Foucher	42nd	May 25, 1880 – July 6, 1880	
Simón Sarlat Nova	4th Term	July 7, 1880 – December 31, 1880	
José Francisco de Lanz y Rolderat	2nd Term	January 1, 1880 – March 18, 1881	
Manuel Foucher	2nd Term	March 18, 1881 – November 2, 1882	
Wenceslao Briseño Bonilla	43rd	November 2, 1882 – December 10, 1882	
Lauro León Vázquez	44th	December 10, 1882 – December 11, 1882	
Francisco de Paula Aguilar	45th	December 11, 1882 – December 25, 1882	
Eusebio Castillo Zamudio	46th	December 25, 1882 – January 4, 1883	
Francisco de Paula Aguilar	2nd Term	January 4, 1883 – May 15, 1883	
Manuel Mestre Gorgoll	47th	May 15, 1883 – September 10, 1883	
Lauro León Vázquez	2nd Term	September 10, 1883 – October 1, 1883	
Manuel Mestre Gorgoll	2nd Term	October 1, 1883 – February 1, 1884	
Lauro León Vázquez	3rd Term	February 2, 1884 – July 24, 1884	
Manuel Mestre Gorgoll	3rd Term	July 25, 1884 – December 31, 1884	
Eusebio Castillo Zamudio	2nd Term	January 1, 1885 – March 11, 1886	
Policarpo Valenzuela	48th	March 12, 1886 – April 5, 1886	
Eusebio Castillo Zamudio	3rd Term	April 6, 1886 – March 21, 1887	
Policarpo Valenzuela	2nd Term	March 21, 1887 – March 23, 1887	
Abraham Bandala Patiño	49th	March 25, 1887 – September 30, 1887	Military
Simón Sarlat Nova	5th Term	October 1, 1887 – October 10, 1888	
Calixto Merino Jiménez	50th	October 10, 1888 – January 1, 1889	
Simón Sarlat Nova	6th Term	January 1, 1889 – March 20, 1890	
Calixto Merino Jiménez	2nd Term	March 20, 1890 – June 13, 1890	
Simón Sarlat Nova	7th Term	June 13, 1890 – December 31, 1890	
Simón Sarlat Nova	7th Term	January 1, 1891 – March 1, 1891	
Calixto Merino Jiménez	3rd Term	March 1, 1891 – September 11, 1891	
Simón Sarlat Nova	8th Term	September 11, 1891 – August 17, 1892	
Joaquín Zeferino Kerlegand	51st	August 17, 1892 – December 1, 1892	Military
Simón Sarlat Nova	9th Term	December 1, 1892 – March 12, 1894	
Abraham Bandala Patiño	2nd Term	March 12, 1894 – August 15, 1894	Military
Simón Sarlat Nova	10th Term	August 15, 1894 – December 31, 1894	
Abraham Bandala Patiño	3rd Term	January 1, 1895 – September 20, 1895	Military
Felipe J. Serra	4th Term	September 20, 1895 – October 27, 1895	
Abraham Bandala Patiño	4th Term	October 27, 1895 – November 11, 1896	Military
Felipe J. Serra	5th Term	November 11, 1896 – January 10, 1897	
Abraham Bandala Patiño	5th Term	January 10, 1897 – November 20, 1897	Military
Felipe J. Serra	6th Term	November 20, 1897 – January 12, 1898	
Abraham Bandala Patiño	6th Term	January 12, 1898 – December 31, 1898	Military
Abraham Bandala Patiño	6th Term	January 1, 1899 – November 10, 1899	Military
Felipe J. Serra	7th Term	November 10, 1899 – December 29, 1899	
Abraham Bandala Patiño	7th Term	December 29, 1899 – November 3, 1900	Military
Felipe J. Serra	8th Term	November 3, 1900 – December 24, 1900	
Abraham Bandala Patiño	8th Term	December 24, 1900 – November 1, 1901	Military
Manuel Martínez Guido	52nd	November 1, 1901 – January 2, 1902	
Abraham Bandala Patiño	9th Term	January 2, 1902 – February 27, 1902	Military
Manuel Martínez Guido	2nd Term	February 27, 1902 – March 10, 1902	
Abraham Bandala Patiño	10th Term	March 10, 1902 – December 31, 1902	Military
Abraham Bandala Patiño	10th Term	January 1, 1903 – October 23, 1903	Military
Manuel Martínez Guido	3rd Term	October 23, 1903 – December 1, 1903	
Abraham Bandala Patiño	11th Term	December 1, 1903 – October 26, 1904	Military
Manuel Martínez Guido	4th Term	October 27, 1904 – December 24, 1904	
Abraham Bandala Patiño	12th Term	December 24, 1904 – October 27, 1905	Military
Manuel Martínez Guido	5th Term	October 27, 1905 – December 20, 1905	
Abraham Bandala Patiño	13th Term	December 20, 1905 – December 31, 1906	Military
Abraham Bandala Patiño	13th Term	January 1, 1907 – October 17, 1907	Military
Gonzalo Acuña Pardo	53rd	October 17, 1907 – November 27, 1907	
Abraham Bandala Patiño	14th Term	November 27, 1907 – February 21, 1910	Military
Nicandro Melo	54th	February 21, 1910 – May 9, 1910	
Abraham Bandala Patiño	15th Term	May 9, 1910 – August 27, 1910	Military
Nicandro Melo	2nd Term	August 27, 1910 – September 8, 1910	
Abraham Bandala Patiño	16th Term	September 8, 1910 – December 31, 1910	Military
Policarpo Valenzuela	3rd Term	January 1, 1911 – June 9, 1911	
Manuel Mestre Ghigliazza	55th	June 9, 1911 – July 3, 1911	
Domingo Borrego Moreno	56th	July 3, 1911 – August 31, 1911	
Manuel Mestre Ghigliazza	2nd Term	September 1, 1911 – April 28, 1913	
Agustín A. Valdez	57th	April 28, 1913 – August 20, 1913	Military
Alberto Yarza Gutiérrez	58th	August 20, 1913 – September 1, 1914	Military
Luis Felipe Domínguez Suárez	59th	September 1, 1914 – November 1, 1914	Military
Carlos Greene Ramírez	60th	November 1, 1914 – February 2, 1915	Military
Aquileo Juárez	61st	February 2, 1915 – August 28, 1915	Military
Pedro C. Colorado	62nd	August 28, 1915 – August 29, 1915 (5:00 PM to 1:15 AM)	
José Gil Morales	63rd	August 29, 1915 – September 5, 1915	Military
Aquileo Juárez	2nd Term	September 5, 1915 – September 18, 1915	Military
Francisco J. Mújica	64th	September 18, 1915 – January 11, 1916	Military
Aureliano Colorado	65th	January 11, 1916 – February 24, 1916	
Francisco J. Mújica	2nd Term	February 24, 1916 – September 15, 1916	Military
Luis Felipe Domínguez Suárez	2nd Term	September 16, 1916 – May 10, 1917	Military
Joaquín Ruiz	66th	May 10, 1917 – July 5, 1918	
Luis M. Hernández	67th	July 5, 1918 – November 1, 1918	Military
Heriberto Jara	68th	November 1, 1918 – January 6, 1919	Military
Carlos A. Vidal	69th	January 6, 1919 – March 9, 1919	Military
Carlos Greene Ramírez	2nd Term	March 9, 1919 – August 21, 1919	Military
Luis Felipe Domínguez Suárez	3rd Term	March 9, 1919	Military
Esteban Abreu Domínguez	70th	March 10, 1919 – September 14, 1919	
Francisco Castellanos Díaz	71st	September 14, 1919 – September 27, 1919	
Tomás Garrido Canabal	72nd	August 21, 1919 – December 30, 1919	Tabasco Radical Socialist Party
Carlos Greene Ramírez	3rd Term	December 30, 1919 – February 6, 1920	Military
Juan Ricárdez Broca	73rd	February 6, 1920 – April 6, 1920	
Carlos Greene Ramírez	4th Term	April 6, 1920 – June 10, 1920	Military
Guillermo Escoffié	74th	June 11, 1920 – August 1, 1920	
Carlos Greene Ramírez	5th Term	August 1, 1920 – October 1920	Military
Primitivo Aguilar Suárez	75th	October 28, 1920 – January 11, 1921	
Tomás Garrido Canabal	2nd Term	October 28, 1920 – May 14, 1921	Tabasco Radical Socialist Party
Manuel Garrido Lacroix	76th	May 14, 1921 – May 21, 1921	
Tomás Garrido Canabal	3rd Term	May 21, 1921 – July 9, 1921	Tabasco Radical Socialist Party
Tobías Magaña	77th	July 9, 1921 – August 8, 1921	
Tomás Garrido Canabal	4th Term	August 9, 1921 – November 6, 1921	Tabasco Radical Socialist Party
Leonel Magaña	78th	November 7, 1921 – December 3, 1921	
Alejandro Lastra Ortiz	79th	December 4, 1921 – January 3, 1922	
Tomás Garrido Canabal	5th Term	January 4, 1922 – January 31, 1922	Tabasco Radical Socialist Party
Pedro Casanova Casao	80th	February 1, 1922 – May 19, 1922	
Santiago Ruiz Sobredo	81st	May 20, 1922 – June 6, 1922	
Miguel Torruco Jiménez	82nd	June 7, 1922 – July 6, 1922	
Pedro Casanova Casao	2nd Term	July 7, 1922 – December 31, 1922	
Tomás Garrido Canabal	6th Term	January 1, 1923 – February 4, 1923	Tabasco Radical Socialist Party
Manuel Garrido Lacroix	2nd Term	February 5, 1923 – May 5, 1923	
Tomás Garrido Canabal	7th Term	May 6, 1923 – September 20, 1923	Tabasco Radical Socialist Party
Alejandro Lastra Ortiz	2nd Term	September 21, 1923 – December 24, 1923	
Tomás Garrido Canabal	8th Term	December 25, 1923 – January 14, 1924	Tabasco Radical Socialist Party
Manuel Ferrer Vega	83rd	January 18, 1924 – January 20, 1924	Military
Manuel Antonio Romero	84th	January 21, 1924 – June 7, 1924	
Tomás Garrido Canabal	9th Term	June 8, 1924 – July 5, 1924	Tabasco Radical Socialist Party
Santiago Ruiz Sobredo	2nd Term	July 5, 1924 – December 5, 1924	
Ausencio Conrado Cruz	85th	December 6, 1924 – January 2, 1925	
Tomás Garrido Canabal	10th Term	January 2, 1925 – April 4, 1926	Tabasco Radical Socialist Party
Santiago Ruiz Sobredo	3rd Term	April 4, 1926 – October 28, 1926	
Augusto Hernández Olivé	86th	October 29, 1926 – December 31, 1926	
Ausencio Conrado Cruz	2nd Term	January 1, 1927 – April 23, 1928	
Límbano Correa	87th	April 24, 1928 – May 2, 1928	
Tomás Taracena	88th	May 2, 1928 – May 22, 1928	
Ausencio Conrado Cruz	3rd Term	May 23, 1928 – March 22, 1929	
Nicanor González	89th	March 23, 1929 – April 19, 1929	National Revolutionary Party
Manuel Lastra Ortiz	90th	April 19, 1929 – May 5, 1929	National Revolutionary Party
Ausencio Conrado Cruz	4th Term	May 5, 1929 – September 13, 1929	National Revolutionary Party
Manuel Lastra Ortiz	2nd Term	September 13, 1929 – December 4, 1929	National Revolutionary Party
Isidro María Diez	91st	December 4, 1929 – February 27, 1930	
Ausencio Conrado Cruz	5th Term	February 27, 1930 – May 15, 1930	National Revolutionary Party
Manuel Lastra Ortiz	3rd Term	May 15, 1930 – May 20, 1930	National Revolutionary Party
Ausencio Conrado Cruz	6th Term	May 27, 1930 – October 12, 1930	National Revolutionary Party
Nicanor González	92nd	October 13, 1929 – October 27, 1930	
Ausencio Conrado Cruz	7th Term	October 28, 1929 – December 31, 1930	National Revolutionary Party
Tomás Garrido Canabal	10th Term	January 1, 1931 – February 19, 1931	National Revolutionary Party
Francisco Trujillo Gurría	93rd	February 19, 1931 – February 23, 1931	National Revolutionary Party
Tomás Garrido Canabal	11th Term	February 23, 1931 – June 16, 1931	National Revolutionary Party
Francisco Trujillo Gurría	2nd Term	June 17, 1931 – June 27, 1931	National Revolutionary Party
Tomás Garrido Canabal	12th Term	June 27, 1931 – December 31, 1934	National Revolutionary Party
Manuel Lastra Ortiz	4th Term	January 1, 1935 – March 1, 1935	National Revolutionary Party
Manuel Graniel González	94th	March 2, 1935 – April 1, 1935	National Revolutionary Party
Manuel Lastra Ortiz	5th Term	April 2, 1935 – July 18, 1935	National Revolutionary Party
Aureo L. Calles Pardo	95th	July 19, 1935 – March 31, 1936	National Revolutionary Party
Víctor Fernández Manero	96th	April 1, 1936 – December 31, 1938	National Revolutionary Party
Francisco Trujillo Gurría	3rd Term	January 1, 1939 – December 31, 1942	Party of the Mexican Revolution
Noé de la Flor Casanova	97th	January 1, 1943 – December 31, 1946	Party of the Mexican Revolution
Francisco J. Santamaría	98th	January 1, 1947 – December 31, 1952	Institutional Revolutionary Party
Manuel Bartlett Bautista	99th	January 1, 1953 – March 22, 1955	Institutional Revolutionary Party
Miguel Orrico de los Llanos	100th	March 23, 1955 – December 31, 1958	Institutional Revolutionary Party
Carlos Alberto Madrazo Becerra	101st	January 1, 1959 – December 31, 1964	Institutional Revolutionary Party
Manuel R. Mora	102nd	January 1, 1965 – December 31, 1970	Institutional Revolutionary Party
Mario Trujillo García	103rd	January 1, 1971 – December 31, 1976	Institutional Revolutionary Party
Leandro Rovirosa Wade	104th	January 1, 1977 – December 31, 1982	Institutional Revolutionary Party
Enrique González Pedrero	105th	January 1, 1983 – December 14, 1987	Institutional Revolutionary Party
José María Peralta López	106th	December 14, 1987 – December 31, 1988	Institutional Revolutionary Party
Salvador Neme Castillo	107th	January 1, 1989 – January 28, 1992	Institutional Revolutionary Party
Manuel Gurría Ordóñez	108th	January 28, 1992 – December 31, 1994	Institutional Revolutionary Party
Roberto Madrazo Pintado	109th	January 1, 1995 – June 14, 1999	Institutional Revolutionary Party
Víctor Manuel Barceló	110th	June 14, 1999 – December 7, 1999	Institutional Revolutionary Party
Roberto Madrazo Pintado	2nd Term	December 8, 1999 – December 31, 2000	Institutional Revolutionary Party
Enrique Priego Oropeza	111th	January 1, 2001 – December 31, 2001	Institutional Revolutionary Party
Manuel Andrade Díaz	112th	January 1, 2002 – December 31, 2006	Institutional Revolutionary Party
Andrés Granier Melo	113th	January 1, 2007 – December 31, 2012	Institutional Revolutionary Party
Arturo Núñez Jiménez	114th	January 1, 2013 – December 31, 2018	Party of the Democratic Revolution
Adán Augusto López Hernández	115th	January 1, 2019 – August 26, 2021	National Regeneration Movement
Carlos Manuel Merino Campos	116th	August 26, 2021 – October 1, 2024	National Regeneration Movement
Javier May Rodríguez	117th	From October 1, 2024	National Regeneration Movement

== See also ==
- List of Mexican state governors

== Sources ==
- Governors of Tabasco

Specific
