= 2019 Puebla special elections =

On December 24, 2018, just ten days into her term as Governor of Puebla, Martha Erika Alonso Hidalgo and her husband, Senator Rafael Moreno Valle Rosas, died in a helicopter crash while en route from Puebla to Mexico City. The death of the Governor required the calling of a special gubernatorial election for 2 June 2019. This election was made simultaneous with special elections from five municipalities in the state whose initial 2018 elections had been nullified.

== Timeline ==
In the immediate aftermath of Alonso's death, Jesús Rodríguez Almeida, the general secretary of government, was named as the acting governor of Puebla, though state law would require the state legislature to appoint an interim leader and call a special election. On January 21, the state legislature selected 85-year-old Guillermo Pacheco Pulido, former Puebla City mayor and president of the state Supreme Court, as interim governor. A week later, on the 28th, the legislature set the election date for June 2, with the winner taking office on August 1.

On February 6, the organization of the state election was taken on by the National Electoral Institute (INE), including the gubernatorial race and special elections in five municipalities. The TEPJF had voided elections in the five municipalities—Ocoyucan, Cañada Morelos, Ahuazotepec, Mazapiltepec de Juárez and Tepeojuma—as a result of violations in the handling of ballot papers and irregularities at polling places.

== Coalitions and common candidacies ==
=== Juntos Haremos Historia en Puebla (Morena-PT-PVEM) ===
On March 13, the INE approved the coalition Juntos Haremos Historia en Puebla (Together We'll Make History in Puebla), consisting of the National Regeneration Movement (Morena), Labor Party (PT) and Ecologist Green Party of Mexico (PVEM). The Social Encounter Party (PES), which lost its national and state registrations in the wake of 2018, will participate in three of the five municipal special elections, as it had been a part of the original races.

Morena was in between with three candidates by way of a poll of its members, between senator Alejandro Armenta Mier, 2018 candidate Miguel Barbosa Huerta, and senator Nancy de la Sierra Arámburo. Morena selected Barbosa Huerta to be the candidate.

=== PAN-PRD-MC ===
The National Action Party, Party of the Democratic Revolution and Citizens' Movement will run a common candidate: Enrique Cárdenas Sánchez, history professor and former rector of the Universidad de las Américas. As a result of the common candidacy (as opposed to a coalition), each party will retain its own political advertising.

== Other parties ==
=== Institutional Revolutionary Party ===
The national organization of the Institutional Revolutionary Party selected Alberto Jiménez Merino, an agricultural scientist and former rector of the Universidad Autónoma Chapingo, as its candidate on March 5.

=== New Alliance Party ===
Nueva Alianza announced on March 5 that it would not run a candidate in the election.
