= Miguel Barbosa Huerta =

Mexican politician (1959–2022)

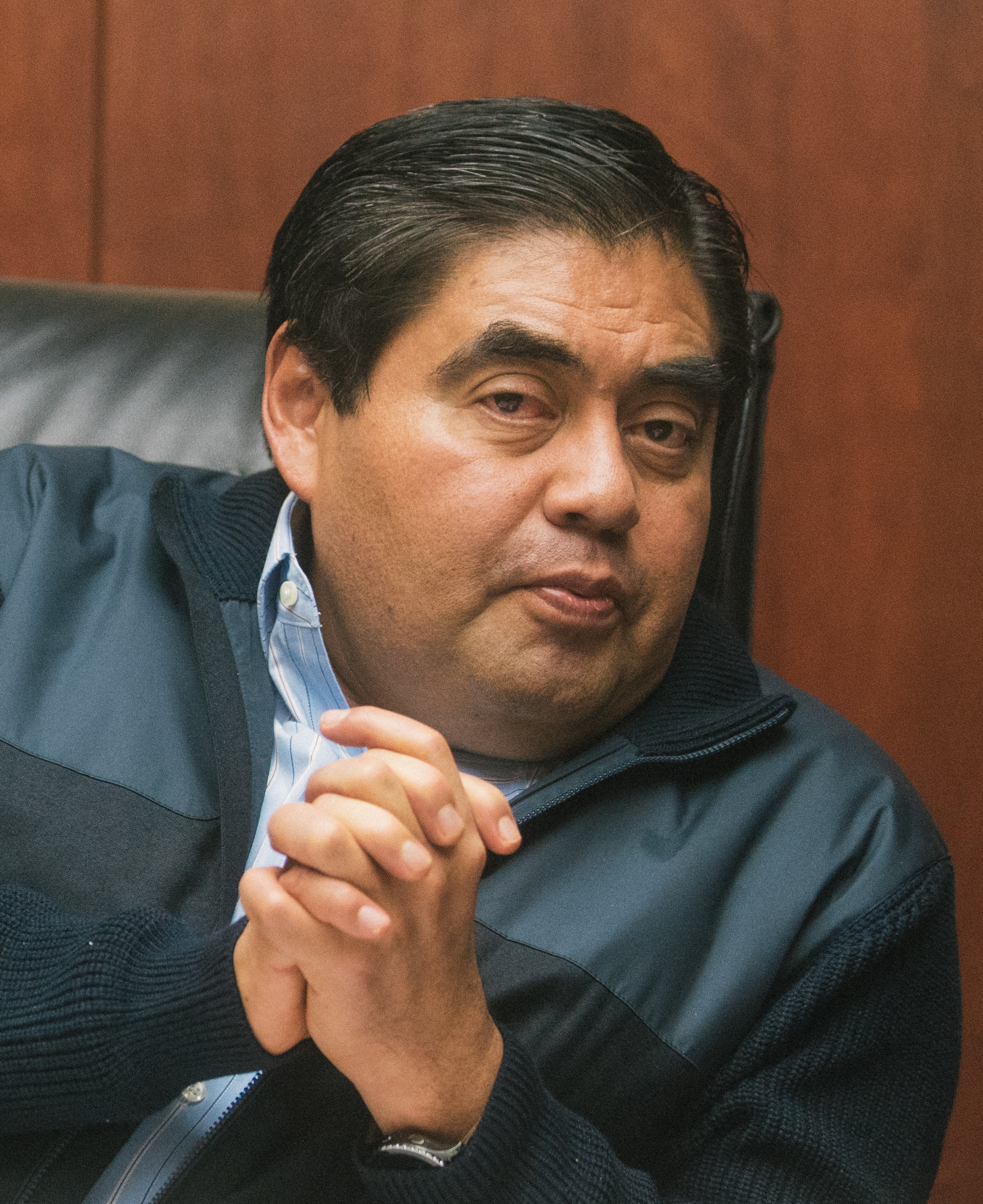
- Barbosa in 2016

Governor of Puebla
- In office 1 August 2019 – 13 December 2022
- Preceded by: Guillermo Pacheco Pulido
- Succeeded by: Sergio Salomón Céspedes

President of the Senate of Mexico
- In office 1 September 2014 – 31 August 2015
- Preceded by: Raúl Cervantes Andrade
- Succeeded by: Roberto Gil Zuarth

Member of the Chamber of Deputies from Puebla
- In office 1 September 2000 – 31 August 2003
- Constituency: 4th electoral region

Personal details
- Born: Luis Miguel Gerónimo Barbosa Huerta; 30 September 1959 Zinacatepec, Puebla, Mexico
- Died: 13 December 2022 (aged 63) Mexico City, Mexico
- Party: PRI (1977–1994); PRD (1994–2017); Morena (2017–2022)
- Education: National Autonomous University of Mexico (LLB)
- Occupation: Lawyer

Luis Miguel Gerónimo Barbosa Huerta (30 September 1959 – 13 December 2022) was a Mexican politician affiliated with Morena who served as Governor of Puebla from 2019 until his death in 2022. He was a senator of the LXII and LXIII Legislatures of the Mexican Congress and also served as a federal deputy between 2000 and 2003. He was a candidate for the governorship of Puebla for the coalition Juntos Haremos Historia—formed by Morena, the Labor Party (PT) and the Social Encounter Party (PES)—for the state elections of 2018 and the 2019 special election.

== Early life ==
Barbosa was born on 30 September 1959 in Zinacatepec as the third of five children; his family moved to Tehuacán when he was 10 years old, and he lived there until moving to Mexico City to attend the National Autonomous University of Mexico (UNAM). After obtaining a law degree from the UNAM, he returned to Tehuacán to found the law firm Barbosa Huerta y Asociados.

== Political career ==
In 1994, Barbosa joined the Party of the Democratic Revolution (PRD), becoming a national political councilor in the party in 1998 and its state leader. Two years later, he left his law firm and became a federal deputy in the LVIII Legislature, with committee assignments including Public Safety, Navy, and Parliamentary Practices.

After his three-year term in the Chamber of Deputies, Barbosa returned to the PRD and served in various party positions, as well as a member of the party's National Political Commission between 2008 and 2012, during which time he also was the national coordinator of the internal PRD group Nueva Izquierda.

=== Senate (2012–2018) ===
In 2012, the PRD elected Barbosa to the Senate of the Republic; he served from 2012 to 2018 in the LXII and LXIII Legislatures. From 2012 to 2017, he served as the PRD party coordinator in the Senate. He resigned from the post in lieu of being removed after supporting Andrés Manuel López Obrador as a presidential candidate for 2018, in the wake of López Obrador's departure from the party several years prior.

From 2014 to 2015, in the final year of the LXII Legislature, Barbosa served as president of the Senate, marking the first time that leftists presided over both chambers of Congress.

=== 2018 gubernatorial campaign ===
In October 2017, six months after joining the party, Morena designated Barbosa as its state electoral organization coordinator, a position typically given by the party to its eventual gubernatorial nominees, after winning an internal poll.

In the gubernatorial election in 2018, Barbosa ran as the candidate of the Juntos Haremos Historia (Together We'll Make History) coalition but lost to Martha Érika Alonso Hidalgo, whose PAN-led coalition obtained four more percentage points of the vote. Barbosa supporters challenged the election results in court, and in early December 2018, the Superior Chamber of the Federal Electoral Tribunal affirmed Alonso's victory.

=== 2019 gubernatorial campaign ===
Shortly after being sworn in, however, Alonso died in a helicopter crash in December 2018. Barbosa later claimed that he had won the election, speaking in late 2019 that "they stole it from me, but God punished them" without using their names.

As the death occurred in the first two years of the gubernatorial term, a special election was held to fill the seat. A similar Juntos Haremos Historia coalition, with the Ecologist Green Party of Mexico (PVEM) replacing the liquidated Social Encounter, ran Barbosa as its candidate and received 44.6 percent of the vote. The election saw the lowest turnout for any gubernatorial vote in two decades in the state.

=== Governorship ===
On 1 August 2019, Barbosa was sworn in as governor of Puebla; in his inaugural speech, he noted the state's debt of 44 billion pesos. During Barbosa's more than three years as governor, he investigated alleged fraud by Alonso's husband, former Puebla governor Rafael Moreno Valle Rosas, and he clashed with state figures including other Morena members and the Morena mayor of Puebla, the rector of the Meritorious Autonomous University of Puebla, and social organizations. His style, including morning press conferences that emulated those of López Obrador, increased political polarization in the state.

The COVID-19 pandemic in Mexico dominated Barbosa's time in office; on 24 March 2020, he claimed that only the wealthy were at risk of contracting the disease and that the poor—including himself—were immune. On 19 January 2022, he tested positive for the virus. Natural disasters also occupied the state government's time and attention: in May 2021, a sinkhole opened in a farm field in the municipality of Juan C. Bonilla.

The head of the state chapter of CANACINTRA, a private industry group, appraised his administration as not doing enough to attract investment, in part due to bureaucracy, and as overseeing an increase in the crime rate, including more violent crimes such as lynchings and murders, though he also praised the governor for his management of the pandemic.

Among the last policies announced by the state government was a new requirement, to take effect in 2023, that vehicles entering Puebla and registered in other states had to buy a "Tourist Pass" as part of a scheme to encourage residents to register their vehicles locally in the state and thus to comply with new environmental regulations and emissions tests.

== Personal life ==
Barbosa was married to María del Rosario Orozco Caballero. Barbosa and Orozco had two children.

== Death ==
At 8:30 a.m. on 13 December 2022, Barbosa was transported to a public hospital in the city of Puebla and later by helicopter to Mexico City, where he died. President Andrés Manuel López Obrador announced his death the same afternoon. Barbosa had had complications of type 2 diabetes for decades, including having his right foot amputated in 2014 due to sepsis. Rumors had circulated of a medical event involving the governor since the preceding day, and at his last public appearance, he admitted that he was suffering from pain in his arm. His death made him the second governor to die in office in four years.

Unlike after Martha Érika Alonso's death, when a special election was called, the state legislature would appoint a successor to Barbosa because the vacancy occurred in the final four years of the gubernatorial term. State secretary of government Ana Lucía Hill Mayoral took control of the governor's office until the legislature designated a substitute governor. This occurred early on 15 December with the appointment of Sergio Salomón Céspedes of Tepeaca, who had been the leader of the Morena deputies in Puebla's state legislature.
