= Ana Lucía Hill Mayoral =

Mexican academic and politician (born 1970)

Ana Lucía Hill Mayoral (Torreón, Coahuila; October 15, 1971) is a Mexican academic, professor and politician. In February 2021 she was appointed Secretary of Government of the State of Puebla. Between December 13 and December 15, 2022, she was in charge of the Office of Governor (Acting Governor) of the State of Puebla as a result of the death of Governor Miguel Barbosa Huerta. After that period, Hill Mayoral resigned as Secretary of Government.

== Studies and academic career ==
Ana Lucía Hill Mayoral studied a bachelor's degree in social sciences at the Instituto Tecnológico Autónomo de México, followed by a master's degree in Political Management from George Washington University in the United States. Later, she completed her doctorate in Crisis, Disaster, and Risk Management from the same institution. She was a professor at the Universidad Anáhuac México, the Instituto Tecnológico y de Estudios Superiores de Monterrey at its Mexico City campus, and the Escuela Nacional de Protección Civil at its Chiapas campus.

In June 2003 Hill Mayoral was honored by the Kentucky state government for the contribution she has made to the Latin American community in the United States. She has also worked as an advisor on civil protection matters for the Mexican Chamber of Deputies, the Mexico City Congress, and the Government of Jamaica.

In 2002, she received the "Rising Star of Politics" award from the U.S. magazine Campaigns & Elections, becoming the first Latin American woman to receive this distinction. In 2007, she was awarded an honorary doctorate for her leadership, commitment to society, and contribution to the country's development. In 2023, she was named the Resilience Personality by the LatAm Resilience Awards.

In 2025, Minerva University granted her the Minerva Certified Instructor designation, making her the only individual to date to have received this recognition.

== Political career ==
In 2007, Ana Lucía was appointed Director General for Civil Protection at Mexico’s Ministry of the Interior (Secretaría de Gobernación) following her successful participation in the Federal Government’s Professional Career Civil Service system.

On January 27, 2020, Hill Mayoral was appointed general coordinator of civil protection for the State of Puebla by Governor Miguel Barbosa. On February 24, 2021, she was appointed secretary of the government of the State of Puebla.

On December 13, 2022, she was appointed in charge of the office of the Governor (acting governor) of the State of Puebla after the death of Miguel Barbosa Huerta. She held the position for two days, until the early morning of December 15, when the LXI Legislature of the Congress of the State of Puebla appointed Sergio Salomón Céspedes as substitute governor. That same day, Hill Mayoral submitted her resignation to the Secretary of the Interior of the State of Puebla.

Ana Lucía Hill has never held formal affiliation with any political party.
