= Timeline of Puebla (city) =

Mexican city's timeline

Coordinates: 19.051389°N 98.217778°W

The following is a timeline of the history of the city of Puebla, Mexico.

== Prior to 18th century ==
- 1531
  - Puebla founded by Toribio Motolinia and Sebastián Ramírez de Fuenleal.
  - First mass celebrated 16 April 1531 by Toribio Motolinia.
- 1533-1545 - Indios de Servicio provide labor to Puebla.
- 1537 – College of the Holy Ghost founded by Jesuits.
- 1541 – Textile mill in operation.
- 1542 – School established.
- 1543 – Catholic Diocese of Tlaxcala headquartered in Puebla.
- 1551 – San Francisco Convent active.
- 1552 – Puebla Cathedral construction begins.
- 1555 – Fountain installed in Plaza Mayor.
- 1556 – Joseph designated city patron saint.
- 1578 - Colegio del Espíritu Santo founded
- 1580 – Casa del Deán built.
- 1592 – Hospital de San Roque founded.
- 1609 – Convent of Santa Monica founded.
- 1629 – Juan Gutiérrez de Padilla becomes Cathedral maestro de capilla.
- 1632 – Hospital de San Bernardo opens.
- 1639-1653 - Juan de Palafox y Mendoza, Bishop of Puebla
- 1640 – Printing press in operation (approximate date).
- 1646 – Biblioteca Palafoxiana founded.
- 1649 – Puebla Cathedral consecrated.
- 1653 – Potters' guild established.
- 1659 – Church of Santo Domingo built (approximate date).
- 1678 – Population: 68,800.
- 1688 - Death of Catarina de San Juan, "la China Poblana"
- 1690
  - Capilla del Rosario (Puebla) (chapel) built in the Church of Santo Domingo.
  - Puebla Cathedral completed.

== 18th and 19th centuries ==
- 1728 – Museum of antiquities established.
- 1760 – Teatro Principal inaugurated.
- 1764 – Estaban Bravo de Rivero becomes mayor.
- 1767 – La Compania (Jesuit church) built.
- 1771 – Jose Merino Ceballos becomes mayor.
- 1793 – Population: 56,859.
- 1813 – Academia de Bellas Artes founded.
- 1827 – El Poblano newspaper begins publication.
- 1844 – Paseo Bravo (street) laid out.
- 1846 – El Patricio newspaper in publication.
- 1847 – Siege of Puebla by United States forces.
- 1862
  - May 5: Battle of Puebla occurs near city.
  - City renamed "Puebla de Zaragoza".
- 1863 – May 16–17: Siege of Puebla by French forces.
- 1867 - Seized by Mexicans under Porfirio Díaz.
- 1868 – Guerrero theatre opens.
- 1869 – Apizaco-Puebla Mexican Railway line built.
- 1879 – Population: 64,588.
- 1891 – Penitenciaria (prison) built.
- 1893 – Velodrome in use.
- 1895 – Population: 91,917.
- 1897 – Railway station built.
- 1898 – Rancho de la Magdalena becomes part of city.
- 1900 – Population: 93,521.

== 20th century ==
- 1901 – Franco-Mexican monument erected (approximate date).
- 1906 – Palacio Municipal de Puebla built.
- 1910
  - Victoria Market opens.
  - Population: 101,214.
- 1911 – Gaceta de Puebla newspaper begins publication.
- 1924 – La Opinion newspaper in publication.
- 1926 – Mexico City-Puebla highway completed.
- 1931
  - 400th anniversary of city founding.
  - Population: 124,063.
- 1937 – University of Puebla founded.
- 1942 - Colegio Americano de Puebla founded.
- 1944
  - Club de Fútbol Puebla formed.
  - El Sol de Puebla newspaper begins publication.
  - Museo José Luis Bello y González (museum) opens.
- 1950 – Population: 206,840.
- 1960 – Population: 297,257.
- 1962 – Area of city expanded.
- 1964 – Volkswagen automotive manufactory begins operating.
- 1968 – Estadio Cuauhtémoc (stadium) opens.
- 1973 – Universidad Popular Autónoma del Estado de Puebla and Museo de Arte Cultural Poblano established.
- 1979 – the third General Episcopal Conference of Latin America took place at the Palafox Major Seminary in Puebla, commencing on 28 January 1979.
- 1985 – Hermanos Serdán International Airport inaugurated.
- 1987
  - Historic Downtown area designated an UNESCO World Heritage Site.
  - Jardín Botánico Universitario de la Benemérita Universidad Autónoma de Puebla (garden) established.
- 1988 – Central de Autobuses Puebla (depot) inaugurated.
- 1991 – Amparo Museum inaugurated.

== 21st century ==
- 2002 – San Pedro Museum of Art active.
- 2005 – Enrique Dóger becomes mayor.
- 2008 – Blanca Alcalá becomes mayor.
- 2010
  - Eduardo Rivera Pérez elected mayor.
  - Population: 1,434,062; metro 2,668,437.
- 2014 – José Antonio Gali Fayad becomes mayor.
- 2017 - Puebla earthquake

== See also ==
- Puebla history (city)
- List of mayors of Puebla (city)
- History of Puebla (state)
- List of governors in the Viceroyalty of New Spain: Province of Puebla
- List of governors of Puebla (state)

== Bibliography ==
- Altman, Ida, Transatlantic Ties in the Spanish Empire: Brihuega, Spain and Puebla, Mexico 1560-1620. Stanford: Stanford University Press 2000.
- David Marley (2005), "Puebla", Historic Cities of the Americas, vol. 1, Santa Barbara, California: ABC-CLIO, pp. 288–301, ISBN 1576070271
- Ramos, Frances L. Identity, Ritual, and Power in Colonial Puebla. Tucson: University of Arizona Press ISBN 978-0-8165-2117-3
- "Puebla". Chambers's Encyclopaedia. London. 1901.
- "History and Description: Special Places: Puebla (City)". List of Works in the New York Public Library Relating to Mexico. New York Public Library. 1909.
- "Puebla (city)" . Encyclopædia Britannica. Vol. 22 (11th ed.). 1910. p. 633.
- W.H. Koebel, ed. (1921), "Mexico: Chief Towns: Puebla", Anglo-South American Handbook, vol. 1, New York: Macmillan, hdl:2027/mdp.39015027978728
- Alice Ray Catalyne (1966). "Music of the Sixteenth to Eighteenth Centuries in the Cathedral of Puebla, Mexico". Anuario. 2: 75–90. doi:10.2307/779767. JSTOR 779767.
- Florence C. Lister and Robert H. Lister (1984). "Potters' Quarter of Colonial Puebla, Mexico". Historical Archaeology. 18 (1): 87–102. doi:10.1007/BF03374041. JSTOR 25615476. S2CID 163002069.
- Wil Pansters (1990). "Social Movement and Discourse: The Case of the University Reform Movement in 1961 in Puebla, Mexico". Bulletin of Latin American Research. 9 (1): 79–101. doi:10.2307/3338217. JSTOR 3338217.
- José Luis Lezama (1994). "Mexico: Puebla". In Gerald Michael Greenfield (ed.). Latin American Urbanization: Historical Profiles of Major Cities. Greenwood Press. ISBN 0313259372.
- Nancy E. Churchill (1999). "El Paseo del Río San Francisco: Urban Development and Social Justice in Puebla, Mexico". Social Justice. 26 (3 (77)): 156–173. JSTOR 29767166.
- Jones and Varley (1999). "Reconquest of the historic centre: urban conservation and gentrification in Puebla, Mexico". Environment and Planning. 31 (31): 1547–1566. doi:10.1068/a311547. S2CID 155082267.

=== Guidebooks ===
- Josiah Conder (1830), "Puebla", Mexico and Guatimala, The Modern Traveller, vol. 25, London: J.Duncan
- Alfred Ronald Conkling (1893), "Puebla", Appletons' Guide to Mexico, New York: D. Appleton & Company
- Henry Moore (1894), "Commercial Directory: Puebla", Railway Guide of the Republic of Mexico, Springfield, Ohio: Huben & Moore, OCLC 22498265
- "Puebla", Vamos á México, Chicago: Southern Pacific Company, 1896
- "Mexico: Puebla", United States (4th ed.), Leipzig: K. Baedeker, 1909, OCLC 02338437
- Reau Campbell (1909), "Puebla", Campbell's New Revised Complete Guide and Descriptive Book of Mexico, Chicago: Rogers & Smith Co., OCLC 1667015
- John Fisher (1999), "Puebla", Mexico, Rough Guides (4th ed.), London, p. 341+, OL 24935876M
- "Central Mexico: Puebla", Mexico, Let's Go, 1999 (fulltext via OpenLibrary)
- "Around Mexico City: Puebla", Mexico, Lonely Planet, 1998 (fulltext via OpenLibrary)
- Thomas Philip Terry (1923). "Puebla". Terry's Guide to Mexico. Boston: Houghton Mifflin.

=== Works in Spanish ===
- Manuel Caballero (1892). "Puebla y su Capital: Ciudad de Los Angeles". Primer directorio general del Estado de Puebla (in Spanish). Mexico: Tip. de E. Dublán y Comp.
- Miguel Palma y Campos (1898). Guia del turista en la ciudad de Puebla (in Spanish) (2nd ed.). Imprenta de M. Corona Cervantes.
- J. Figueroa Doménech (1899). "Estado de Puebla". Guía General Descriptiva de la República Mexicana (in Spanish). Mexico: R. de S. N. Araluce. (includes directory)
- José Toribio Medina (1908). La imprenta en la Puebla de los Angeles (1640-1821) (in Spanish). Santiago de Chile: Imprenta Cervantes – via HathiTrust. (Annotated list of titles published in Puebla, arranged chronologically)
- "Puebla de Zaragoza", Baedeker's Mexico, 1994, p. 389+ (fulltext via OpenLibrary)
