= Guillermo Pacheco Pulido =

Mexican politician

Governor of Puebla Acting
- In office 21 January 2019 – 31 July 2019
- Preceded by: Jesús Rodríguez Almeida
- Succeeded by: Miguel Barbosa Huerta

President of the Chamber of Deputies
- In office 1 December 1992 – 14 April 1993
- Preceded by: María de los Ángeles Moreno
- Succeeded by: Laura Garza Galindo

Member of Congress
- In office 1991–1994
- Constituency: Puebla's 12th

Municipal president of Puebla
- In office 1987–1990

Member of Congress
- In office 1982–1985
- Constituency: Puebla's 2nd

Personal details
- Born: 8 February 1933 (age 93) Puebla, Puebla, Mexico
- Party: Institutional Revolutionary Party (PRI)
- Occupation: Lawyer

Guillermo Pacheco Pulido (born 8 February 1933) is a Mexican politician affiliated with the Institutional Revolutionary Party (PRI). On 21 January 2019, the Congress of Puebla elected him as acting governor of Puebla, a position in which he served until 31 July of the same year. He had served as a deputy of the Congress of the Union in the 52nd Congress from 1982 to 1985 and in the 55th Congress from 1991 to 1994. He had also been a local deputy during the 43rd session of the Congress of Puebla from 1966 to 1969, municipal president of Puebla de Zaragoza from 1987 to 1990 and president of the Superior Court of Justice of Puebla from 1999 to 2008.

== Early life and education ==
Guillermo Pacheco Pulido was born in the city of Puebla on 8 February 1933. He studied at the Autonomous University of Puebla, where he obtained a degree in law. He was state leader of the National Confederation of Popular Organizations (CNOP).

== Political career ==
Pacheco Pulido was a local deputy of the Congress of Puebla from 1966 to 1969 during its 43rd session, representing district 3, based in the city of Puebla. From 1982 to 1985 he was a federal deputy in the 52nd Congress representing Puebla's 2nd district. He was municipal president of Puebla de Zaragoza from 1987 to 1990 and was again a federal deputy from 1991 to 1994 in the 55th Congress representing Puebla's 12th district.

=== Acting governor of Puebla ===
Puebla governor Martha Erika Alonso died in a helicopter crash on 24 December 2018; Jesús Rodríguez Almeida headed the office temporarily after her death. Pacheco Pulido, by then 86 years old, was appointed acting governor 27 days after Alonso's death.

During his six-month incumbency it was reported that he spent 80% of the Puebla government funds for all of 2019, and awarded contracts worth millions to politicians and companies later under investigation for fraud.
