= 12th federal electoral district of Puebla =

Federal electoral district of Mexico

Puebla's 12th
- Electoral district of the Chamber of Deputies of Mexico

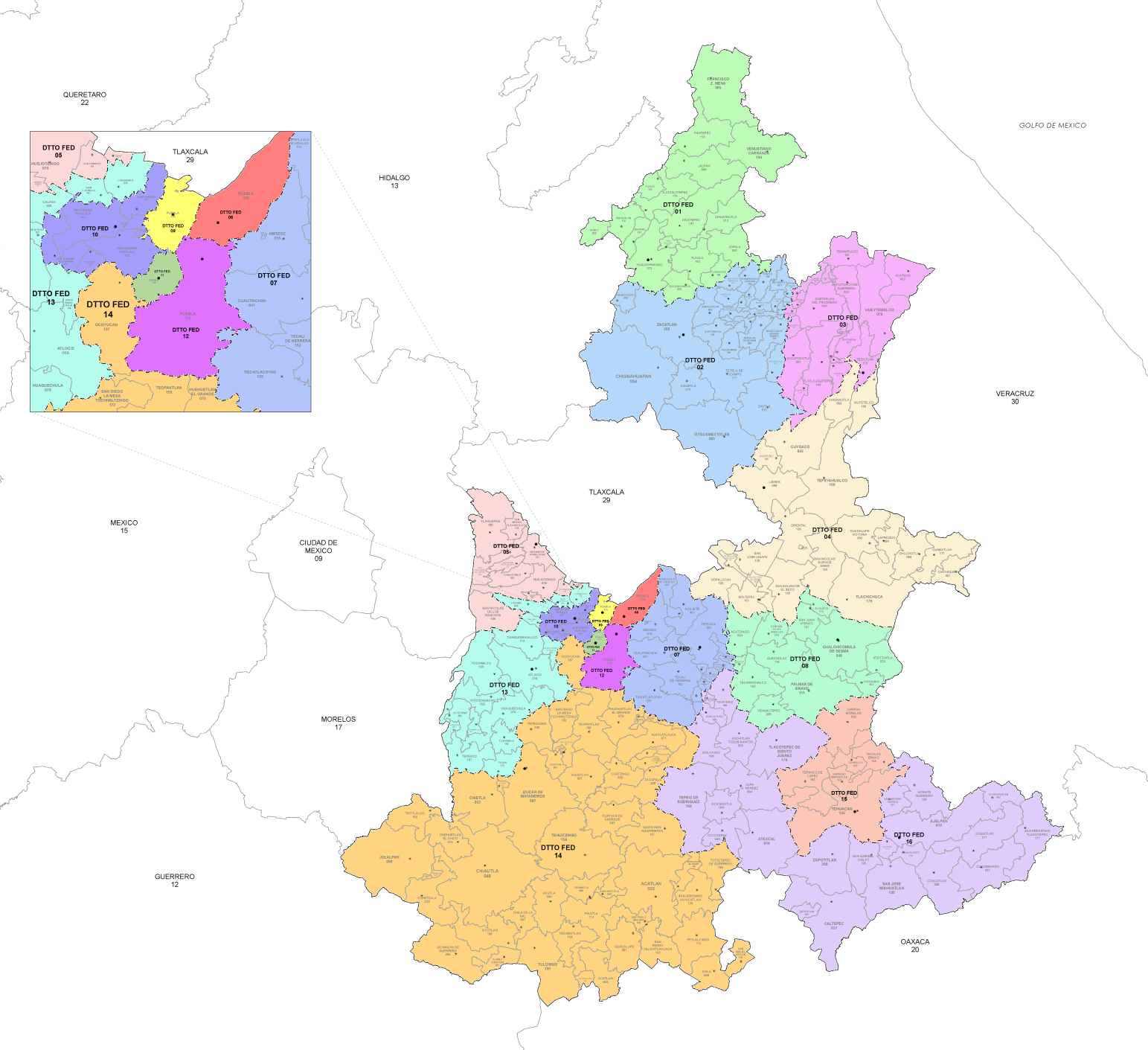
- 12th district since 2023

Incumbent
- Member: Nora Merino Escamilla
- Party: ▌Labour Party
- Congress: 66th (2024–2027)

District
- State: Puebla
- Head town: Puebla de Zaragoza
- Coordinates: 19°02′N 98°11′W
- Covers: Municipality of Puebla (part)
- PR region: Fourth
- Precincts: 224
- Population: 419,338 (2020 census)

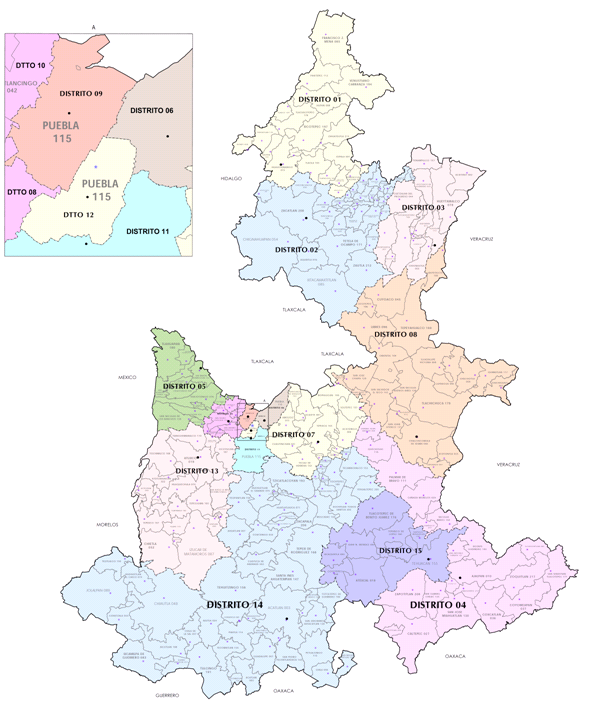
Puebla's districts in 2017–2022

The 12th federal electoral district of Puebla (Spanish: Distrito electoral federal 12 de Puebla) is one of the 300 electoral districts into which Mexico is divided for elections to the federal Chamber of Deputies and one of 16 such districts in the state of Puebla.

It elects one deputy to the lower house of Congress for each three-year legislative session by means of the first-past-the-post system. Votes cast in the district also count towards the calculation of proportional representation ("plurinominal") deputies elected from the fourth region.

Suspended in 1930, (Note: An amendment to Article 52 of the Constitution in 1928 changed the original provision of "one deputy per 60,000 inhabitants" to "one deputy per 100,000"; as a result, the size of the Chamber of Deputies fell from 281 in the 1928 election to 171 in 1934.) Puebla's 12th was re-established as part of the 1977 political reforms. The restored district returned its first deputy in the 1979 mid-term election.

The current member for the district, elected in the 2024 general election, is Nora Yessica Merino Escamilla of the Labour Party (PT).

== District territory ==
Under the 2023 districting plan adopted by the National Electoral Institute (INE), which is to be used for the 2024, 2027 and 2030 federal elections, Puebla's congressional seat allocation rose from 15 to 16. The 12th district covers 224 electoral precincts (secciones electorales) in the municipality of Puebla. (Note: The 6th, 7th, 9th and 11th districts cover the remainder of the municipality.)

The head town (cabecera distrital), where results from individual polling stations are gathered together and tallied, is the state capital, the city of Puebla. The district reported a population of 419,338 in the 2020 census.

== Previous districting schemes ==
Evolution of electoral district numbers
	1974	1978	1996	2005	2017	2023
Puebla	10	14	15	16	15	16
Chamber of Deputies	196	300				

2017–2022

From 2017 to 2022, when Puebla was assigned 15 congressional seats, the district's head town was the city of Puebla and it covered 292 precincts.

2005–2017

Under the 2005 plan, the district was one of 16 in Puebla. Its head town was the state capital and it covered 180 precincts in the municipality.

1996–2005

Between 1996 and 2005, Puebla had 15 districts. The 12th covered 166 precincts in the municipality of Puebla, with its head town at the city of Puebla.

1978–1996

The districting scheme in force from 1978 to 1996 was the result of the 1977 electoral reforms, which increased the number of single-member seats in the Chamber of Deputies from 196 to 300. Under that plan, Puebla's seat allocation rose from 10 to 14. The 12 district's head town was the city of Puebla and it comprised parts of the city and its municipality.

== Deputies returned to Congress ==
(Mexico) National parties
- Current
- PAN
- PRI
- PT
- PVEM
- MC
- Morena
- PAZ
- Somos
- Defunct or local only
- PLM
- PNR
- PRM
- PNM
- PP
- PPS
- PARM
- PFCRN
- CON
- PANAL
- PSD
- PES
- PES
- PRD

Puebla's 12th district
Election	Deputy	Party	Term	Legislature
1916	Porfirio del Castillo		1916–1917	Constituent Congress of Querétaro
...
The 12th district was suspended between 1930 and 1979
1979	Francisco Sánchez Díaz de Rivera	Institutional Revolutionary Party	1979–1982	51st Congress
1982	Manuel R. Villa Issa	Institutional Revolutionary Party	1982–1985	52nd Congress
1985	Germán Sierra Sánchez	Institutional Revolutionary Party	1985–1988	53rd Congress
1988	Marco Antonio Rojas Flores	Institutional Revolutionary Party	1988–1991	54th Congress
1991	Guillermo Pacheco Pulido	Institutional Revolutionary Party	1991–1994	55th Congress
1994	Luis Antonio Godina Herrera	Institutional Revolutionary Party	1994–1997	56th Congress
1997	Celso Fuentes Ramírez	Institutional Revolutionary Party	1997–2000	57th Congress
2000	Alfonso Vicente Díaz	National Action Party (Mexico)	2000–2003	58th Congress
2003	Myriam de Lourdes Arabian Couttolenc	National Action Party (Mexico)	2003–2006	59th Congress
2006	Antonio Sánchez Díaz de Rivera	National Action Party (Mexico)	2006–2009	60th Congress
2009	Leobardo Soto Martínez	Institutional Revolutionary Party	2009–2012	61st Congress
2012	Néstor Octavio Gordillo Castillo	National Action Party (Mexico)	2012–2015	62nd Congress
2015	Víctor Manuel Giorgana Jiménez	Ecologist Green Party of Mexico	2015–2018	63rd Congress
2018	Fernando Luis Manzanilla Prieto	Social Encounter Party	2018–2021	64th Congress
2021	Mario Gerardo Riestra Piña	National Action Party (Mexico)	2021–2024	65th Congress
2024	Nora Yessica Merino Escamilla	Labour Party (Mexico)	2024–2027	66th Congress

== Presidential elections ==
Puebla's 12th district
Election	District won by	Party or coalition	%
2018	Andrés Manuel López Obrador	Juntos Haremos Historia	58.0560
2024	Claudia Sheinbaum Pardo	Sigamos Haciendo Historia	55.6225
