= Kamel Nacif Borge =

Mexican businessman

José Kamel Nacif Borge (born 1946 in Mexico City) is a Mexican businessman of Lebanese descent known in his country as "El Rey de la Mezclilla" (the Denim King). Once considered one of the richest men in Mexico.

He started out as a small merchant by importing fabrics from overseas until he eventually built a textile empire that employed over 20,000 people. In 1999, he partnered with an apparel company known as the Tarrant Apparel Group, who manufactured denim jeans for brands such as Calvin Klein, Tommy Hilfiger, Chaps, Gap, Abercrombie & Fitch, and American Eagle Outfitters.

In 2002 Vicente Fox and Pablo Salazar Mendiguchía celebrated with him a new export textile factory in San Cristobal de las Casas.

In 2004 he acquired 100% of the company "Tarrant Apparel Group", an organization with subsidiaries in Chile, China, Thailand, Korea and in the United States for $44 million. The Sun Herald referred to an investigation of the Game Commission of Nevada. His close relationship with the Mexican government was confirmed when he became the beneficiary of a soft loan of 5 million dollars during the Fobaproa program.

== Legal issues ==
In 2005–06, he became embroiled in scandals of political nature. During this time he was accused of negotiating the non-approval of gambling laws in Mexico with Emilio Gamboa Patrón and more importantly, being involved in false accusations against him.

He was named in Los Demonios del Edén (Demons of Eden), the exposé by journalist Lydia Cacho, as having pulled strings to protect child abuser Jean Succar Kuri. Subsequently, he had her arrested on the charge of defamation and was captured on tape assuring the Governor of Puebla Mario Marín that she would be in jail.

In 2019, attorney general Alejandro Gertz Manero announced an arrest warrant against both Nacif and Marín, as well as the issuance of a Red notice by Interpol, for the kidnapping and torture of Cacho. He then fled to Lebanon, where he was not apprehended in July 2020. In 2021 a court legally cleared him of all responsibility
