= Elections in Mexico =

Elections in Mexico are held for officials at federal, state, and municipal levels. At the federal level, the nation's head of state, the president, is directly elected with the popular vote by all Mexican citizens for a six-year non-renewable term. All members of the bicameral federal legislature, the Congress of the Union, are also elected by all Mexican citizens. At the state level, each state has an elective governor and unicameral congress. At the municipal level, the municipal presidents are also elected by their citizens. Since 2016, a constitutional amendment has designated Mexico City to be a fully autonomous entity on par with the states. Its city head ("mayor"), city congress, and borough mayors are elected by their citizens, similarly to those states.

== Voting ==
=== Voter eligibility ===
Mexican citizens over 18 are eligible to vote in all Mexican elections. To carry the ballot, the citizen should first request a Voter Credential (Spanish: Credencial para votar), a plastic card issued by the National Electoral Institute (Spanish: Instituto Nacional Electoral, INE) of the federal government.

To receive a voter credential, citizens need:

- Proof of either their birth in Mexico or their naturalization.
- Some form of photo ID.
- Proof of residence.

=== Electoral system ===
Mexico is a federal republic. The electoral system is regulated by the Constitution of Mexico and the constitutions of the 32 federative entities. These constitutions separate powers into three branches: executive, legislative, and judicial. The heads of the executive and all members of the legislature are open to election by the citizens. Officials of the judiciary were previously not open to election until the approval of the 2024 Mexican judicial reform. The first judicial elections was held in 2025.

The heads of government executive bodies are commonly directly elected by popular vote for a six-year term. Terms of elected executives are non-renewable, and seeking to be reelected is forbidden by the Constitution. The executive election is held through voting on a single plurality ballot for the candidate, and the winner is decided by first-past-the-post voting.

The members of the legislatures are commonly directly elected by popular vote for a three-year (federal and local deputies) or a six-year (senators) term. There are usually term limits placed on legislative members (12 years at the federal level, not eligible for immediate re-election starting in 2030). All legislative elections have mixed electoral systems. The votes are counted toward candidates and political parties through one-ballot mixed single or two-ballot parallel voting. The winners are decided by a hybrid across first-past-the-post voting (single-member district), party-list proportional representation, and/or mixed-member proportional representation.

=== Political parties ===
Mexico has a multi-party system with three dominant political parties. Before 2000, Mexico had a system of one-party dominance under the Institutional Revolutionary Party and some smaller opposition parties. Alliances and coalitions are common. Usually, they are local (state) affairs and involve one of the big three and any number of minor parties, though, on extraordinary occasions, two of the big three will ally themselves against the third (e.g., the 2003 Colima state election or the 2004 Chihuahua state election).

=== Indigenous communities ===
Article 2 of the Constitution of Mexico provides for the self-government of indigenous communities according to their "traditional customs" (Spanish: Sistema de usos y costumbres). This has resulted in several indigenous communities in Mexico maintaining local systems, notably those of Cherán and areas under Councils of Good Government control.

== Federal elections ==
According to the Constitution of Mexico, several important officials of the federal government of Mexico (Spanish: Gobierno federal de México or Poderes de la Unión) shall be elected by all Mexican citizens, including the president of Mexico, who serves as the head of state and head of government, all members of the bicameral Congress of the Union that consists of the Chamber of Deputies and the Senate of the Republic, as well as the top officials of the judiciary, including the Supreme Court of Justice of the Nation, along with other courts and tribunals.

Under the current Mexican electoral system, the president of Mexico is directly elected for a six-year non-renewable term. The 128 senators are elected for a six-year term. The 500 deputies are elected for a three-year term. The elections are synchronized so that Mexican citizens elect the president, senators, and deputies at once every six years. A midterm election for deputies will occur at the midpoint of the six-year term. Federal elections are typically held on the first Sunday in June.

The last general election for president, the Senate, and the Chamber of Deputies was held on 2 June 2024. The next Chamber of Deputies election is expected in 2027, while the next presidential and Senate elections are scheduled for 2030.

Following the 2024 judicial reform, the first judicial elections took place on 1 June 2025, with subsequent elections also planned for 2027.

Elected officials of the federal government of Mexico
Branch	Institution		Official	Number	Term limit
Executive	President			1	6-year, non-renewable
Legislative	Congress of the Union	Chamber of Deputies	Deputy	500	3-year, max 4 terms
Legislative	Congress of the Union	Senate of the Republic	Senator	128	6-year, max 2 terms
Judicial	Supreme Court of Justice of the Nation		Justice	9	12-year, non-renewable
Judicial	Judicial Disciplinary Tribunal		Magistrate	5	6-year, non-renewable
Judicial	Electoral Tribunal of the Federal Judiciary	Superior Chamber	Magistrate	7	6-year, non-renewable
Judicial	Electoral Tribunal of the Federal Judiciary	Regional Chamber	Magistrate	15	6-year, non-renewable
Judicial	Circuit Court		Magistrate	910	9-year, max 2 terms
Judicial	District Court		Judge	737	9-year, max 2 terms

=== Presidential elections ===
The president of Mexico (Spanish: Presidente de México) is elected for a six-year term by direct election of all Mexican citizens. The candidate who wins a plurality of votes is elected president. No president can serve more than a single term in office. Therefore, every presidential election in Mexico is a non-incumbent election.

Mexico does not have an office of vice president.

==== Eligibility ====
Candidates for president must be at least 35 years old. They must be Mexican citizens by birth, as must one of their parents. They must have been residents of Mexico for at least 20 years. They also cannot have been either the governor of a state or the head of government of Mexico City for six months before the election.

=== Congressional elections ===
The Congress of the Union (Spanish: Congreso de la Unión) comprises two chambers: the Chamber of Deputies and the Senate of the Republic.

==== Chamber of Deputies elections ====
The Chamber of Deputies (Spanish: Cámara de Diputados) has 500 deputies (Spanish: diputados). The deputies are elected to a three-year term through a two-ballot parallel voting system. They may serve up to four consecutive terms (non-consecutive starting in 2030).

- Three hundred (300) uninominal deputies (Spanish: diputados uninominales) are elected by candidate votes in single-seat federal electoral districts (Spanish: distritos electorales federales) using the first-past-the-post method. The federal electoral districts are divided among the 32 federative entities based on a population of approximately 330,000 citizens each.
- Two hundred (200) plurinominal deputies (Spanish: diputados plurinominales) are elected by party-list votes in five 40-seat electoral regions (Spanish: circunscripciones electorales) using proportional representation. Each electoral region contains multiple federative entities and considers a balance of the total national population.

To be eligible to place candidates in the multi-seat districts, a party must have candidates in at least 200 of the 300 single-seat districts and must win at least 3% of the vote in those elections. The 200 proportional representation seats are distributed based on the percentage of the total national votes earned by each party without considering the 300 plurality seats (parallel voting). However, since 1996, a party cannot get more seats than 8% above its national result (i.e., to win 50% of the legislative seats, a party must win at least 42% of the vote nationwide). There are three exceptions to this rule: first, a party can only lose proportional representation seats due to this rule (and no plurality seats); second, a party can never get more than 300 seats overall (even if it has more than 52% of the vote nationally); and third, a party can exceed this 8% rule if it wins the seats in the single-member districts.

Candidates for the Chamber of Deputies must be registered voters at least 18 years old. They must also have been born in or resided in the states they are running in for at least six months.

==== Senate elections ====
The Senate of the Republic (Spanish: Senado de la República), or Chamber of Senators (Spanish: Cámara de Senadores), has 128 senators (Spanish: senadores). Senators are elected to a six-year term through a one-ballot mixed single vote system, where the single party-list vote is counted in the following two ways. Senators may run for two consecutive terms (non-consecutive starting in 2030).

- Ninety-six (96) senators are elected from the 32 federative entities. Each federative entity elects three senators by mixed-member proportional representation, where two seats are awarded to the party or coalition with the most votes, and one seat is awarded to the party or coalition with the second most votes.
- Thirty-two (32) senators are elected by party-list proportional representation on a nationwide basis.

Candidates for the Senate must be registered voters at least 25 years old. They must also have been born in or resided in the states they are running in for at least six months.

==== Other restrictions ====
Electoral magistrates, the secretary of the Electoral Tribunal of the Federal Judiciary, and the executive secretary and executive director of the INE must separate themselves from their positions for at least three years before seeking legislative office.

== State and Mexico City elections ==
Mexico has 32 federative entities (Spanish: entidades federativas), including 31 states and Mexico City. Each federative entity elects its head of the executive (governor or head of government) and all legislative members (congress).

=== Gubernatorial and head of government elections ===
The leader of a federative entity is officially named governor (Spanish: gobernador) for a Mexican state and head of government (Spanish: jefe/jefa de Gobierno) for Mexico City. These officials are elected for a six-year non-renewable term by the citizens of that federative entity.

To be a governor or head of government:

- Candidates born in the federative entity must have been residents for three years before the election.
- Candidates born outside the federative entity must have been residents for five years before the election.
- Candidates must be at least 30 years old.
- Candidates cannot have been a minister of any religion for five years before the election.
- Candidates cannot have been in the military or a head of public security forces for 90 days before the election.
- Candidates cannot have citizenship in any country other than Mexico.

=== Congressional elections ===
Each federative entity has a unicameral legislature officially named Congress (Spanish: Congreso). Members of the congresses are called deputies (Spanish: diputados). All seats of the Congress are elected to three-year terms in a mixed electoral system. Deputies can serve up to four consecutive terms (non-consecutive starting in 2030).

For example, there are 75 seats in the Congress of the State of México. Forty-five seats are apportioned in direct elections in single-member districts, and 30 are apportioned via proportional appointments. Political parties nominate their candidates for proportional appointments before the election. For a party to be eligible for proportional-appointment seats, it must run candidates in at least 30 districts and receive at least 3% of the vote throughout the state.

Similar to the federal Chamber of Deputies, a party cannot have more than 8% of the seats in the legislature above its percentage of statewide votes (e.g., to win 50% of the legislative seats, a party must win at least 42% of the vote statewide) unless that excess was earned in the direct elections.

To be a deputy of the Congress:

- Candidates born in the federative entity must have been residents for one year before the election.
- Candidates born outside the federative entity must have been residents for three years before the election.
- Candidates must be at least 21 years old.
- Candidates cannot have been a minister of any religion for five years before the election.
- Candidates cannot have worked for any election commission for two years before the election.
- Candidates cannot have been a sitting municipal or federal legislator for 90 days before the election.
- Candidates cannot have been a sitting judge for 90 days before the election.
- Candidates cannot have been in the military or a head of public security forces for 90 days before the election.
- Candidates cannot be a sitting governor.

== Municipal and borough elections ==
Under the current administrative divisions of Mexico, states are divided into municipalities, and Mexico City is divided into boroughs. The autonomy of these divisions is protected by the Constitution of Mexico. Leaders of these divisions, called municipal presidents (Spanish: presidentes municipales) or borough mayors (Spanish: alcaldes), are directly elected for a three-year once-renewable term (non-consecutive starting in 2030). As of March 2024, there are 2,461 municipalities and 16 boroughs, constituting 2,477 electoral territorial units.

== Schedule ==
Recent rotation of Mexican elections
Year	2018	2019	2020	2021	2022	2023	2024
Type	General	Off-year	Off-year	Midterm	Off-year	Off-year	General
President	Yes	No					Yes
Senate of the Republic	All 128 Seats	No					All 128 Seats
Chamber of Deputies	All 500 Seats	No		All 500 Seats	No		All 500 Seats
Governor	8 states & CDMX; Chis., CDMX, Gto., Jal., Mor., Pue., Tab., Ver., Yuc.	2 states B.C., Pue. (special)	None	15 states B.C., B.C.S., Camp., Chih., Col., Gro., Mich., Nay., N.L., Qro., S.L.P., Sin., Son., Tlax., Zac.	6 states Ags., Dgo., Hgo., Oax., Q.Roo, Tamps.	2 states Coah., Méx.	8 states & CDMX; Chis., Gto., Jal., CDMX, Mor., Pue., Tab., Ver., Yuc.
State Congress	27 states & CDMX; Ags., B.C.S., Camp., Chis., Chih., CDMX, Col., Dgo., Gto., Gro., Hgo., Jal., Méx., Mich., Mor., Nay., N.L., Oax., Pue., Qro., S.L.P., Sin., Son., Tab., Tlax., Ver., Yuc., Zac.	3 states B.C., Q.Roo, Tamps.	1 state Coah.	29 states & CDMX; Ags., B.C., B.C.S., Camp., Chis., Chih., CDMX, Col., Dgo., Gto., Gro., Hgo., Jal., Méx., Mich., Mor., Nay., N.L., Oax., Pue., Qro., S.L.P., Sin., Son., Tab., Tamps., Tlax., Ver., Yuc., Zac.	1 state Q.Roo	1 state Coah.	30 states & CDMX; Ags., B.C., B.C.S., Camp., Chis., Chih., CDMX, Col., Dgo., Gto., Gro., Hgo., Jal., Méx., Mich., Mor., Nay., N.L., Oax., Pue., Qro., Q.Roo, S.L.P., Sin., Son., Tab., Tamps., Tlax., Ver., Yuc., Zac.

=== Federal elections ===
- 2024 Mexican general election (Presidential, Senate, Chamber of Deputies)
- 2021 Mexican legislative election (Chamber of Deputies)
- 2018 Mexican general election (Presidential, Senate, Chamber of Deputies)
- 2015 Mexican legislative election (Chamber of Deputies)
- 2012 Mexican general election (Presidential, Senate, Chamber of Deputies)
- 2009 Mexican legislative election (Chamber of Deputies)

=== State elections ===
- 2024 Mexican local elections
- 2023 Mexican local elections
- 2022 Mexican local elections
- 2021 Mexican local elections
- 2020 Mexican local elections
- 2019 Baja California state election
- 2019 Puebla special elections

== See also ==
- Electoral system
- Elections in the United States
