= Couttolenc =

Couttolenc is a surname. Notable people with the surname include:

- Gustavo Couttolenc (1921–2015), Mexican writer
- Michelle Couttolenc, Mexican sound engineer
- Myriam Arabian Couttolenc (born 1960), Mexican politician

== See also ==
- Coutolenc, California, a former settlement in Butte County, California
