= Lydia Cacho =

Mexican journalist, feminist, and human rights activist

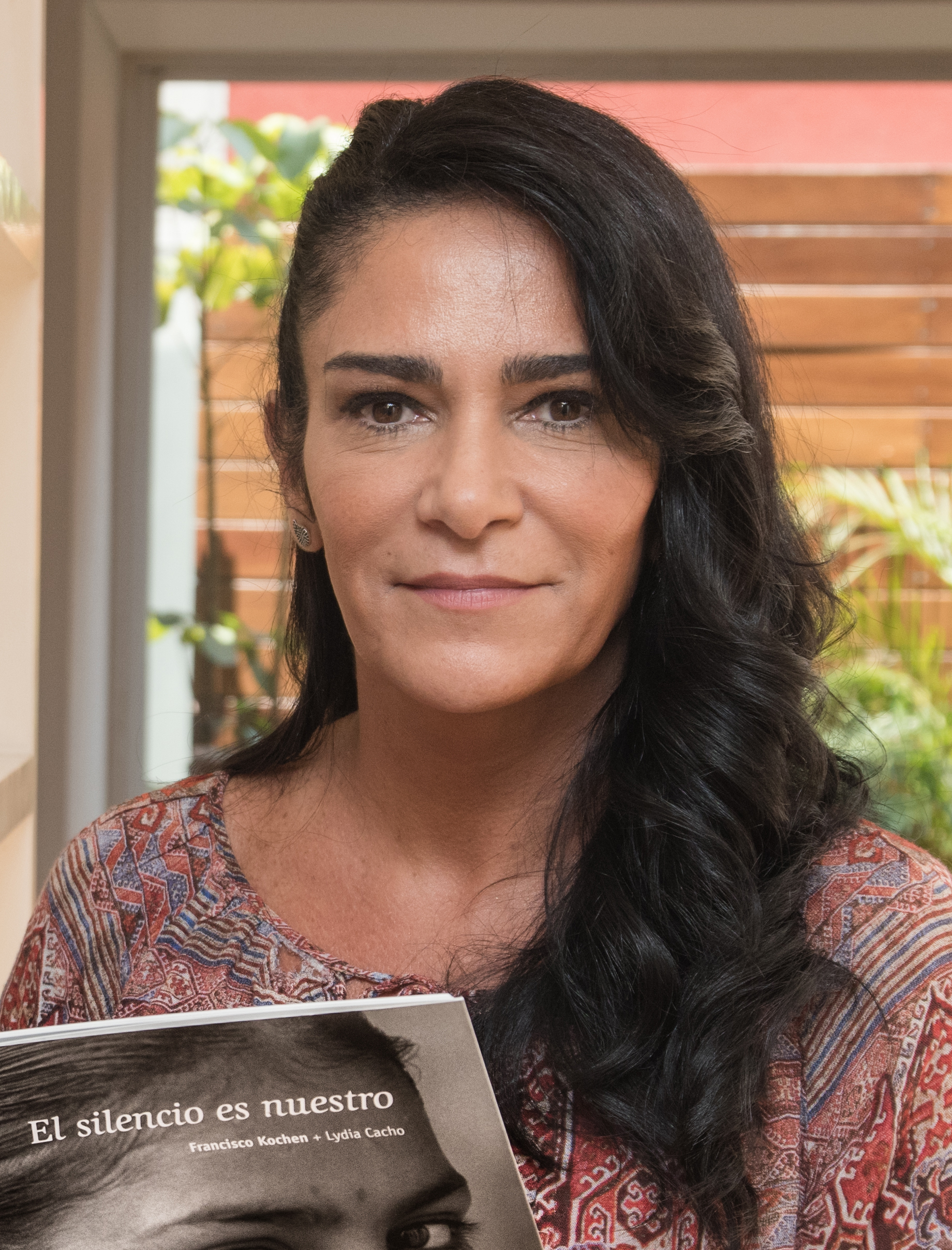
- Cacho in 2015
- Born: Lydia María Cacho Ribeiro; 12 April 1963 (age 63); Mexico City, Mexico
- Occupation: Journalist
- Organization: Red Internacional de Periodistas con Visión de Género
- Awards: Ginetta Sagan Award (2007); UNESCO/Guillermo Cano World Press Freedom Prize (2008); Olof Palme Prize (2011)

Lydia María Cacho Ribeiro (born 12 April 1963) is a Mexican journalist, feminist, and human rights activist. Described by Amnesty International as "perhaps Mexico's most famous investigative journalist and women's rights advocate", Cacho's reporting focuses on violence against and sexual abuse of women and children.

Her book Los Demonios del Edén (in English: The Demons of Eden) (2004) created a nationwide scandal by alleging that several prominent businessmen had conspired to protect a pedophilia ring. In 2006, a tape emerged of a conversation between businessman Kamel Nacif Borge and Mario Plutarco Marín Torres, governor of Puebla, in which they conspired to have Cacho beaten and raped for her reporting. Marín Torres was arrested for the alleged torture on 3 February 2021.

Cacho is the winner of numerous international awards for her journalism, including the Civil Courage Prize, the Wallenberg Medal, and the Olof Palme Prize. In 2010, she was named a World Press Freedom Hero of the International Press Institute.

== Background ==
Lydia Cacho Ribeiro was born in Mexico City to a mother of French-Portuguese origin who moved from France to Mexico during World War II and a Mexican engineer father. Cacho attributed her refusal to compromise to her mother, who was shocked by what she called Mexicans' willingness to "negotiate their dignity in exchange for apparent freedom". Her mother also taught her social awareness by taking Cacho along for grassroots community projects into poor neighborhoods. Cacho credits her father with teaching her discipline and toughness.

Cacho lived briefly in Paris as a young woman, studying at the Sorbonne and working as a maid. At age 23, she nearly died from kidney failure. After her recovery, she began working for Cancún newspapers, writing arts and entertainment stories. However, guided by her mother's feminism, Cacho soon began writing about violence against women.

Shortly afterwards, in 1999, she was assaulted and raped by a man in a bus station bathroom who broke several of her bones. Cacho believes that the attack was a retaliation for her investigations. She continued her investigations, however, and the following year founded a shelter for battered women.

== Los Demonios del Edén ==
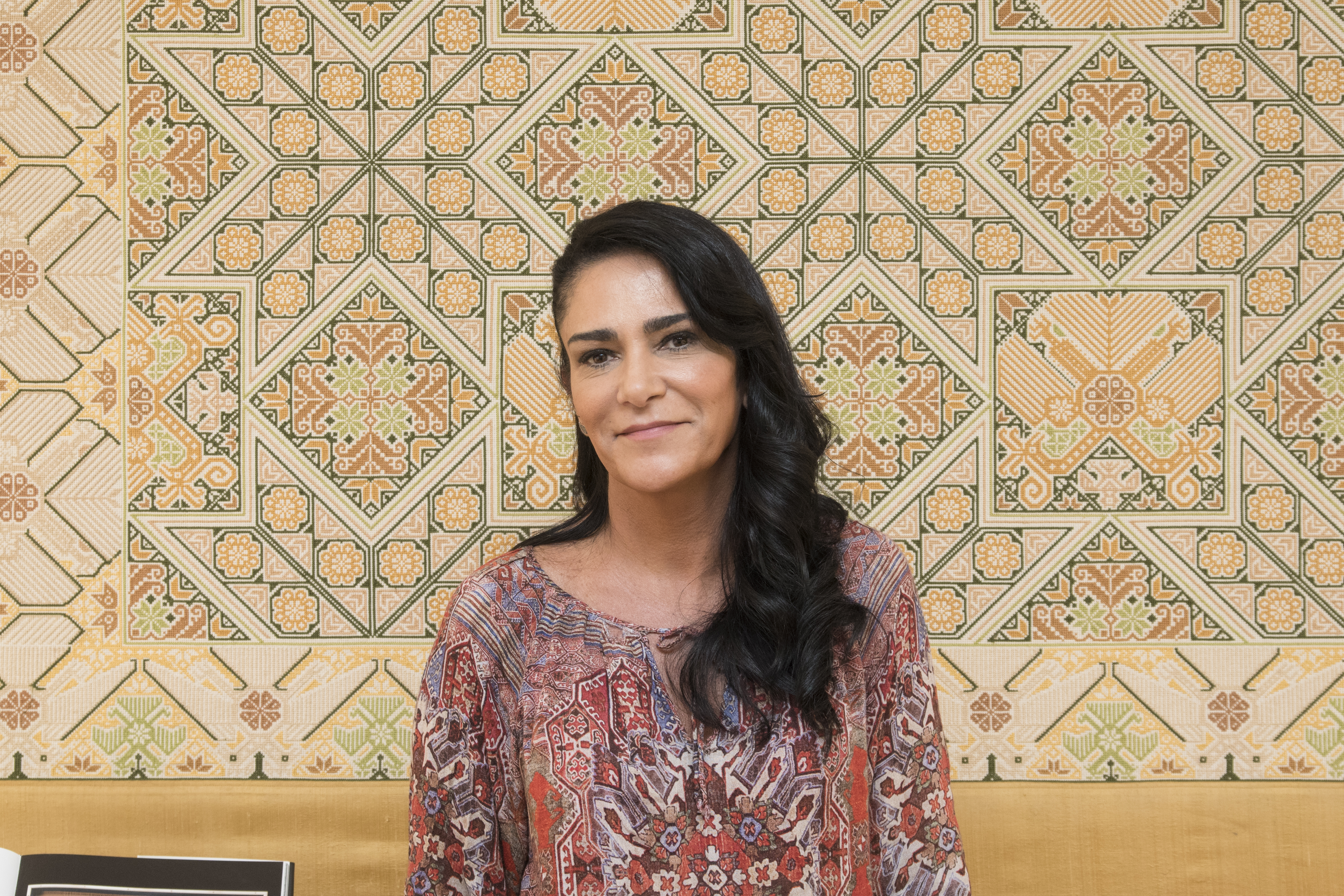
Lydia María Cacho Ribeiro

In 2003, Cacho wrote articles on the sexual abuse of minors for the newspaper Por Esto including a note on a girl abused by a local hotel owner, Jean Succar Kuri. Feeling that the local police had failed to act on the girl's complaint, the following year, Cacho published the book Los Demonios del Edén (in English: "Demons of Eden") in which she accuses Kuri of being involved in a ring of child pornography and prostitution, based on official statements from his alleged victims and even a video of him (filmed with hidden camera). The book also mentions important politicians Emilio Gamboa Patrón and Miguel Ángel Yunes as involved, and accuses Kamel Nacif Borge, a Puebla businessman, of protecting Succar Kuri.

After the book's release, Cacho was arrested in Cancún by Puebla police and driven back to Puebla, 900 miles away. Cacho has stated that the arresting officers verbally abused her and hinted there was a plan to rape her. She was then imprisoned for a short time on defamation charges before being released on bail.

On 14 February 2006, several telephone conversations between Nacif Borge and Mario Marín, governor of the state of Puebla, were revealed by the Mexico City daily La Jornada. In these conversations, before Cacho's arrest, Marín and Nacif Borge discussed putting Cacho in jail as a favour, and having her beaten and abused while in jail to silence her. The recording sparked widespread calls for Marín to be impeached.

Cacho took the case of her arrest to the Supreme Court, becoming the first woman in Mexico's history to testify there. On 29 November 2007, the Court ruled 6 to 4 that Marín had no case to answer in Cacho's arrest, jailing and harassment, a case that The New York Times described as "a setback for journalistic freedom in Mexico".

The United Nations Human Rights Council advised her to leave the country, recommended that she seek political asylum in another country, and offered her legal assistance and assistance in gaining access to international courts. While being held, Cacho was granted the Premio Francisco Ojeda al Valor Periodístico (Francisco Ojeda Award for Journalistic Courage).

In May 2008, a few days before she was scheduled to testify at Kuri's trial, Cacho was almost killed when the lug nuts on one of her car's wheels were loosened.

== Reporting on Femicides in Ciudad Juárez ==
In 2006, Cacho reported on the hundreds of female homicides in Ciudad Juárez.

In 2020, Cacho was the host and executive producer of a bilingual podcast produced by Imperative Entertainment and Blue Guitar about the femicide in Juárez. The podcast was released in English as The Red Note and in Spanish as La Nota Roja. A documentary on the same topic, entitled "Flowers of the Desert: Stories from the Red Note," is scheduled to be released by Imperative Entertainment in 2021.

== Awards and honors ==
In 2007, Lydia Cacho received the Amnesty International Ginetta Sagan Award for Women and Children's Rights, the IWMF (International Women's Media Foundation) Courage in Journalism Award, and the Oxfam Novib/PEN Award. The following year, she received the UNESCO/Guillermo Cano World Press Freedom Prize.

In 2009, Cacho was awarded the Wallenberg Medal from the University of Michigan for her work to bring to public attention to the corruption that shields criminals who exploit women and children. Cacho was a recipient of the PEN/Pinter Prize as an International Writer of Courage in 2010, which goes to writers persecuted for their beliefs. She was also named a World Press Freedom Hero of the International Press Institute.

A year later, Cacho received The International Hrant Dink Award, presented to people who work for a world free of discrimination, racism and violence, take personal risks for their ideals, use the language of peace and by doing so, inspire and encourage others. She also won the Civil Courage Prize of The Train Foundation, which she shared with Triveni Acharya for efforts against "sex trafficking, domestic violence and child pornography", and the Olof Palme Prize together with Roberto Saviano.

In 2017, Cacho was awarded the Distinguished Leadership Award for the Defense of Human Rights by the Inter-American Dialogue.

== Publications ==
As of 2018, Lydia Cacho has written twelve books, ranging from poetry to fiction, and including a Manual to prevent child abuse, essays on gender issues and love, and her international best sellers about Sex trafficking, Human Slavery and the relationship between child pornography and child sexual abuse like Slavery Inc.: The Untold Story of International Sex Trafficking, published in the U.K. Her books have been translated into French, English, Dutch, Portuguese, Italian, German, Croatian, Swedish, and Turkish.

- 2003, Muérdele al corazón / Bite the heart , DEMAC, Spanish, ASIN B01FEOIYJK
- 2007, Esta boca es mía…y tuya también / This mouth is mine… and Yours too , Planeta Mexicana, Spanish, ISBN 978-97-037-0676-1
- 2009, Con mi hij@ NO / With my child NO , Debolsillo, Spanish, ISBN 978-60-742-9086-8
- 2010, Esclavas del Poder: Trata sexual / Slaves Of Power , Grijalbo Mondadori, Spanish, ISBN 978-60-731-0003-8
- 2010, Los demonios del Edén / The Demons of Eden , Debolsillo, Spanish, ISBN 978-60-731-0734-1
- 2013, El silencio es nuestro / The silence is ours , Artes de México y del Mundo, Spanish, ISBN 978-60-746-1138-0
- 2014, Slavery Inc.: The Untold Story of International Sex Trafficking , Soft Skull Press, English, ISBN 978-1619022966
- 2015, En busca de Kayla / In search of Kayla , Lydia Cacho y Patricio Betteo, Editorial Sexto Piso, ilustrado, Spanish, ISBN 978-60-794-3618-6
- 2016, Infamy , Soft Skull Press, English, ISBN 978-15-937-6643-6
- 2016, La ira de México / The wrath of Mexico , Editorial Debate, Spanish, ISBN 978-60-731-5025-5
- 2017, The sorrows of Mexico , Maclehose Press, English, ISBN 978-08-570-5622-1
- 2017, Ciberespías al rescate: en busca de Sam / Cyberspies to the rescue: In search of Sam , Spanish, ASIN B076DNC2XB

== See also ==
- Censorship in Mexico#Attacks and threats against journalists
- Human rights in Mexico
- List of journalists and media workers killed in Mexico
