= Mario Mellado García =

Governor of Puebla
- In office March 23, 1972 – April 14, 1972
- Preceded by: Rafael Moreno Valle
- Succeeded by: Gonzalo Bautista O'Farrill

Personal details
- Died: October 2014
- Party: PRI

Mario Mellado García (died October 2014) was a Mexican lawyer, politician and judge. Mellado served as the acting Governor of Puebla from March 23, 1972, until April 14, 1972, following the resignation of Governor Rafael Moreno Valle. Mellado, a lawyer and judge, served as the Secretary General of the Government of Puebla from 1969 to 1972. He was also the President of the Tribunal Superior de Justicia del Estado de Puebla for several terms: 1972–1975, 1975-1981 and 1984–1993.

In March 1972, then Puebla Governor Rafael Moreno Valle resigned from office. Mario Mellado García became acting Governor of Puebla from March 23, 1972, to April 14, 1972, until the Congress of Puebla chose a successor, Gonzalo Bautista O'Farrill, as the new state governor.

Mellado resided in a small home in la colonia Anzures. He kept an exercise regimen and reportedly swam every morning at 6 a.m. until about 2004. He lived in a nursing home during the final months of his life.

Mario Mellado García died in October 2014. His remains were cremated at 31 Poniente.

Political offices
Preceded by Rafael Moreno Valle	Governor of Puebla; 1972 – 1972	Succeeded by Gonzalo Bautista O'Farrill
