= Néstor Octavio Gordillo Castillo =

Mexican politician

- Born: 26 February 1962 (age 64); Chiapas, Mexico
- Occupation: Politician
- Political party: PAN

Néstor Octavio Gordillo Castillo (born 26 February 1962) is a Mexican politician affiliated with the National Action Party (PAN). In the 2012 general election he was elected to the Chamber of Deputies to represent Puebla's 12th district during the 62nd session of Congress.
