= List of municipal presidents of Puebla =

The Municipal President of Puebla (mayor) is the head of local government in the municipality of Puebla, in the Mexican state of Puebla. The mayor's authority includes the state capital, the city of Puebla. Since the city serves as the municipal seat and is home to the majority of the municipality's population, the position of municipal president is frequently identified with the city, rather than the municipality.

== List of municipal presidents of Puebla ==
- 1945–1948: Antonio Arellano Garrido
- 1948–1951: Enrique Milina Jhonson
- 1951–1954: Nicolás Vázquez Arriola
- 1954–1957: Arturo Perdomo Morán
- 1957–1960: Rafael Artasanchez Romero
- 1957–1960: Francisco Rodríguez Pacheco
- 1960–1963: Eduardo Cué Merlo
- 1963–1966: Carlos Vergara Soto
- 1966–1969: Arcadio Medel Marín
- 1969–1972: Carlos J. Arruti y Ramírez
- 1972: Gonzalo Bautista O'Farrill
- 1972–1975: Luis Vázquez Lapuente
- 1975–1978: Eduardo Cué Merlo
- 1978–1981: Miguel Quiróz Pérez
- 1981–1984: Victoriano Álvarez García
- 1984–1987: Amado Camarillo Sánchez
- 1984–1987: Jorge Murad Macluf
- 1987–1990: Guillermo Pacheco Pulido
- 1990–1993: Marco Antonio Rojas Flores
- 1993–1996: Rafael Cañedo Benítez
- 1996–1999: Gabriel Hinojosa Rivero
- 1999–2002: Mario Marín Torres
- 2002–2005: Luis Jesús Paredes Moctezuma
- 2005–2008: Enrique Doger Guerrero
- 2008–2011: Blanca Alcalá Ruiz
- 2011–2014: Eduardo Rivera Pérez
- 2018–2021: Claudia Rivera Vivanco

== See also ==
- Timeline of Puebla
