= Blanca Alcalá =

Mexican politician

Blanca Alcalá Ruiz
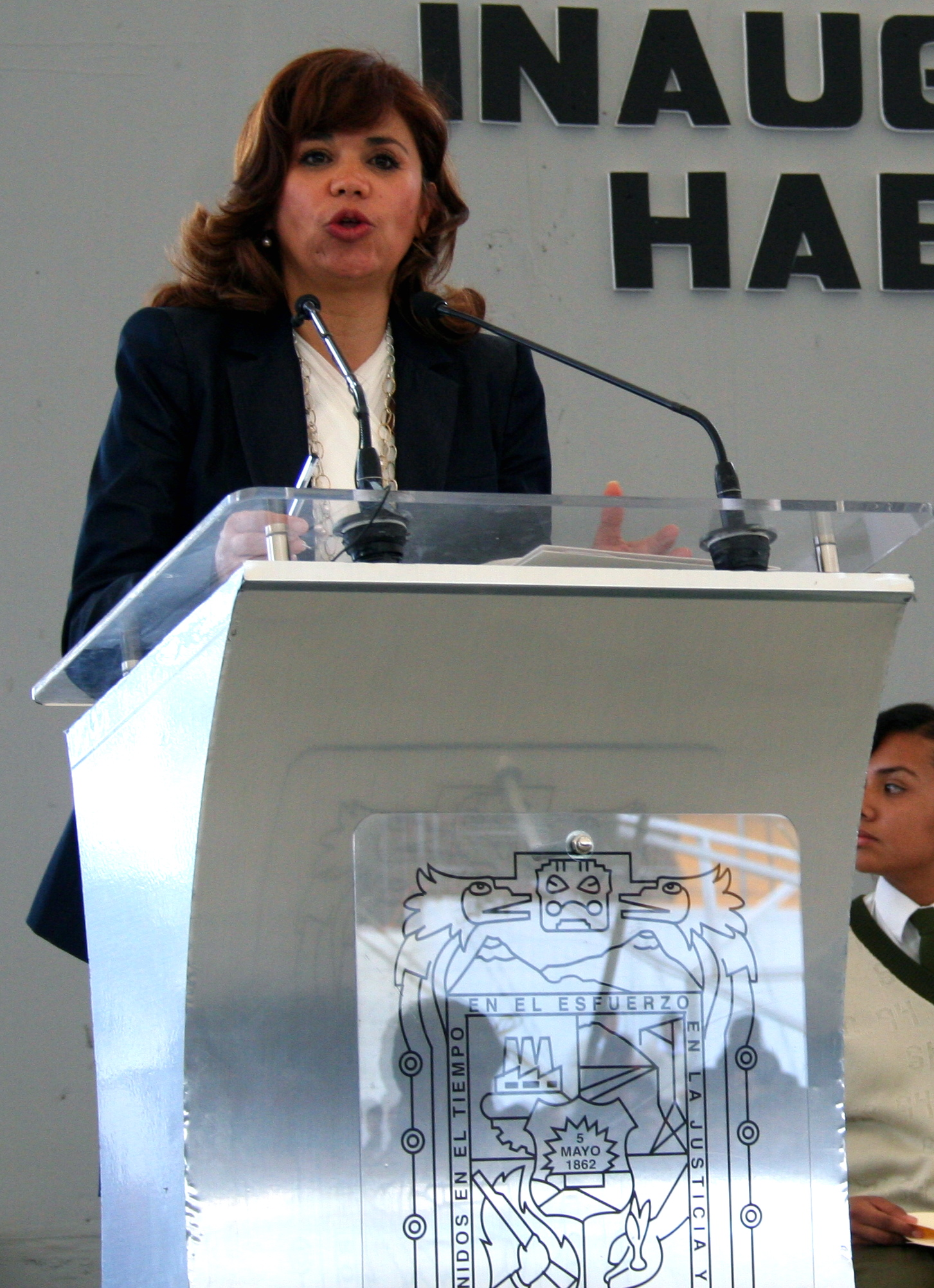
- Alcalá speaking at the "Inauguracion del aula del programa hablidades digitales para todos 'HDT-Cisco'" in Puebla on 15 April 2010
- Born: 8 October 1961 (age 65); Tlaxcala de Xicohténcatl, Tlaxcala, Mexico
- Education: Universidad de las Américas Puebla; Instituto de Administración Pública, Veracruz
- Occupation: Politician

Blanca Alcalá Ruiz (Note: In this Mexican name, the surname is Alcalá and the second or maternal family name is Ruiz.) (born 8 October 1961) is a Mexican politician. From 2008 to 2011, she served as the mayor of Puebla, the capital city of the state of Puebla. She was the first female mayor in the history of the city. In August 2017 she was named Ambassador to Colombia.

== Early life and education ==
Alcalá was born in the city of Tlaxcala. She earned a BA in international relations from Universidad de las Américas Puebla (UDLAP) and an MA in public administration from Instituto de Administración Pública, Veracruz, where she is also a PhD candidate.

== Political career ==
- Mexican Ambassador to Colombia
- Senator of the Republic LXII and LXIII legislature
- Mayor of Puebla, 2008-2011 term (First woman elected)
- Head of Ministry of Finance of 1998–1999. (First woman)
- General Delegate of the National Bank of Public Works and Services.
- Regional Development Deputy Secretary of Social Development.
- Secretary of Social Development
- Director of Foreign Trade and Foreign Investment of the Ministry of Economy of Puebla Government 1993–1995.
- Undersecretary of SEDECAP
- General Director of the State for Family Development.
- General Director of the Institute of Women at Puebla.
- President of the Southern Region of the National Federation of Municipalities of Mexico (FENAMM).
- President of the Mexican Association of World Heritage Cities 2009.
- Local Representative of H. LIII Legislature State Congress.
- CEN Deputy PRI in the state of Colima.
- Deputy General Secretary of the CNOP CEN.
- General Secretary of the State Executive Committee of the PRI.
- President of Municipal Committee of PRI in Puebla.
- Member of the Political Council and Municipal State. Undersecretary of State Steering Committee Organization. PRI
- Deputy Director of the Center for Political, Economic and Social.
- Delegate District and Municipal Police.
- Director of the National Association of Revolutionary Women Organization (ANFER).
- Active member of the Institutional Revolutionary Party since 1981.

== Notes ==
Preceded by Enrique Doger Guerrero	Mayor of Puebla; 2008-2011	Succeeded by Eduardo Rivera Pérez
