= Sergio Salomón Céspedes =

Mexican politician

Governor of Puebla
- Substitute
- In office 15 December 2022 – 13 December 2024
- Preceded by: Miguel Barbosa Huerta
- Succeeded by: Alejandro Armenta Mier

Deputy to the LXI Congress of Puebla for the 18th district
- In office 17 September 2021 – 15 December 2022

Municipal President of Tepeaca
- In office 15 October 2018 – 4 September 2021

Deputy to the LIX Congress of Puebla for the 13th district
- In office 15 January 2014 – 14 September 2018

Personal details
- Born: Sergio Salomón Céspedes Peregrina; 18 April 1969 (age 57) Tepeaca, Puebla, Mexico
- Party: PRI (1986–2018); MC (2018–2021); MORENA (2021–present)
- Education: Universidad del Valle de Puebla
- Occupation: Lawyer, restaurateur

Sergio Salomón Céspedes Peregrina (born 18 April 1969) is a Mexican politician affiliated with Morena and substitute Governor of Puebla from 2022 to 2024. He was named by the Congress of Puebla to succeed the deceased Miguel Barbosa Huerta.

== Political career ==
Prior to becoming a member of Morena, Céspedes was a member of the Institutional Revolutionary Party (PRI) and Movimiento Ciudadano. He twice served as a deputy to the Congress of Puebla from districts incorporating his hometown of Tepeaca, having been elected to serve from 2014 to 2018 and again in 2021; in between, he was Tepeaca's municipal president, running as the Movimiento Ciudadano candidate. In the legislature, he was the leader of the Morena majority, having switched to that party in his second legislative campaign, and presided over the Government and Political Coordination Board. He was also recognized as one of the defenders of policies proposed by governor Miguel Barbosa Huerta.

=== Governor ===
On 13 December 2022, Barbosa died; Céspedes Peregrina was part of his inner circle. Early on 15 December, the legislature appointed Céspedes on a 38–1 vote to serve as substitute governor until 13 December 2024; he took indefinite leave from the legislature. Céspedes had previously been noted as Barbosa's preferred gubernatorial contender in 2024 and was the first candidate to publicly declare his interest, but the appointment renders him ineligible for election. The state legislature, in which Morena holds a majority, made the appointment despite criticism from national party president Mario Martín Delgado, who issued a statement decrying the fact that proceedings to name a substitute governor were in motion before Barbosa was buried.

== Personal life ==
Céspedes owns a restaurant business. Between 2013 and 2016, he obtained a law degree from the Universidad del Valle de Puebla. He has a wife and daughters.

Céspedes is a Rotarian, having been a president and secretary in Tepeaca's local Rotary club.
