= Jesús Rodríguez Almeida =

Mexican politician (born 1971)

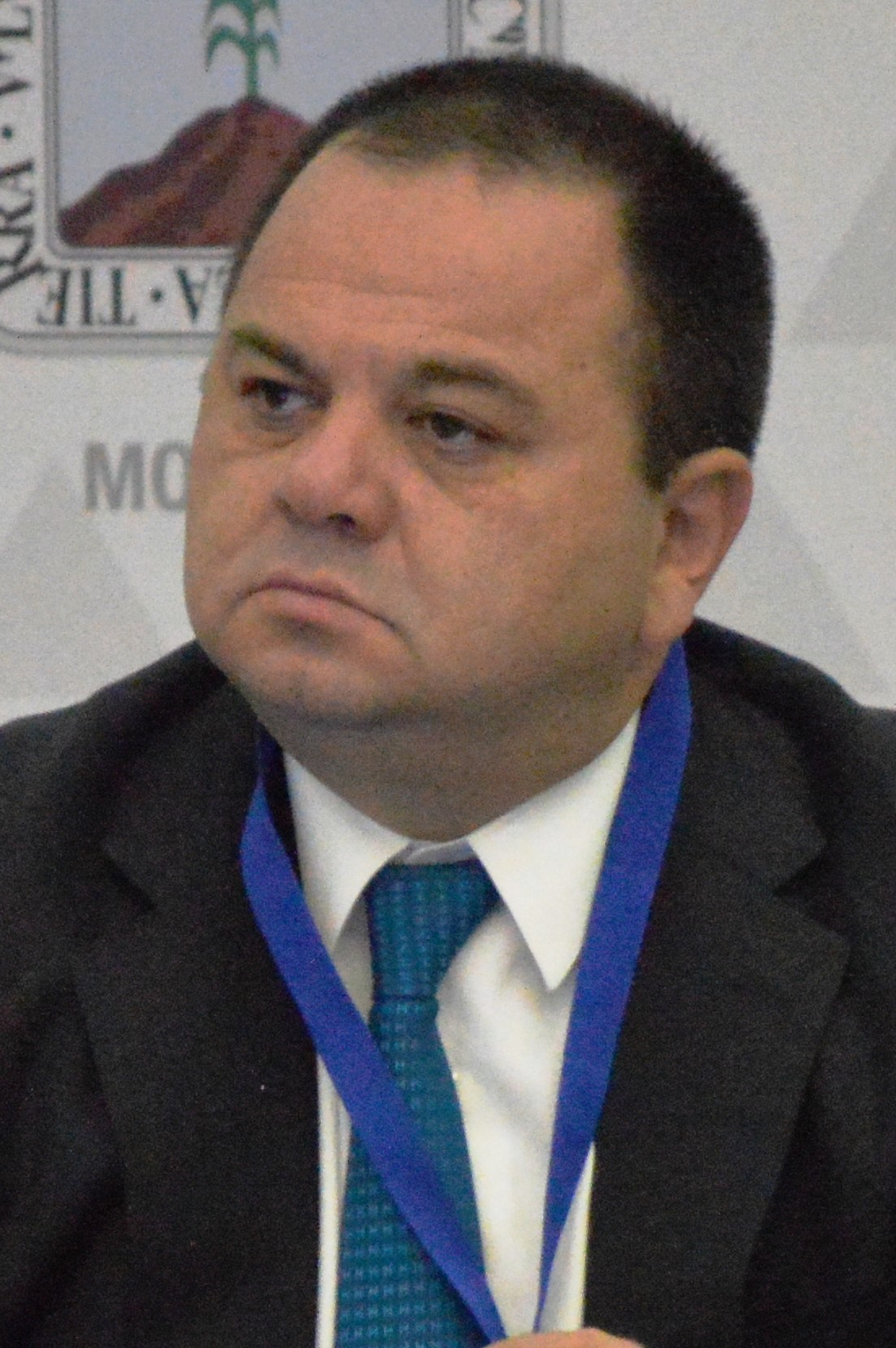

Governor of Puebla Interim
- In office 24 December 2018 – 21 January 2019
- Preceded by: Martha Erika Alonso
- Succeeded by: Guillermo Pacheco Pulido

Personal details
- Born: 24 November 1971 (age 54) Mexico City
- Party: National Action Party
- Occupation: Lawyer

Jesús Rodríguez Almeida (born 24 November 1971) is a Mexican politician. He served as Interim Governor of Puebla from 24 December 2018 to 21 January 2019. He became interim governor when Martha Erika Alonso Hidalgo died in the 2018 Puebla helicopter crash. On 21 January 2019 the Congress of Puebla elected Guillermo Pacheco Pulido as the new Acting Governor of Puebla.
