= Jean Succar Kuri =

Lebanese-Mexican criminal (1944–2024)

- Born: September 19, 1944; Bsharri, Lebanon
- Died: June 14, 2024 (aged 79); Cancún, Quintana Roo, Mexico
- Status: Deceased
- Criminal charges: Child pornography and Child sex trafficking
- Penalty: 112 years

Jean Thouma Hannah Succar Kuri (September 19, 1944 – June 14, 2024) was a Lebanese-born Mexican criminal convicted of child pornography and child sexual abuse in Cancún, Quintana Roo. He was sentenced to 112 years in prison on August 31, 2011.

On August 19, 1975, Succar arrived in the state of Guanajuato with relatives of his, and then relocated to Cancún, which was seeing an explosion in the tourist industry. He then married, divorced, and remarried an 18-year-old woman, the mother of his five children. He saw his empire grow from a soda stand to a group of four villas, 70 hotel rooms, and one hotel. His fortune was estimated to be 30 million dollars.

After the publication of the expose Los Demonios del Edén (Demons of Eden) by Lydia Cacho, he was associated with Puebla-based Lebanese businessman Kamel Nacif Borge in a sexual exploitation ring. In 2004, he was detained in Chandler, Arizona, and extradited to Mexico by a request of the attorney general and Interpol. He was accused of child pornography, child sexual abuse, and statutory rape. He was finally sentenced to 112 years in prison on charges of child pornography and corruption of minors. According to Mexican law, he would have to serve minimum 60 years of that sentence.

Kuri died due to a heart problem in Cancún, on June 14, 2024, at the age of 79.
