= Leobardo Soto =

Mexican politician

Leobardo Soto Martínez
- Born: 18 January 1971 (age 55); Puebla, Mexico
- Occupation: Politician
- Political party: PRI

Leobardo Soto Martínez (born 18 January 1971) is a Mexican politician from the Institutional Revolutionary Party (PRI). In the 2009 mid-terms he was elected to the Chamber of Deputies to represent Puebla's 12th district during the 61st session of Congress (2009 to 2012).
