= Rafael Moreno Valle =

Mexican politician

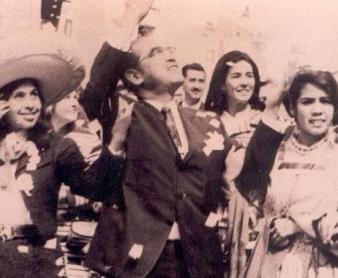
- Rafael Moreno Valle with family in 1971

Governor of Puebla
- In office February 1, 1969 – March 23, 1972
- Preceded by: Aarón Merino Fernández
- Succeeded by: Mario Mellado García

Secretary of Health
- In office December 1, 1964 – 1968
- President: Gustavo Díaz Ordaz
- Preceded by: José Álvarez Amézquita
- Succeeded by: Salvador Aceves Parra

Member of the Senate of the Republic
- In office September 1, 1958 – August 31, 1964
- Preceded by: Guillermo Castillo Fernández
- Succeeded by: Eduardo Cué Merlo

Personal details
- Born: August 13, 1917 Atlixco, Puebla, Mexico
- Died: February 13, 2016 (aged 98) Mexico City
- Party: Institutional Revolutionary Party

Rafael Moreno Valle (August 13, 1917 – February 13, 2016) was a Mexican military physician and politician. A member of PRI, he served as the Governor of Puebla from 1969 to 1974, as well as the Secretary of Health from 1964 to 1968 under President Gustavo Díaz Ordaz. He was also a founding member of the Sociedad Mexicana de Traumatología y Ortopedia.

Moreno was the grandfather of Rafael Moreno Valle Rosas, who served as the governor of Puebla from 2011 to 2018.

== Biography ==
Moreno Valle was born in the city of Atlixco, Puebla, on August 13, 1917. He completed his early schooling in Atlixco. He graduated from Escuela Médico Militar, the Mexican Army medical school, in 1940. He then worked at the Carrie Tingley Hospital in the U.S. state of New Mexico from 1941 to 1942. He then became the first Mexican to serve as a chief resident at Charity Hospital in New Orleans, Louisiana. He studied at Tulane University, beginning in 1945, where he specialized in orthopedics.

Moreno Valle taught as an adjunct profession of Trauma and Orthopedics at the Escuela Médico Militar, as well as the Escuela Militar de Enfermería. He was appointed the director of the Hospital Central Militar Mexico in 1946. In 1952, he rose to the rank of brigadier general.

In 1958, Moreno was elected to the Senate of the Republic from the state of Puebla. He served in the XLIV and XLV Legislatures of Mexico from 1958 to 1964. Moreno Valle was appointed federal Secretary of Health under President Gustavo Díaz Ordaz from 1964 to 1968.

Moreno Valle, a member of the ruling PRI party, served as the governor of Puebla from 1969 to 1972.

In 2015, the National Public Health Council of Mexico awarded Moreno Valle the Mérito Médico Guillermo Soberón Acevedo de Desarrollo de Instituciones award. That same year, the Hospital de Traumatología y Ortopedia of Puebla added his name to the institution in recognition of his service to the hospital.

Rafael Moreno Valle died on February 13, 2016, at his home in the Chimalistac neighborhood of Mexico City at the age of 98.

Political offices
Preceded by Aarón Merino Fernández	Governor of Puebla; 1969 – 1972	Succeeded by Mario Mellado García
Preceded by José Álvarez Amézquita	Secretary of Health; 1964 – 1968	Succeeded by Salvador Aceves Parra
