= José Antonio Gali Fayad =

Mexican politician (born 1959)

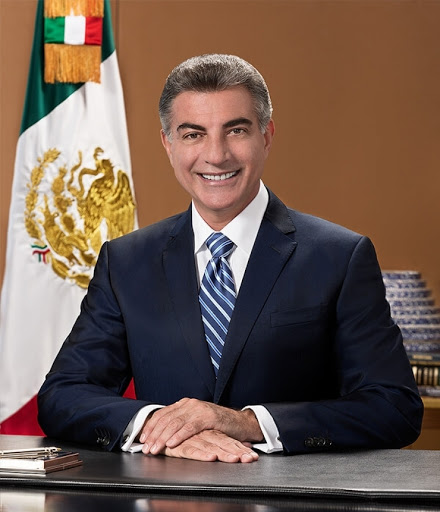

Governor of Puebla
- In office 1 February 2017 – 13 December 2018
- Preceded by: Rafael Moreno Valle
- Succeeded by: Martha Erika Alonso

Personal details
- Born: November 25, 1959 (age 66) Puebla, Puebla, Mexico
- Party: National Action Party
- Spouse: Alma Dinorah López Gargallo
- Occupation: Governor of Puebla

José Antonio Gali Fayad (Spanish pronunciation: [xoˈse anˈtonjo ˈɣali faˈʝað]; born November 25, 1959) is a Mexican politician affiliated to the National Action Party (PAN). He was the governor of Puebla and previously served as the municipal president of Puebla from 2014 to 2016.

== Life ==
Gali was born the oldest of six siblings. While in high school, he met his wife, Alma Dinorah López Gargallo; they married in 1982 and have three children. He studied economics and international relations at the Universidad de las Américas Puebla and obtained his master's and doctorate degrees in administration from the National Public Administration Institute. Gali then went to work in the textile industry, managing several companies, and later as an advisor and auditor; he also served as the deputy director of Cine de las Américas and the director of the Red Nacional Canal 13.

From 2011 to 2013, Gali served as Secretary of Infrastructure in the state government under Rafael Moreno Valle Rosas.

=== Municipal presidency ===
In 2013, Gali left the cabinet to run for municipal president of Puebla, a candidacy backed by the PAN, PRD, Nueva Alianza, and Compromiso por Puebla, a state party, as the Puebla Unida ("Puebla United") coalition. His candidacy was challenged by a fellow PAN member who claimed Gali had started his campaign too early, but the TEPJF dismissed the case. He was elected by voters on July 7 and took office on February 15, 2014.

=== Gubernatorial election ===
Gali stepped down as mayor on February 19, 2016, in order to run for governor on behalf of the coalition Sigamos Adelante (Let's Move Forward), composed of the PAN, PRD, MC, PT, Nueva Alianza, and two state parties, Compromiso por Puebla and Pacto Social de Integración. Proposals included a reduction of state corporate income tax from 3 to 2 percent, the creation of a new transparency committee, and promises to seek direct flights between Puebla and Europe.

In the June 5 elections, Gali received 45.1 percent of the vote, ahead of the PRI coalition candidate with 33 percent.
