= 2018 Puebla helicopter crash =

Accident that killed the Governor of Puebla, Mexico

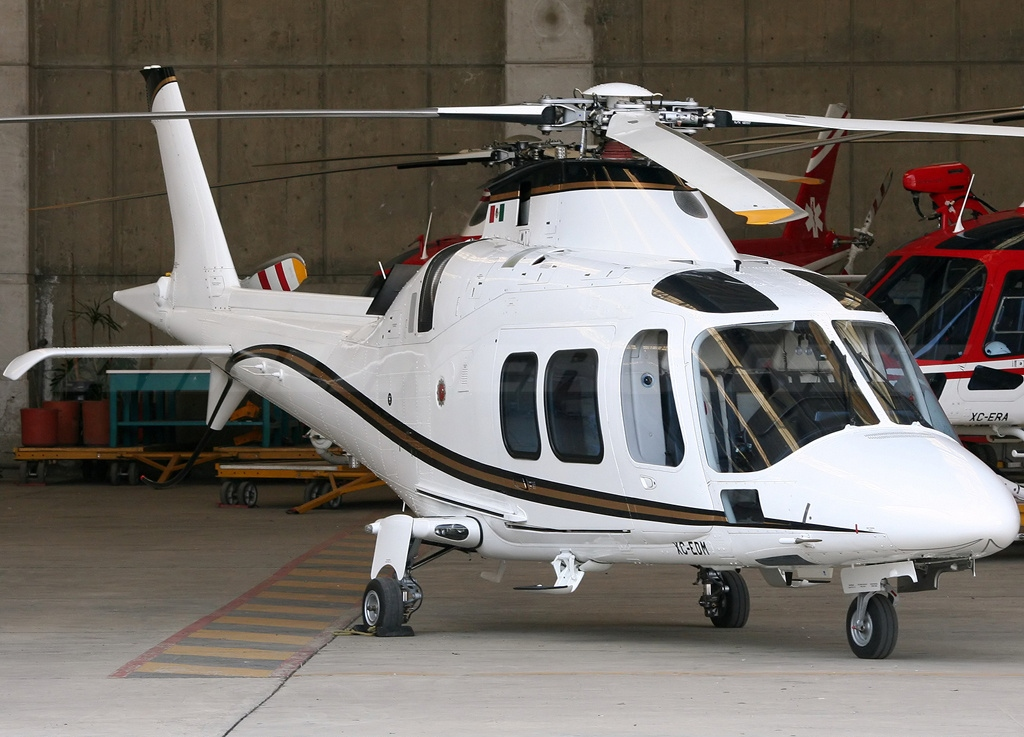
- An AgustaWestland AW109S Grand similar to the one involved in the accident

Accident
- Date: 24 December 2018
- Summary: Mechanical failure due to maintenance error.
- Site: Coronango, Puebla, Mexico; 19°6′48.456″N 98°18′12.442″W

Aircraft
- Aircraft type: AgustaWestland AW109S Grand
- Operator: Servicios Aéreos del Altiplano
- Registration: XA-BON
- Flight origin: Puebla
- Destination: Mexico City
- Occupants: 5
- Passengers: 3
- Crew: 2
- Fatalities: 5
- Survivors: 0

On December 24, 2018, a helicopter carrying Martha Érika Alonso Hidalgo, the newly elected governor of the Mexican state of Puebla, and her husband, senator and former governor Rafael Moreno Valle Rosas, crashed on a hill in Coronango near the city of Puebla. All five people on board the helicopter were killed in the crash: Alonso, Moreno, the two pilots, Captain Roberto Coppe Obregón and Captain Marco Antonio Tavera Romero, and an assistant to the senator. Alonso was 10 days into her term as governor at that time of the crash. The accident investigation found a preexisting problem with a stability system on the helicopter.

== Crash ==
The helicopter was an AgustaWestland AW109S Grand manufactured in 2011 and owned by Servicios Aéreos del Altiplano, S.A. de C.V. (SAASA), an air taxi company headquartered at Puebla International Airport. Its destination was the Helipuerto Radio Capital in Mexico City. It crashed on 24 December at 14:50 local time (20:50 GMT), just ten minutes after takeoff from a heliport in Puebla. The crash site is in the municipality of Santa María Coronango, approximately 3.5 miles (5.6 km) north of Puebla International Airport.

== Investigation ==
The investigation of the crash was conducted by Mexican authorities from the Dirección General de Aeronáutica Civil and the office of the federal attorney general. They were assisted by representatives from Agusta and Pratt and Whitney, which manufactured the helicopter's engines.

Mexico had sought the aid of the United States National Transportation Safety Board; while the NTSB initially stated it could not support the investigation due to the ongoing government shutdown, an exception was made to allow the NTSB to support the investigation alongside investigators from the Transportation Safety Board of Canada.

The final report concluded on March 27, 2020, that the helicopter “should not have flown” because of a preexisting problem with a stability system on the helicopter that both the operator and the maintenance crew knew about. One piece was found to have two loose screws inside. Investigators found no objects that had collided with the aircraft and no pieces of the aircraft that had fallen off it prior to the crash. The government suspended the helicopter company and the company responsible for maintenance; the case has been turned over to prosecutors.

On 25 December 2020, Mexican authorities announced they had detained four people in connection with the helicopter crash. The four worked at Rotor Flight Services - a company that had a role in the functioning of the helicopter.

== Responses ==
Andrés Manuel
(@lopezobrador_)
tweeted:

Spanish:

Estoy recibiendo información de un accidente en Puebla por desplome de un helicóptero. Por confirmar que iban la gobernadora Martha Erika Alonso y el ex gobernador Rafael Moreno Valle. He ordenado a todo el gobierno actuar de inmediato.

Translation:

I am receiving information about an accident in Puebla involving a helicopter crash. Pending confirmation that Governor Martha Erika Alonso and former Governor Rafael Moreno Valle were on board. I have ordered the entire government to act immediately.

Dec 24, 2018

Federal and state officials immediately responded to the crash. President Andrés Manuel López Obrador (AMLO) immediately announced a federal investigation into the accident. Due to the political conflict around the election of Alonso, legislators from the National Action Party commented on the need for a transparent investigation.

The death of Governor Alonso, per provisions in the Puebla state constitution, required the state legislature to name an interim governor and call new elections in three to five months. In a press conference the evening of the accident, Jesús Rodríguez Almeida, who had been the general secretary of government, was announced as the interim governor. In the Senate, Moreno Valle was to be replaced by Roberto Moya Clemente, his alternate and Puebla's former state secretary of finances and administration.

Servicios Aéreos del Altiplano deleted its website and did not respond to messages and phone calls in the aftermath of the incident.
