= Antonio Sánchez Díaz de Rivera =

Mexican politician (born 1953)

- Born: 12 June 1953 (age 72); Puebla, Mexico
- Occupation: Politician
- Political party: PAN

Antonio Sánchez Díaz de Rivera (born 12 June 1953) is a Mexican politician from the National Action Party (PAN). In the 2006 general election he was elected to the Chamber of Deputies to represent Puebla's 12th district during the 60th session of Congress (2006–2009).
