= Mario Marín (politician) =

Mexican politician

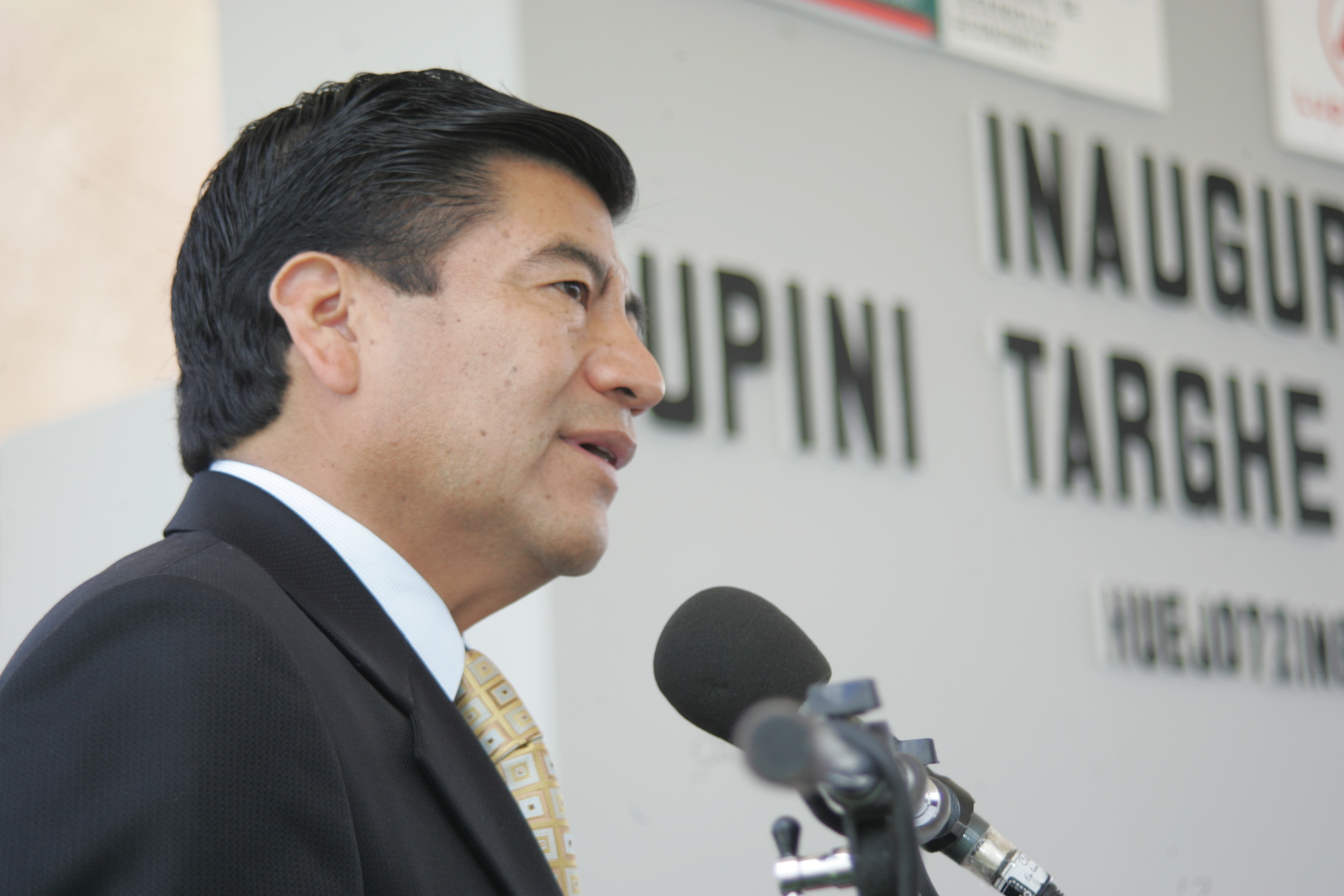

Governor of Puebla
- In office February 1, 2005 – January 31, 2011
- Preceded by: Melquiades Morales
- Succeeded by: Rafael Moreno Valle Rosas

Personal details
- Born: Mario Plutarco Marín Torres; June 28, 1954 (age 70); Nativitas Cuautempan, Puebla
- Political party: Institutional Revolutionary Party
- Spouse: Margarita García
- Profession: Lawyer, Politician

Mario Plutarco Marín Torres (born June 28, 1954) is a Mexican politician affiliated with the Institutional Revolutionary Party (PRI) who served as governor of the state of Puebla.

== Personal life and education ==
Marín was born to Crecencio Marín and Blandina Torres in Nativitas Cuautempan, near Ixcaquixtla, Puebla. He has ten siblings. He holds a bachelor's degree in law from the Universidad Autónoma de Puebla. He is married to Margarita García, with whom he has four children: Mario, Fernando, Luis, and Carlos.

== Political career ==
Marín is an active member of the PRI since 1972; he has occupied various positions in the public service in Puebla. He has been a professor of law at different universities in Puebla and has served as a judge and notary public in his native state. Marín has also served as municipal president of the city of Puebla.

In 2004 he ran for the governorship of Puebla as the PRI candidate; he won the elections held in November 2004 and took office on February 1, 2005. Prior to the controversy that exploded around him in February 2006, he was widely believed to be entertaining presidential ambitions with a view to the 2012 elections. His term ended on January 31, 2011.

=== Controversy ===
In February 2006, several telephone conversations between Kamel Nacif Borge and Mario Marín were revealed by the Mexico City daily La Jornada, causing a media frenzy. In these profanity-laden and misogynistic conversations, Nacif and Marín — whom the textile magnate referred to as mi góber precioso, loosely translated as "my gorgeous governor" or "my precious governor", and described as "my hero" — were exposed discussing the arrest of journalist Lydia Cacho. Nacif, who had been mentioned in Cacho's book The Demons of Eden which uncovered a sex exploitation ring, had Cacho arrested on defamation charges. Soon after, many sectors of the public took up the call for the resignation of Marín, whom they too began to call "el precioso Marín" and "mi góber precioso". Although the Puebla governor initially denied on national television that the voice in the taped conversations was his (adding that though he knew Nacif, he considered him a persona non grata), he later confessed that it was his voice and that he had held these conversations with Nacif, but claimed the recordings were used out of context. The following month, Lydia Cacho sued Mario Marín in a federal court for bribery, influence trafficking, conspiracy to rape, and abuse of authority.

In January 2007, the justices of the Supreme Court voted unanimously to look into the unusual circumstances surrounding Cacho's arrest by Puebla law enforcement officials in December 2005. Specifically, a three-judge committee was appointed to determine whether Marín abused his authority by manipulating channels to facilitate Cacho's arrest at the behest of clothing magnate Kamel Nacif. In November of the same year, the Supreme Court ruled that Marín had no case to answer in the affair.

On 3 February 2021, Marín was arrested in Acapulco and charged with torturing Cacho. He was transferred to Cancún.

Political offices
| Preceded by Melquiades Morales | Governor of Puebla; 2005–2011 | Succeeded by Rafael Moreno Valle Rosas |
