= 2019 Baja California state election =

State election in Mexico

During the 2019 Baja California state elections the following government positions were open for election:

- State governor: Head of state executive power; elected for a two-year term and is not eligible for re-election.
- City Council: Made up of a mayor and council members; Elected for a two-year term; eligible for re-election for an additional term. Elected officials from the previous term are eligible for re-election.
- 25 Congress Seats: 17 congress members are elected through the majority vote in their district; the other 8 congress members are elected based on the proportional representation of their district. Congress members elected by the majority vote can be re-elected for four consecutive terms.

== Background ==
During the 2016 election, the political climate shifted among the political parties. This was as a result of the growth of political parties who polled in second or third place. This prevented the popular party Acción Nacional y Revolucionario Institucional from dominating the elections against smaller parties like Encuentro Social, Movimiento Ciudadano or independent candidates for the first time.

During the second quarter of 2018, Baja California's department responsible for voting processes (Instituto Estatal Electoral de Baja California) allowed for the Encuentro Social name to be changed. Encuentro Social was recognized at the state level in Baja California but was not the same party as the party PES which was on the national registry. Because of this, Encuentro Social changed their name to Tranformemos.

The first individuals to show interest in running for state governor were Jaime Martínez Veloz, Arturo González Cruz and Jesús Ruiz Barraza. These candidates were all a part of the Morena party.

== Results ==
Jaime Bonilla Valdez of the National Regeneration Movement (Morena) was elected Governor of Baja California.
