= Puebla (municipality) =

- Municipality
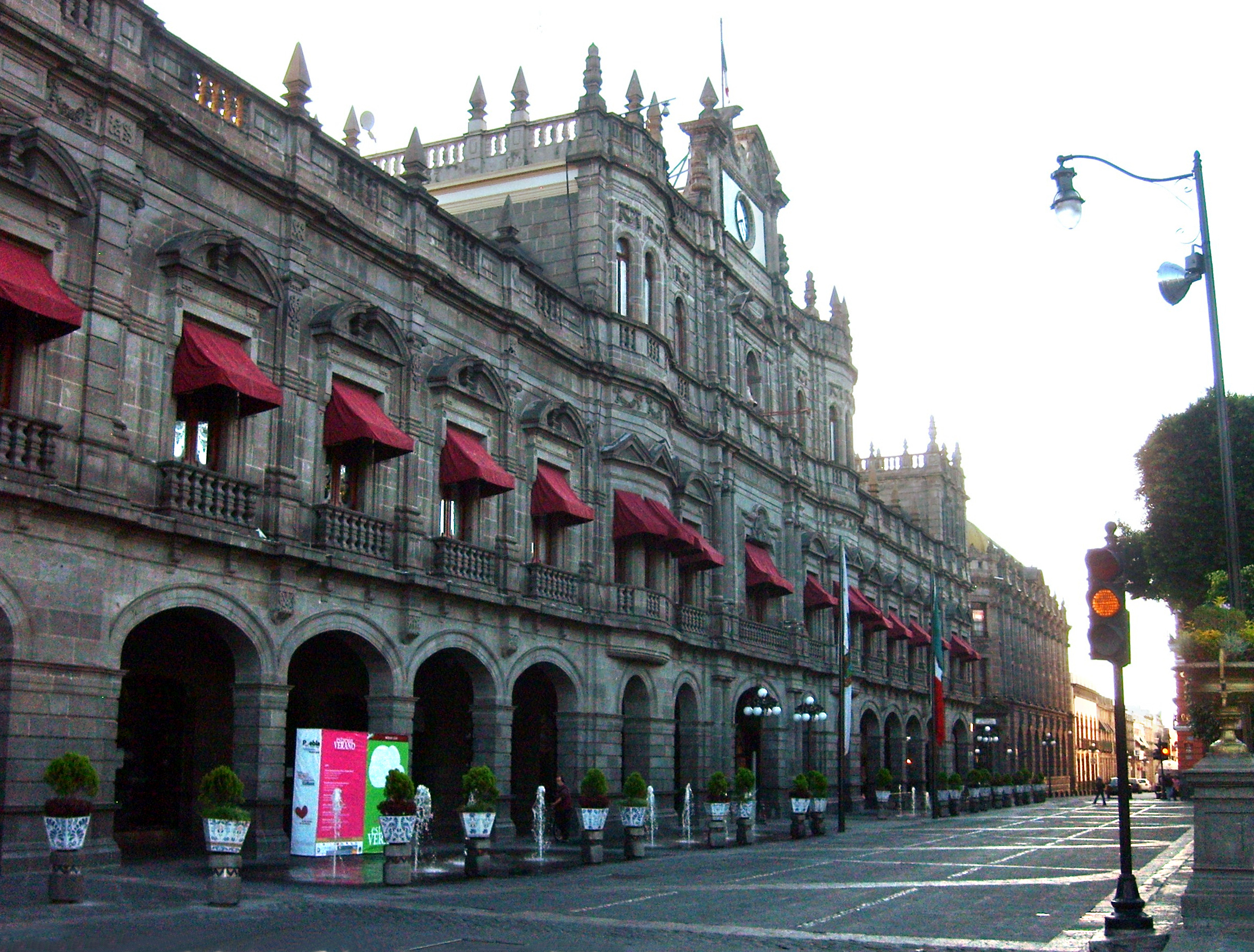
- Municipal Palace

- Flag Coat of arms

- Location of the municipality in Puebla
- Coordinates: 19.0413°N 98.2062°W
- Country: Mexico
- State: Puebla
- Seat: Puebla de Zaragoza

Area
  - Land: 534.32 km^{2} (206.30 sq mi)

Population (2020)
  - Total: 1,692,181
  - Density: 3,200/km^{2} (8,200/sq mi)
- Time zone: UTC-6 (Zona Centro)

Puebla is a municipality in the State of Puebla in eastern Central Mexico. The municipality covers a total area of 534.32 square kilometres (206.30 mi^{2}) and constitutes the central part of the Puebla Metropolitan Area. The City of Puebla is the municipal seat, as well as the capital of the state.

The municipality is located in the west-central region of the State of Puebla, bordering the municipalities of Santo Domingo Huehutlán, San Andrés Cholula, Teopantlán, Amozoc, Cuauthinchán, Tzicatlacoyan, Cuautlancingo, and Ocoyucan, and on the State of Tlaxcala.

== Municipal seat ==
The city of Puebla is the seat of the government for the 482 other communities in the municipality. However, 94% of the municipality's population of 1,485,941 is in the city proper. The historic center of the city of Puebla is a World Heritage Site.

== Environment ==
Most of the municipality has been deforested, including the lower portions of the Malinche volcano and all the Sierra de Amozoc, due to logging and seasonal farming.

The Sierra del Tentzon and higher elevations of Malinche volcano still conserve the Trans-Mexican Volcanic Belt pine-oak forests ecoregion — with forests of pine, holm oak and other tree species. In the pine forests, Montezuma Pine (Pinus montezumae) is generally predominant, with Hartweg's Pine (Pinus hartwegii) and Pinus teocote in dry areas with shallow soils. Pine-fir forests are composed almost entirely of Hartweg's Pine (Pinus hartwegii) and Sacred Fir (Abies religiosa).

Animal life consists mostly of small mammals such as rabbits and skunks, as well as birds such as owls, buzzards and wild waterfowl.

== Economy ==
Some agriculture still takes place in the municipality but environmental degradation and the growth of the city is making this a smaller sector of the economy. Crops raised include corn, beans, wheat, oats, avocados, pears, apples, peaches, choke cherries, Mexican hawthorns, nuts and white sapotes. Most agriculture takes place on small plots on the edges of the municipality. Similarly livestock such as cattle, pigs, sheep and horses are raised.

Industry accounts for about eighty percent of the economy and is mostly based on the outskirts of the city as well as in some surrounding municipalities. Main products include basic metals, chemicals, electrical items and textiles. The main employers are Hylsa and the Volkswagen automotive plant. A growing sector is food processing. Many industries are consolidated into parks such as the 5 de Mayo Industrial Park, the Resurrección Industrial Zone and the Puebla 2000 Industrial Park.

== See also ==
- List of municipal presidents of Puebla
