= Myriam Arabian =

Mexican politician

- Born: Myriam de Lourdes Arabian Couttolenc; 6 June 1960 (age 65); Puebla, Mexico
- Occupation: Politician
- Political party: PAN

Myriam de Lourdes Arabian Couttolenc (born 6 June 1960) is a Mexican politician affiliated with the National Action Party (PAN). In the 2003 mid-terms she was elected to the Chamber of Deputies to represent Puebla's 12th district during the 59th session of Congress.
