= José Enrique Doger Guerrero =

Mexican politician (born 1957)

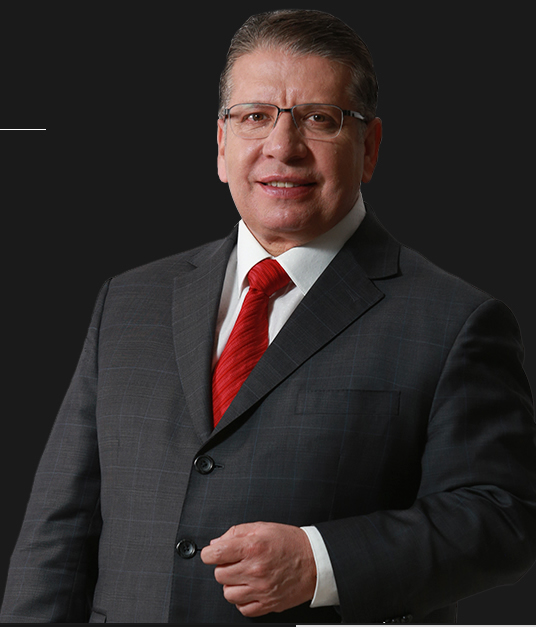
- Doger Guerrero in 2018
- Born: 19 August 1957 (age 68); Acajete, Puebla, Mexico
- Education: BUAP
- Occupation: Politician
- Political party: PRI

José Enrique Doger Guerrero (born 19 August 1957) is a Mexican politician affiliated with the Institutional Revolutionary Party (PRI). From 2005 to 2008, he served as mayor of the city of Puebla after serving as rector of his alma mater, the Meritorious Autonomous University of Puebla (BUAP). In the 2012 general election he was elected to the Chamber of Deputies to represent Puebla's 6th district during the 62nd session of Congress.
