= Coronango =

Coordinates: 19.1167°N 98.2833°W

- Municipality and town
- Coat of arms

- Location of the municipality in Puebla
- Country: Mexico
- State: Puebla
- Time zone: UTC-6 (Zona Centro)

Coronango is a town and municipality in the Mexican state of Puebla.

== Helicopter crash ==
On December 24, 2018, an AgustaWestland AW109 operated by Servicios Aéreos Del Altiplano S.A crashed in the municipality while carrying Martha Érika Alonso, her husband and three more people, approximately 3.5 miles (5.6 km) north of Puebla International Airport.
