= Electoral regions of Mexico =

Areas used in the election of proportional representation federal deputies

The electoral regions (Spanish: circunscripciones electorales) of Mexico are geographic areas composed of various states used for the election of the 200 proportional representation legislators to the Chamber of Deputies.

The country is split into five separate regions. Each of the five regions elects 40 deputies, who are selected according to party lists in the regions. To distinguish them from those elected in the 300 single-member constituencies, they are often referred to as "plurinominal deputies".

In contrast, the 32 senators-at-large elected to the Senate by the principle of proportional representation are drawn from party lists covering the entire country; the electoral regions therefore play no role in Senate elections.

== Distribution ==
The electoral regions are intended to ensure a roughly equal distribution of population among the regions and may be modified by the National Electoral Institute (INE). The distribution in use since 30 September 2005 was slightly reorganized for the 2024 general election.

An arithmetically perfect distribution of the five regions would mean that each covers 60 of the single-member constituencies. Under the 2024 scheme, that is true only of the third region: regions 1 and 4 contain 61 federal electoral districts, and regions 5 and 2 contain 59.

2024 map	Region	Seat	States (2024)	2020 population (of the 2024 regions)	States (2005–2023)	2006 population (of the 2005 regions)	2024 plan changes
Mexico divided into the five electoral regions
Mexico divided into the five electoral regions	First	Guadalajara, Jalisco	Baja California, Baja California Sur, Chihuahua, Durango, Jalisco, Nayarit, Sinaloa, Sonora	25,697,376	Baja California, Baja California Sur, Chihuahua, Durango, Jalisco, Nayarit, Sinaloa, Sonora	21,136,816	
Mexico divided into the five electoral regions	Second	Monterrey, Nuevo León	Aguascalientes, Coahuila, Guanajuato, Nuevo León, San Luis Potosí, Tamaulipas, Zacatecas	24,495,882	Aguascalientes, Coahuila, Guanajuato, Nuevo León, Querétaro, San Luis Potosí, Tamaulipas, Zacatecas	21,417,106	Querétaro was moved to the fifth region
Mexico divided into the five electoral regions	Third	Xalapa, Veracruz	Campeche, Chiapas, Oaxaca, Quintana Roo, Tabasco, Veracruz, Yucatán	25,248,399	Campeche, Chiapas, Oaxaca, Quintana Roo, Tabasco, Veracruz, Yucatán	20,945,125	
Mexico divided into the five electoral regions	Fourth	Mexico City	Mexico City, Guerrero, Hidalgo, Morelos, Puebla, Tlaxcala	25,731,245	Mexico City, Guerrero, Morelos, Puebla, Tlaxcala	20,173,001	Hidalgo was added from the fifth region
Mexico divided into the five electoral regions	Fifth	Toluca, State of Mexico	Colima, State of Mexico, Michoacán, Querétaro	24,841,122	Colima, Hidalgo, State of Mexico, Michoacán	21,172,323	Hidalgo was moved to the fourth region and Querétaro was added from the second region

== Geographical evolution ==
The number of electoral regions and their configurations have evolved over time.

1979–1981

In their initial form, there were three regions, from which 100 deputies were elected in the 1979 mid-term election. Regions 1 and 2 elected 30 seats, while No. 3 was assigned 40.

1. Aguascalientes, Baja California, Baja California Sur, Colima, Guanajuato, Guerrero, Jalisco, Michoacán, Nayarit, Sinaloa, Sonora
2. Chihuahua, Coahuila, Durango, Hidalgo, Nuevo León, Querétaro, San Luis Potosí, Tamaulipas, Veracruz, Zacatecas
3. Campeche, Chiapas, Federal District, State of Mexico, Morelos, Oaxaca, Puebla, Quintana Roo, Tabasco, Tlaxcala, Yucatán

1982–1984

The number of regions was increased to four for the 1982 general election. Each was assigned 25 seats.

1. Federal District, Hidalgo, Morelos, Puebla, San Luis Potosí, Tlaxcala
2. Chihuahua, Coahuila, Durango, Guanajuato, State of Mexico, Querétaro, Zacatecas
3. Campeche, Chiapas, Nuevo León, Oaxaca, Quintana Roo, Tabasco, Tamaulipas, Veracruz, Yucatán
4. Aguascalientes, Baja California, Baja California Sur, Colima, Guerrero, Jalisco, Michoacán, Nayarit, Sinaloa, Sonora

1985–1996

The fifth region was introducted for the 1985 election. The regions were initially assigned 20 seats each, but the number was increased to 40 (for a total of 200 plurinominal deputies) for the 1988 election. Under this plan, the first district’s territory was non-contiguous.

1. Federal District, Puebla, Tlaxcala
2. Aguascalientes, Chihuahua, Coahuila, Durango, Hidalgo, Guanajuato, Querétaro, San Luis Potosí, Zacatecas
3. Campeche, Chiapas, Nuevo León, Quintana Roo, Tabasco, Tamaulipas, Veracruz, Yucatán
4. Baja California, Baja California Sur, Colima, Jalisco, Michoacán, Nayarit, Sinaloa, Sonora
5. Guerrero, Oaxaca, State of Mexico, Morelos

1997–2004

Five regions, each returning 40 deputies:

1. Baja California, Baja California Sur, Colima, Guanajuato, Jalisco, Nayarit, Sinaloa, Sonora
2. Aguascalientes, Chihuahua, Coahuila, Durango, Nuevo León, Querétaro, San Luis Potosí, Tamaulipas, Zacatecas
3. Campeche, Chiapas, Oaxaca, Quintana Roo, Tabasco, Veracruz, Yucatán
4. Federal District, Hidalgo, Morelos, Puebla, Tlaxcala
5. Guerrero, State of Mexico, Michoacán

2005–2023

Five regions with 40 seats each:

1. Baja California, Baja California Sur, Chihuahua, Durango, Jalisco, Nayarit, Sinaloa, Sonora
2. Aguascalientes, Coahuila, Guanajuato, Nuevo León, Querétaro, San Luis Potosí, Tamaulipas, Zacatecas
3. Campeche, Chiapas, Oaxaca, Quintana Roo, Tabasco, Veracruz, Yucatán
4. Federal District (later, Mexico City), Guerrero, Morelos, Puebla, Tlaxcala
5. Colima, Hidalgo, State of Mexico, Michoacán

== Historical evolution ==
The first steps away from a system based solely on single-member districts were taken with the 1963 constitutional amendments that introduced "party deputies" (diputados de partido). Under this mechanism, parties winning more than 2.5% of the popular vote were awarded five party deputy seats, with an additional seat for each 0.5% above that figure, up to a maximum of 20. Any single-member seats the party in question might have won counted towards the 20-seat ceiling, and parties winning more than 20 single-member seats (in practical terms, only the then-hegemonic Institutional Revolutionary Party) were not eligible for the party deputy mechanism. Party deputies were first elected in the 1964 general election, in which three opposition parties – which collectively failed to win any first-past-the-post districts – were allocated 34 seats. The threshold was lowered to 1.5% (still with five seats awarded) in 1972.

The electoral region mechanism was introduced as part of the 1977 political reforms. First used for the 1979 legislative election, there were at first only three regions, which elected 100 plurinominal deputies. The three regions were unequal in size, with Nos. 1 and 2 electing 30 seats and No. 3 (which included the Federal District) electing 40.

For the 1982 general election, the number of regions was increased to four and they were more balanced, with populations of between 17.1 million and 18.8 million, each electing 25 seats. The fifth region was introduced for the 1985 mid-terms; under that scheme, the regions' populations ranged from 12.8 million to 17.2 million, but they were all assigned 20 seats. Notably, this scheme failed to abide by the criterion of contiguity, with the first region consisting of the Federal District and the non-adjacent states of Puebla and Tlaxcala.

In the 1979 to 1985 elections, plurinominal deputies were awarded to those parties that received more than 1.5% of the popular vote but fewer than 60 single-member districts.

Following further reforms in 1986–87, the number of plurinominal seats in the Chamber was increased to its current level of 200 for the 1988 election. The eligibility threshold was kept at 1.5%, but the disqualification of parties winning more than 60 single-member seats was eliminated: instead, all parties with 50% or fewer of the single-member seats were eligible to receive plurinominal seats. Parties were, however, subject to an upper limit of 350 seats.

The plurinominal allocation system was redesigned in 1989–90. It provided for three possible scenarios:

1. If no party achieved 35% of the popular vote, all parties were eligible to receive plurinominal seats, distributed in such a way that their seat numbers remained as close as possible to their vote percentages.
2. A party receiving between 35% and 60% of the vote would be assigned as many plurinominal seats as necessary for it to have 51% of the total (255 seats), plus an additional two seats for each percentage point of the vote over 35% up to a maximum of 295 seats.
3. A party receiving from 60% to 70% of the vote would receive as many plurinominal seats as necessary to level its seat percentage with its vote percentage.

Silvia Gómez Tagle of El Colegio de México described this system as both "inequitable" and "irrational": for example, it was not inconceivable that two parties could each receive over 35% of the popular vote.

The system was amended again in 1993. Under this scheme, the plurinominal seats were distributed among all the parties in line with their percentages of the popular vote, without taking any account of their first-past-the-post victories.

A new redistribution of the states was undertaken in 1997 and those regions remained in effect until 2005.

== See also ==
- National Electoral Institute
- Chamber of Deputies (Mexico)
- Elections in Mexico
