= The Demons of Eden =

2005 nonfiction book by Lydia Cacho

The Demons of Eden: The Power that Protects Child Pornography
- Author: Lydia Cacho
- Language: Spanish
- Publication date: 2005

The Demons of Eden: The Power that Protects Child Pornography (Spanish: Los demonios del Edén. El poder que protege a la pornografía infantil) is a book by the Mexican journalist Lydia Cacho that analyzed child pornography and international child prostitution. The book records Cacho's investigation of the networks of powerful people who abused or allowed for the abuse of children. Cacho lists the names of those involved in the exploitation and offers an examination of the inner workings of the child sex trade and politics in Mexico.

Cacho includes the name of a millionaire hotel franchise owner with interests in Cancún and personal connections to the state of Puebla, Jean Succar Kuri, who was then 60 years old. In response to the accusations and evidence presented against him in the book, he was detained in Chandler, Arizona, by agents of the United States Marshals Service in compliance with an arrest warrant generated by the Attorney General of Mexico.
