= Rafael Moreno Valle Rosas =

Mexican politician (1968–2018)

Rafael Moreno Valle
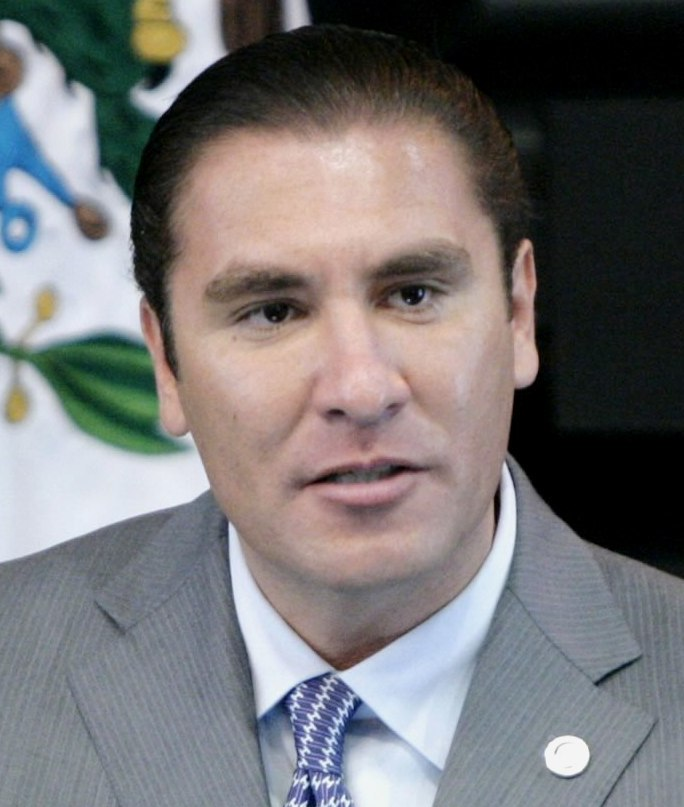

Governor of Puebla
- In office 1 February 2011 – 31 January 2017
- Preceded by: Mario Plutarco Marín Torres
- Succeeded by: José Antonio Gali Fayad

Senator for Puebla
- In office 1 September 2006 – 4 July 2010
- Preceded by: Germán Sierra Sánchez
- Succeeded by: María Leticia Jasso

Deputy of the Congress of the Union for Puebla's 8th district
- In office 1 September 2003 – 11 August 2004
- Preceded by: Jaime Alcántara Silva
- Succeeded by: José López Medina

Personal details
- Born: 30 June 1968 Puebla, Puebla, Mexico
- Died: 24 December 2018 (aged 50) Coronango, Puebla, Mexico
- Party: PRI, PAN
- Spouse: Martha Erika Alonso (m. 2004)
- Education: Lycoming College; Boston University School of Law
- Profession: Lawyer and economist

Rafael Moreno Valle Rosas (30 June 1968 – 24 December 2018) was a Mexican politician affiliated at different times with both the Institutional Revolutionary Party (PRI) and the National Action Party (PAN). He was the governor of Puebla from February 2011 through January 2017.

Moreno Valle also served as a deputy during the 59th Congress, representing Puebla's 8th district for the PRI, and as a senator in the 60th, 61st and 64th sessions of Congress for the PAN.

Moreno Valle was the grandson of Rafael Moreno Valle, a doctor, military officer and politician who also served as the governor of Puebla from 1969 to 1972. He was also the spouse of Martha Erika Alonso Hidalgo, the first woman governor of Puebla.

== Death ==
On 24 December 2018, a helicopter carrying Moreno Valle, his wife Martha Erika Alonso Hidalgo, and other PAN politicians from the state crashed in a field near the town of Santa María Coronango, half an hour from the city of Puebla, killing both. In a tweet, President Andrés Manuel López Obrador indicated that Alonso and Moreno Valle were on the downed aircraft. At the time, Moreno Valle was a proportional representation senator. Alonso had become the first female governor of Puebla only ten days before she was killed.

A 27 March 2020 report by Secretariat of Communications and Transportation (SCT) concluded that the helicopter “should not have flown” because of a preexisting problem with a stability system on the helicopter that both the operator and the maintenance crew knew about.

Rafael Moreno Valle's death caused widespread controversy, with allegations of an attempt

Political offices
Preceded by Mario Plutarco Marín Torres	Governor of Puebla; 2011–2017	Succeeded by José Antonio Gali Fayad
