= Martha Érika Alonso =

Mexican politician (1973–2018)

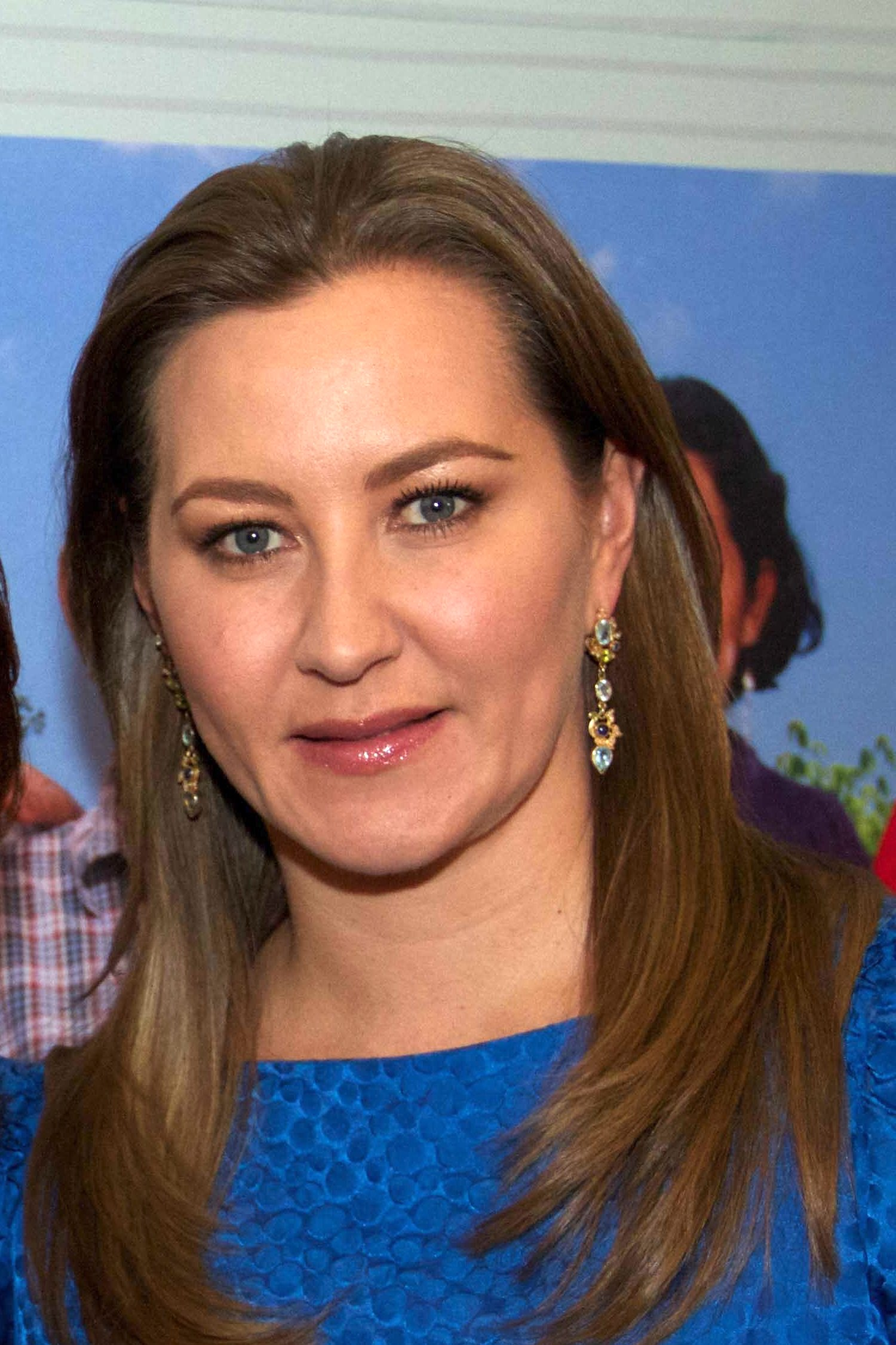
- Alonso in 2013

Governor of Puebla
- In office 14 December 2018 – 24 December 2018
- Preceded by: José Antonio Gali Fayad
- Succeeded by: Jesús Rodríguez Almeida

First Lady of Puebla
- In role 1 February 2011 – 30 February 2017
- Governor: Rafael Moreno Valle Rosas
- Preceded by: Margarita García
- Succeeded by: Alma Dinorah López Gargallo

Personal details
- Born: Martha Érika Alonso; 17 December 1973 Puebla
- Died: 24 December 2018 (aged 45) Santa María Coronango, Puebla
- Party: National Action Party
- Spouse: Rafael Moreno Valle Rosas (m. 2004)

Martha Érika Alonso Hidalgo (Spanish pronunciation: [ˈmaɾta ˈeɾika aˈlonsojˈðalɣo]; 17 December 1973 – 24 December 2018; also called Martha Érika Alonso de Moreno Valle) was a Mexican politician of the National Action Party (PAN) who served as the first female governor of Puebla from 14 December 2018 until her death ten days later in a helicopter crash. She was the spouse of Rafael Moreno Valle Rosas, who was governor of Puebla from 2011 to 2017 and was also killed in the crash.

== Life ==
Born on 17 December 1973, Martha Érika Alonso Hidalgo attended the Universidad Iberoamericana Puebla, where she studied graphic design, and the Universidad de las Américas Puebla, from which she graduated with a master's degree in public communication. She married Moreno Valle in 2004.

In 2009, she became an active member of the PAN, and from 2011 to 2016, coinciding with most of her husband's tenure as governor, she presided over the foundation for the Puebla State DIF System. The DIF received more money during Alonso's leadership than it had in the preceding two state governments. In 2015, she became the state party's secretary general, holding its second-ranking position. Her education and professional experience lent her additional respect, leading to her being recognized as one of the most powerful first ladies in Puebla history.

=== Gubernatorial candidacy ===
In 2018, Alonso ran for Governor of Puebla—her first campaign for elected office—backed by the Por Puebla al Frente coalition, which included the PAN, Party of the Democratic Revolution, Movimiento Ciudadano, and two state parties (Compromiso por Puebla and Pacto Social de Integración). The PAN and the state parties had supported Moreno Valle's 2011 gubernatorial bid. She allegedly was picked for the nomination because PAN internal polling showed her as being a stronger candidate than the mayor of Puebla, Eduardo Rivera Pérez.

During the campaign, Alonso sought to distance herself from her husband, who did not appear at promotional events; she also did not use her husband's last name (Martha Érika Alonso de Moreno Valle), as she had while running the Puebla DIF. However, several staffers from Moreno Valle's campaign and government joined Alonso's team, including the former state press secretary and former state legislators, and state political experts pointed out her use of similar strategies to Moreno Valle's campaign.

Alonso won the election, defeating Miguel Barbosa Huerta on the Juntos Haremos Historia coalition ticket and two other candidates, on 1 July 2018, as the first female governor of Puebla and the seventh nationwide.

=== Death ===
On 24 December 2018, a helicopter carrying Alonso, Rafael Moreno Valle and other PAN politicians from the state crashed in a field near the town of Santa María Coronango, half an hour from the city of Puebla, killing all. In a tweet, President Andrés Manuel López Obrador indicated that Alonso and Moreno Valle were on the downed aircraft; she had been governor for ten days.

A 27 March 2020 report by Secretariat of Communications and Transportation (SCT) concluded that the helicopter “should not have flown” because of a preexisting problem with a stability system on the helicopter that both the operator and the maintenance crew knew about.
