= Governor of Puebla =

Chief executive of the Mexican state of Puebla

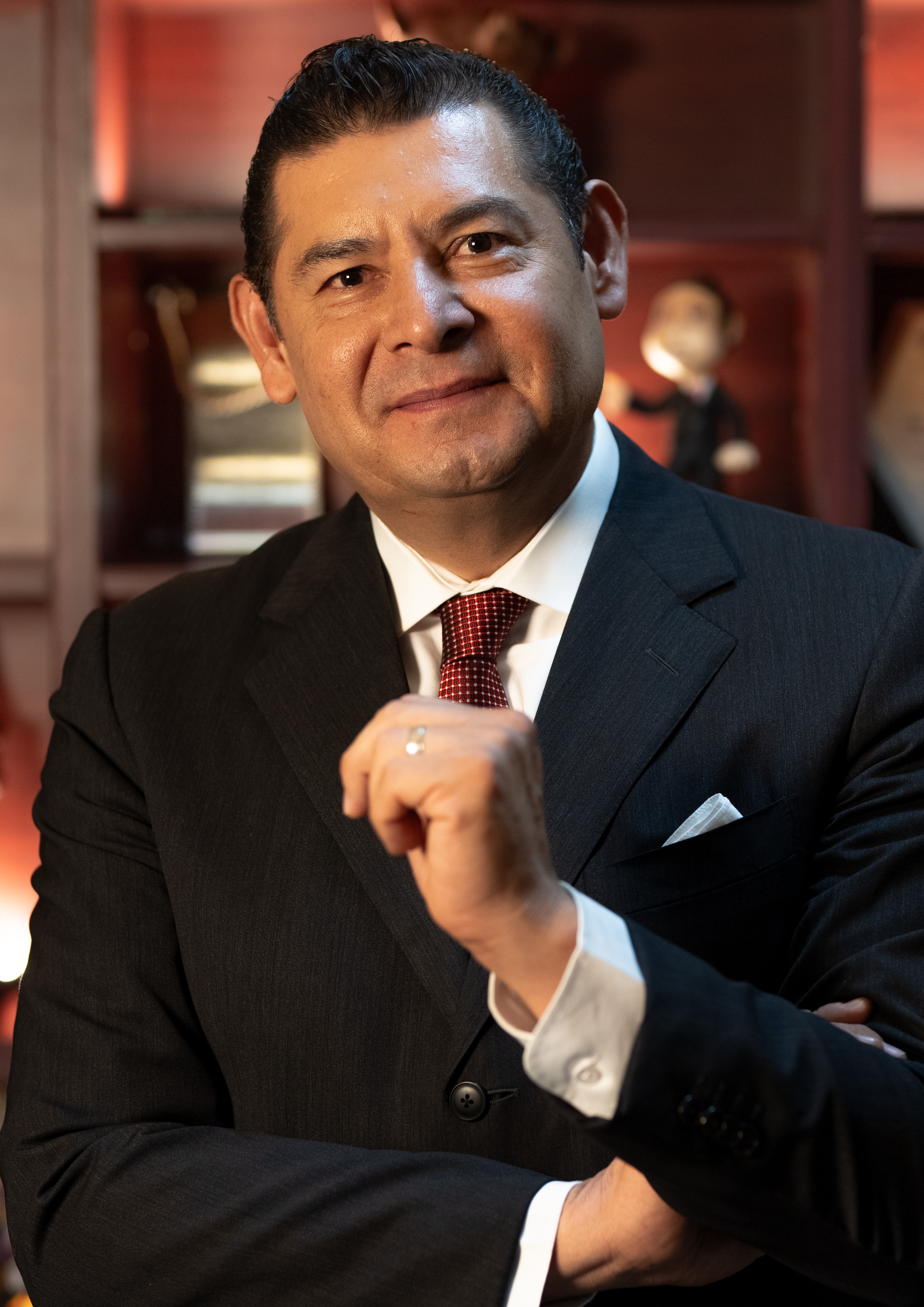
- Incumbent; Alejandro Armenta Mier since 14 December 2024
- Term length: Six years, non-renewable.

The governor of Puebla is the chief executive of the Mexican state of Puebla.

Governors of Puebla
#	Image	Name	Took office	Left office	Party
45		Alejandro Armenta Mier	2024		MORENA; Substitute
44		Sergio Salomón Céspedes	2022	2024	MORENA; Substitute
43		Miguel Barbosa Huerta	2019	2022 (died in office)	MORENA
42		Guillermo Pacheco Pulido	2019	2019	Interim
41		Jesús Rodríguez Almeida	2018	2019	Acting
40		Martha Érika Alonso Hidalgo	2018	2018 (died in office)	PAN
39		José Antonio Gali Fayad	2017	2018	PAN
38		Rafael Moreno Valle Rosas	2011	2017	PAN
37		Mario Marín Torres	2005	2011	PRI
36		Melquiades Morales Flores	1999	2005	PRI
35		Manuel Bartlett Díaz	1993	1999	PRI
34		Mariano Piña Olaya	1987	1993	PRI
33		Guillermo Jiménez Morales	1981	1987	PRI
32		Toxqui Fernández de Lara	1975	1981	PRI
31		Guillermo Morales Blumenkron	1973	1975	PRI
30		Gonzalo Bautista O'Farril	1973	1973	PRI
29		Mario Mellado García	1973	1973	PRI
28		Rafael Moreno Valle	1969	1973	PRI
29		Aarón Merino Fernández	1966	1969	PRI
28		Antonio Nava Castillo	1965	1966	PRI
27		Arturo Fernández Aguirre	1960	1965	PRI
26		Fausto M. Ortega	1957	1960	PRI
25		Rafael Ávila Camacho	1951	1957	PRI
24		Carlos I. Betancourt	1945	1951	PRM
22		Gonzalo Bautista Castillo	1941	1945	PRM
21		Maximino Ávila Camacho	1937	1941	PNR
20		Gustavo Ariza	1933	1937	PNR
19		José Mijares Palencia	1933	1933	PNR
18		Juan Crisóstomo Bonilla	1933	1937	PNR
17		Leónides Andrew Almazán	1929	1932	PNR
16		Donato Bravo Izquierdo	1927	1929	
15		Manuel P. Montes	1926	1926	
14		Claudio N. Tirado	1925	1927	
13		Wenseslao Macip	1925	1925	
12		Arturo Osorio	1925	1925	
11		Enrique Moreno	1924	1924	
10		Alberto Guerrero	1924	1924	
9		Francisco Espinosa Fleury	1923	1923	
8		Vicente Lombardo Toledano	1923	1923	
7		Froylán C. Manjares	1922	1922	
6		José María Sánchez Rojas	1921	1921	
5		Roberto Labastida	1921	1921	
4		Claudio N. Tirado	1921	1921	
3		Luis Sánchez Pontón	1920	1921	
2		Rafael Rojas	1920	1920	
1		Alfonso Cabrera Lobato	1917	1920	
