= Congress of Puebla =

Legislature of Puebla, Mexico

Honorable Congress of the State of Puebla Honorable Congreso del Estado de Puebla
- LXII Legislature

Type
- Type: Unicameral

History
- Founded: January 1, 1826

Structure
- Seats: 41
- Political groups: Government (34) Morena (17) PVEM (7) PT (6) NAP (2) FxMP (2) Opposition (7) PAN (5) PRI (1) MC (1)

Elections
- Voting system: First-past-the-post for 26 seats and mixed-member proportional representation for 15 seats
- Last election: 2 June 2024

Meeting place
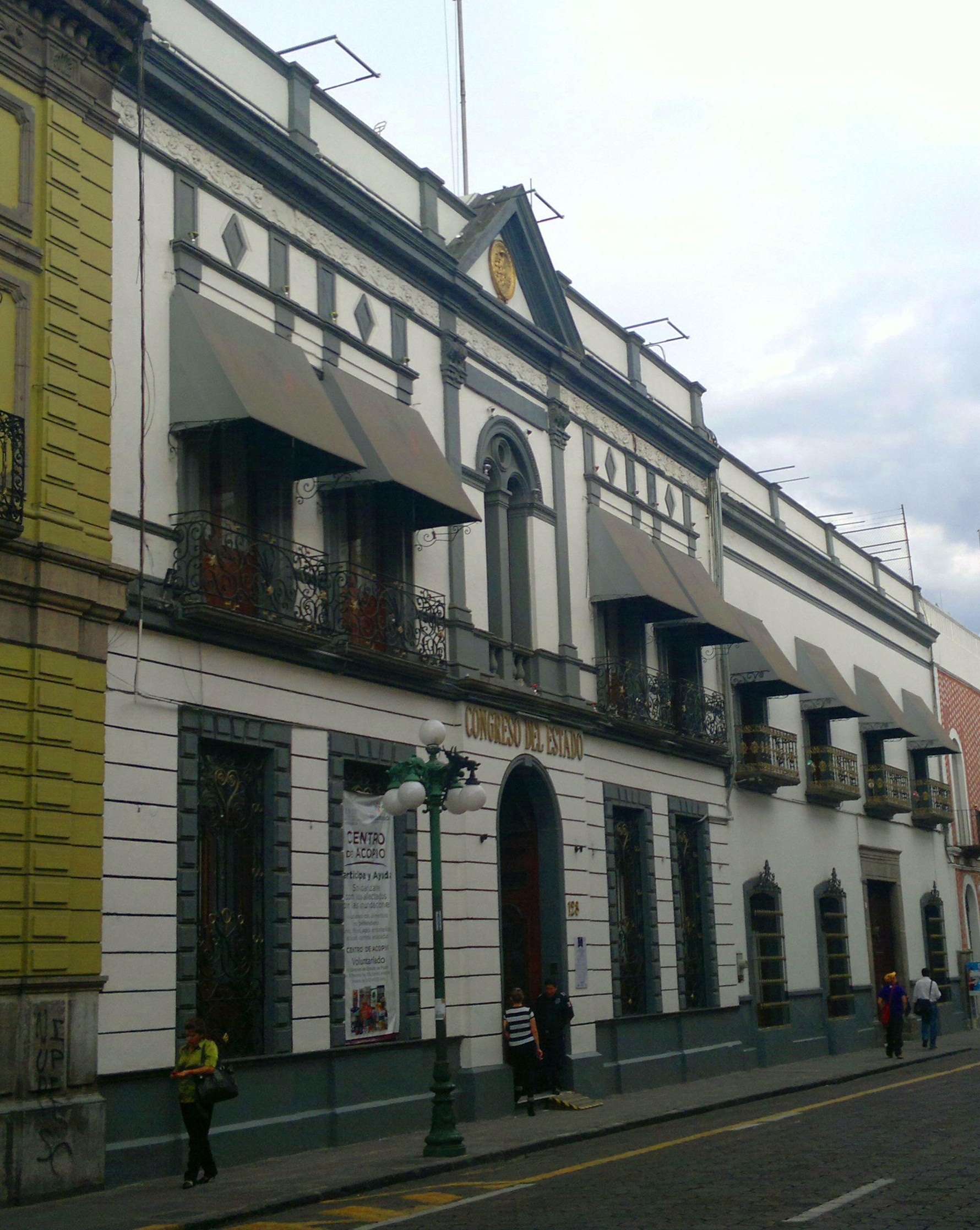
- Building of the Congress of the State of Puebla, Puebla, Puebla, Mexico

Website
- www.congresopuebla.gob.mx

The Honorable Congress of the State of Puebla (Spanish: Honorable Congreso del Estado de Puebla) is the legislative branch of the government of the State of Puebla. It was constituted for the first time after the independence of Mexico on January 1, 1826. The Congress is the governmental deliberative body of Puebla, which is equal to, and independent of, the executive. The Congress is unicameral.

== See also ==
- List of Mexican state congresses
