= December 24 =

December 24 this year in various calendars
- Thursday, 24 December 2026
Akan	Monoyaw
Armenian	7 Arach 1476
Aztec	Huei Tozoztli 3, 11 Cōzcacuāuhtli
Babylonian	14 Kislimu, 2337 SE
Balinese pawukon	Menga, Kajeng, Laba, Keliwon, Maulu, Wraspati of Warigadian, Brahma, Erangan, Manusa
Bengali	9 Poush, BS 1433
Chinese	Yang Water Monkey・Legs Mansion; Fire Horse Year, Month 11, Day 16 (Dongzhi, 12 days until Xiaohan)
Common Era	24 December 2026 CE
Coptic	15 Koiak, AM 1743
Egyptian	12 Pachon, 2775 NE
Ethiopian	15 Tākḫśāś, 2019 Amätä Məhrät
French Republican	Décade I, Tridi de Nivôse de l'Année 235 de la République
Gregorian	24 December, AD 2026
Hebrew	14 Tevet, AM 5787
Hindu	Ārdrā・Śukla; Solar: 9 Pauṣa, 1948 SE; Lunisolar: Pūrṇimā, Śukla pakṣa of Mārgaśīrṣa, 2083 VE; Rāudra・5127 KY・1,872,933
Icelandic	Fimmtudagur, 2 Mörsugur 2026
Islamic	14 Rajab, AH 1448 (using tabular method)
ISO week date	2026-W52-4
Japanese	16 Shimotsuki, Reiwa 8 (Tōji, 12 days until Shōkan)
Julian	11 December, AD 2026 (AM 7535)
Julian day	2461399
Korean	16 Jwidal, 4359 DE
Maya	13.0.14.3.16; 9 Kankin, 11 Cib
Roman	ante diem III Idus Decembres, MMDCCLXXIX AUC
Solar Hijri	3 Dey, SH 1405
Tibetan	16 mgo, me pho rta 2153 or 1772 or 1000

<<	December					>>
Su	Mo	Tu	We	Th	Fr	Sa
		1	2	3	4	5
6	7	8	9	10	11	12
13	14	15	16	17	18	19
20	21	22	23	24	25	26
27	28	29	30	31
2026

December 24 in recent years
2025 (Wednesday)
2024 (Tuesday)
2023 (Sunday)
2022 (Saturday)
2021 (Friday)
2020 (Thursday)
2019 (Tuesday)
2018 (Monday)
2017 (Sunday)
2016 (Saturday)

December 24 is the 358th day of the year (359th in leap years) in the Gregorian calendar; seven days remain until the end of the year.

== Events ==
=== Pre-1600 ===
- 502 – Chinese emperor Xiao Yan names Xiao Tong his heir designate.
- 640 – Pope John IV is elected, several months after his predecessor's death.
- 759 – Tang dynasty poet Du Fu departs for Chengdu, where he is hosted by fellow poet Pei Di.
- 971 – Battle of Ayn Shams: The Fatimids under Jawhar defeat the Qarmatians at the gates of Cairo, putting an end to the First Qarmatian invasion of Egypt.
- 1144 – The capital of the crusader County of Edessa falls to Imad ad-Din Zengi, the atabeg of Mosul and Aleppo.
- 1294 – Pope Boniface VIII is elected, replacing St. Celestine V, who had resigned.
- 1500 – A joint Venetian–Spanish fleet captures the Castle of St. George on the island of Cephalonia.

=== 1601–1900 ===
- 1737 – The Marathas defeat the combined forces of the Mughal Empire, Rajputs of Jaipur, Nizam of Hyderabad, Nawab of Awadh and Nawab of Bengal in the Battle of Bhopal.
- 1777 – Kiritimati, also called Christmas Island, is discovered by James Cook.
- 1800 – The Plot of the rue Saint-Nicaise fails to kill Napoleon Bonaparte.
- 1814 – Representatives of the United Kingdom and the United States sign the Treaty of Ghent, ending the War of 1812.
- 1818 – The first performance of "Silent Night" takes place in the Nikolauskirche in Oberndorf, Austria.
- 1846 – British acquired Labuan from the Sultanate of Brunei for Great Britain.
- 1865 – Former Confederate officers Frank McCord, Richard Reed, John Lester, John Kennedy, J. Calvin Jones, and James Crowe form the Ku Klux Klan.
- 1868 – The Greek Presidential Guard is established as the royal escort by King George I.

=== 1901–present ===
- 1906 – Reginald Fessenden transmits the first radio broadcast; consisting of a poetry reading, a violin solo, and a speech.
- 1913 – The Italian Hall disaster in Calumet, Michigan results in the deaths of 73 striking workers families at a Christmas party participants (including 59 children) when someone falsely yells "fire".
- 1914 – World War I: The "Christmas truce" begins.
- 1918 – Region of Međimurje is captured by the Kingdom of Serbs, Croats and Slovenes from Hungary.
- 1920 – Gabriele D'Annunzio surrendered the Italian Regency of Carnaro in the city of Fiume to Italian Armed Forces.
- 1924 – Albania becomes a republic.
- 1929 – Assassination attempt on Argentine President Hipólito Yrigoyen.
- 1929 – A four alarm fire breaks out in the West Wing of the White House in Washington, D.C.
- 1939 – World War II: Pope Pius XII makes a Christmas Eve appeal for peace.
- 1941 – World War II: Kuching is conquered by Japanese forces.
- 1941 – World War II: Benghazi is conquered by the British Eighth Army.
- 1942 – World War II: French monarchist, Fernand Bonnier de La Chapelle, assassinates Vichy French Admiral François Darlan in Algiers, Algeria.
- 1943 – World War II: U.S. General Dwight D. Eisenhower is named Supreme Allied Commander for Operation Overlord.
- 1944 – World War II: The Belgian Troopship Leopoldville was torpedoed and sank with the loss of 763 soldiers and 56 crew.
- 1945 – Five of nine children become missing after their home in Fayetteville, West Virginia, is burned down.
- 1951 – Libya becomes independent. Idris I is proclaimed King of Libya.
- 1952 – First flight of Britain's Handley Page Victor strategic bomber.
- 1953 – Tangiwai disaster: In New Zealand's North Island, at Tangiwai, a railway bridge is damaged by a lahar and collapses beneath a passenger train, killing 151 people.
- 1955 – A flood devastates California, killing 74 people across portions of the state.
- 1964 – Vietnam War: Viet Cong operatives bomb the Brinks Hotel in Saigon, South Vietnam to demonstrate they can strike an American installation in the heavily guarded capital.
- 1964 – Flying Tiger Line Flight 282 crashes after takeoff from San Francisco International Airport, killing three.
- 1966 – A Canadair CL-44 chartered by the United States military crashes into a small village in South Vietnam, killing 111.
- 1968 – Apollo program: The crew of Apollo 8 enters into orbit around the Moon, becoming the first humans to do so. They performed ten lunar orbits, took the Earthrise photograph, broadcast live TV pictures, and read the first ten verses of Genesis.
- 1968 – Allegheny Airlines Flight 736 crashes on approach to Bradford Regional Airport, killing 20.
- 1969 – Nigerian troops capture Umuahia, the Biafran capital.
- 1971 – LANSA Flight 508 is struck by lightning and crashes in the Puerto Inca District in the Department of Huánuco in Peru, killing 91.
- 1973 – District of Columbia Home Rule Act is passed, allowing residents of Washington, D.C. to elect their own local government.
- 1974 – Cyclone Tracy devastates Darwin, Australia.
- 1979 – The first Ariane 1 rocket is launched from ELA-1 at the Guiana Space Centre.
- 1983 – Aeroflot Flight 601 crashes during takeoff from Leshukonskoye Airport, Russia, killing 44 of the 49 people on board.
- 1994 – Air France Flight 8969 is hijacked on the ground at Houari Boumediene Airport, Algiers, Algeria. Over the course of three days three passengers are killed, as are all four terrorists.
- 1996 – A Learjet 35 crashes into Smarts Mountain near Dorchester, New Hampshire, killing both pilots on board.
- 1997 – The Sid El-Antri massacre in Algeria kills between 50 and 100 people.
- 1999 – Indian Airlines Flight 814 is hijacked in Indian airspace between Kathmandu, Nepal, and Delhi, India. The aircraft landed at Kandahar in Afghanistan. The incident ended on December 31 with the release of 190 survivors (one passenger is killed).
- 2003 – The Spanish police thwart an attempt by ETA to detonate 50 kg of explosives at 3:55 p.m. inside Madrid's busy Chamartín Station.
- 2005 – Chad–Sudan relations: Chad declares a state of belligerence against Sudan following a December 18 attack on Adré, which left about 100 people dead.
- 2008 – The Lord's Resistance Army, a Ugandan rebel group, begins a series of attacks against civilians in the Democratic Republic of the Congo, massacring more than 400.
- 2018 – A helicopter crash kills Martha Érika Alonso, first female Governor of Puebla, Mexico, and her husband Rafael Moreno Valle Rosas, former governor.
- 2021 – Burmese military forces commit the Mo So massacre, killing at least 44 civilians.

== Births ==
=== Pre-1600 ===
- 3 BC – Galba, Roman emperor (died 69)
- 1166 – John, King of England (died 1216)
- 1389 – John V, Duke of Brittany (died 1442)
- 1474 – Bartolomeo degli Organi, Italian musician (died 1539)
- 1475 – Thomas Murner, German poet and translator (died 1537)
- 1508 – Pietro Carnesecchi, Italian scholar (died 1567)
- 1520 – Martha Leijonhufvud, Swedish noble (died 1584)
- 1537 – Willem IV van den Bergh, Stadtholder of Guelders and Zutphen (died 1586)
- 1549 – Kaspar Ulenberg, German theologian (died 1617)
- 1588 – Constance of Austria (died 1631)
- 1596 – Leonaert Bramer, Dutch painter (died 1674)
- 1597 – Honoré II, Prince of Monaco (died 1662)

=== 1601–1900 ===
- 1625 – Johann Rudolph Ahle, German organist, composer, and theorist (died 1673)
- 1634 – Mariana of Austria (died 1696)
- 1679 – Domenico Sarro, Italian composer and educator (died 1744)
- 1698 – William Warburton, English bishop (died 1779)
- 1726 – Johann Hartmann, Danish composer (died 1793)
- 1731 – Julie Bondeli, Swiss salonist and lady of letters (died 1778)
- 1754 – George Crabbe, English priest, surgeon, and poet (died 1832)
- 1761 – Selim III, Ottoman sultan (died 1808)
- 1761 – Jean-Louis Pons, French astronomer (died 1831)
- 1797 – Carl Georg von Wächter, German jurist (died 1880)
- 1798 – Adam Mickiewicz, Polish poet and playwright (died 1855)
- 1809 – Kit Carson, American general (died 1868)
- 1810 – Wilhelm Marstrand, Danish painter and illustrator (died 1873)
- 1812 – Karl Eduard Zachariae von Lingenthal, German lawyer and jurist (died 1894)
- 1818 – James Prescott Joule, English physicist and brewer (died 1889)
- 1822 – Matthew Arnold, English poet and critic (died 1888)
- 1822 – Charles Hermite, French mathematician (died 1901)
- 1827 – Alexander von Oettingen, German theologian and statistician (died 1905)
- 1837 – Empress Elisabeth of Austria (died 1898)
- 1843 – Lydia Koidula, Estonian poet and playwright (died 1886)
- 1845 – George I of Greece (died 1913)
- 1865 – Szymon Askenazy, Polish historian, educator, and diplomat, founded the Askenazy school (died 1935)
- 1867 – Tevfik Fikret, Turkish poet and educator (died 1915)
- 1868 – Charles Harvey Bollman, American naturalist (died 1889)
- 1868 – Emanuel Lasker, German chess player, mathematician, and philosopher (died 1941)
- 1869 – Henriette Roland Holst, Dutch poet, playwright, and politician (died 1952)
- 1872 – Frederick Semple, American golfer and tennis player (died 1927)
- 1875 – Émile Wegelin, French rower (died 1962)
- 1877 – Sigrid Schauman, Finnish painter and critic (died 1979)
- 1879 – Émile Nelligan, Canadian poet (died 1941)
- 1879 – Alexandrine of Mecklenburg-Schwerin (died 1952)
- 1880 – Johnny Gruelle, American author and illustrator (died 1939)
- 1881 – Charles Wakefield Cadman, American composer and critic (died 1946)
- 1882 – Hans Rebane, Estonian journalist and politician, 8th Estonian Minister of Foreign Affairs (died 1961)
- 1882 – Georges Legagneux, French aviator (died 1914)
- 1883 – Stefan Jaracz, Polish actor and producer (died 1945)
- 1885 – Paul Manship, American sculptor (died 1966)
- 1886 – Michael Curtiz, Hungarian-American actor, director, and producer (died 1962)
- 1887 – Louis Jouvet, French actor and producer (died 1951)
- 1887 – Axel Revold, Norwegian painter (died 1962)
- 1891 – Feodor Stepanovich Rojankovsky, Russian illustrator and painter (died 1970)
- 1892 – Ruth Chatterton, American actress (died 1961)
- 1893 – Harry Warren, American pianist and composer (died 1981)
- 1894 – Georges Guynemer, French captain and pilot (died 1917)
- 1894 – Jack Thayer, American businessman and Titanic survivor (died 1945)
- 1895 – E. Roland Harriman, American financier and philanthropist (died 1978)
- 1895 – Noel Streatfeild, English author (died 1986)
- 1895 – Marguerite Williams, American geologist (died 1991)
- 1897 – Ville Pörhölä, Finnish shot putter and discus thrower (died 1964)
- 1897 – Väinö Sipilä, Finnish runner (died 1987)
- 1898 – Baby Dodds, American drummer (died 1959)
- 1900 – Joey Smallwood, Canadian journalist and politician, 1st Premier of Newfoundland (died 1991)
- 1900 – Hawayo Takata, Japanese-American teacher and master practitioner of Reiki (died 1980)

=== 1901–present ===
- 1901 – Nina Negri, Argentine-French painter and engraver (died 1981)
- 1903 – Joseph Cornell, American sculptor and director (died 1972)
- 1903 – Ernst Krenkel, Polish-Russian geographer and explorer (died 1971)
- 1903 – Ava Helen Pauling, American humanitarian and activist (died 1981)
- 1904 – Joseph M. Juran, Romanian-American engineer and businessman (died 2008)
- 1905 – Howard Hughes, American businessman, engineer, and pilot (died 1976)
- 1906 – Franz Waxman, German-American composer and conductor (died 1967)
- 1907 – I. F. Stone, American journalist and author (died 1989)
- 1910 – Ellen Braumüller, German javelin thrower and triathlete (died 1991)
- 1910 – Fritz Leiber, American author and poet (died 1992)
- 1910 – Max Miedinger, Swiss typeface designer, created Helvetica (died 1980)
- 1913 – Ad Reinhardt, American painter and academic (died 1967)
- 1914 – Ralph Marterie, Italian-American trumpet player and bandleader (died 1978)
- 1914 – Herbert Reinecker, German author and screenwriter (died 2007)
- 1918 – Dave Bartholomew, American bandleader, composer and arranger (died 2019)
- 1919 – Qateel Shifai, Pakistani poet and songwriter (died 2001)
- 1919 – Pierre Soulages, French artist (died 2022)
- 1920 – Franco Lucentini, Italian author and screenwriter (died 2002)
- 1920 – Yevgeniya Rudneva, Ukrainian-Russian lieutenant and navigator (died 1944)
- 1922 – Ava Gardner, American actress (died 1990)
- 1923 – George Patton IV, American general (died 2004)
- 1923 – William C. Schneider, American aerospace engineer (died 1999)
- 1924 – Lee Dorsey, American singer-songwriter (died 1986)
- 1924 – Abdirizak Haji Hussein, Somalian soldier and politician, 4th Prime Minister of Somalia (died 2014)
- 1927 – Mary Higgins Clark, American author (died 2020)
- 1928 – Adam Exner, Canadian Roman Catholic prelate (died 2023)
- 1928 – Lev Vlassenko, Georgian-Australian pianist and educator (died 1996)
- 1929 – Lennart Skoglund, Swedish footballer (died 1975)
- 1929 – Red Sullivan, Canadian ice hockey player and coach (died 2019)
- 1930 – Robert Joffrey, American dancer and choreographer (died 1988)
- 1930 – John J. Kelley, American runner (died 2011)
- 1931 – Ray Bryant, American pianist and composer (died 2011)
- 1931 – Mauricio Kagel, Argentinian-German composer and scholar (died 2008)
- 1932 – Colin Cowdrey, Indian-English cricketer (died 2000)
- 1932 – On Kawara, Japanese-American painter (died 2014)
- 1934 – Stjepan Mesić, Croatian lawyer and politician, 2nd President of Croatia
- 1937 – Félix, Brazilian footballer and manager (died 2012)
- 1938 – Valentim Loureiro, Portuguese soldier and politician
- 1940 – Janet Carroll, American actress and singer (died 2012)
- 1940 – Anthony Fauci, American physician, Director of National Institute of Allergy and Infectious Diseases
- 1941 – Nel Beltrán Santamaría, Colombian Roman Catholic prelate (died 2025)
- 1942 – Indra Bania, Indian actor, director, and playwright (died 2015)
- 1942 – Jonathan Borofsky, American sculptor and painter
- 1942 – Đoàn Viết Hoạt, Vietnamese journalist, educator, and activist
- 1943 – Tarja Halonen, Finnish lawyer and politician, 11th President of Finland
- 1944 – Jan Erik Berntsen, Norwegian actor and singer (died 2025)
- 1944 – Mike Curb, American businessman and politician, 42nd Lieutenant Governor of California
- 1944 – Daniel Johnson, Jr., Canadian lawyer and politician, 25th Premier of Quebec
- 1944 – Erhard Keller, German speed skater
- 1944 – Woody Shaw, American trumpeter (died 1989)
- 1945 – Lemmy, English hard rock singer-songwriter and bass player (died 2015)
- 1945 – Nicholas Meyer, American screenwriter, film director, and author
- 1946 – Jan Akkerman, Dutch rock guitarist and songwriter
- 1946 – Jeff Sessions, American lawyer and politician, 44th Attorney General of Alabama and 84th Attorney General of the United States
- 1947 – Kevin Sheedy, Australian footballer and coach
- 1948 – Stan Bowles, English footballer and sportscaster (died 2024)
- 1948 – Frank Oliver, New Zealand rugby player and coach (died 2014)
- 1948 – Antoni Pietkiewicz, Polish engineer, businessperson and politician
- 1949 – Warwick Brown, Australian racing driver
- 1950 – Dana Gioia, American poet and critic
- 1950 – Libby Larsen, American composer
- 1950 – Tommy Turtle, British soldier (died 2020)
- 1953 – Timothy Carhart, American actor
- 1954 – Yves Debay, Congolese-French commander and journalist (died 2013)
- 1954 – José María Figueres, Costa Rican businessman and politician, President of Costa Rica (1994–1998)
- 1955 – Grand L. Bush, American actor
- 1955 – Scott Fischer, American mountaineer and guide (died 1996)
- 1955 – Clarence Gilyard, American actor and educator (died 2022)
- 1956 – Shim Hwa-jin, South Korean academic and educator
- 1956 – Anil Kapoor, Indian actor and producer
- 1957 – Hamid Karzai, Afghan politician, 12th President of Afghanistan
- 1958 – Munetaka Higuchi, Japanese drummer and producer (died 2008)
- 1958 – Diane Tell, Canadian singer-songwriter and guitarist
- 1959 – Lee Daniels, American director and producer
- 1960 – Glenn McQueen, Canadian-American animator (died 2002)
- 1960 – Carol Vorderman, Welsh television host
- 1961 – Ilham Aliyev, Azerbaijani businessman and politician, 4th President of Azerbaijan
- 1961 – Mary Barra, American businesswoman, current CEO and chairwoman of General Motors
- 1961 – Eriko Kitagawa, Japanese director and screenwriter
- 1961 – Wade Williams, American actor
- 1962 – Kate Spade, American fashion designer (died 2018)
- 1963 – Caroline Aherne, English actress, producer, and screenwriter (died 2016)
- 1963 – Jay Bilas, American basketball player and sportscaster
- 1963 – Timo Jutila, Finnish ice hockey player and sportscaster
- 1963 – Mary Ramsey, American singer-songwriter and violinist
- 1964 – Mark Valley, American actor
- 1966 – Diedrich Bader, American actor
- 1967 – Mikhail Shchennikov, Russian race walker
- 1967 – Pernilla Wahlgren, Swedish singer and actress
- 1968 – Marleen Renders, Belgian runner
- 1969 – Milan Blagojevic, Australian footballer and manager
- 1969 – Pernille Fischer Christensen, Danish director and screenwriter
- 1969 – Ed Miliband, British politician, Foreign Secretary
- 1969 – Luis Musrri, Chilean footballer and manager
- 1969 – Oleg Skripochka, Russian astronaut and engineer
- 1969 – Gintaras Staučė, Lithuanian footballer and manager
- 1970 – Amaury Nolasco, Puerto Rican actor
- 1971 – Geoff Allott, New Zealand cricketer
- 1971 – Ricky Martin, Puerto Rican singer-songwriter and actor
- 1972 – Álvaro Mesén, Costa Rican footballer
- 1973 – Liu Dong, Chinese-Spanish runner
- 1973 – Stephenie Meyer, American author and film producer
- 1973 – Ali Salem Tamek, Moroccan activist
- 1974 – Thure Lindhardt, Danish actor
- 1974 – Paal Nilssen-Love, Norwegian drummer and composer
- 1974 – Marcelo Salas, Chilean footballer
- 1974 – Ryan Seacrest, American radio host and television personality, and producer
- 1976 – Linda Ferga, French hurdler
- 1977 – Michael Raymond-James, American actor
- 1978 – Yıldıray Baştürk, German-Turkish footballer
- 1978 – Heinrich Himmer, Austrian politician
- 1980 – Stephen Appiah, Ghanaian footballer
- 1980 – Maarja-Liis Ilus, Estonian pop musician
- 1981 – Dima Bilan, Russian singer-songwriter and actor
- 1983 – Gregor Blanco, Venezuelan baseball player
- 1983 – Tim Jennings, American football player
- 1984 – Isaac De Gois, Australian rugby league player
- 1984 – Austin Stowell, American actor
- 1985 – Alexey Dmitriev, German ice hockey player
- 1986 – Kyrylo Fesenko, Ukrainian basketball player
- 1987 – Jane Summersett, American ice dancer
- 1988 – Stefanos Athanasiadis, Greek footballer
- 1988 – Emre Özkan, Turkish footballer
- 1988 – Simon Zenke, Nigerian footballer
- 1989 – Matt Calvert, Canadian ice hockey player
- 1990 – Brigetta Barrett, American high jumper
- 1991 – Sofia Black-D'Elia, American actress
- 1991 – Lara Michel, Swiss tennis player
- 1991 – Eric Moreland, American basketball player
- 1991 – Louis Tomlinson, English singer
- 1991 – Taylor Zakhar Perez, American actor
- 1992 – Davante Adams, American football player
- 1992 – Serge Aurier, Ivorian footballer
- 1992 – P. J. Hairston, American basketball player
- 1994 – Han Seung-woo, South Korean singer
- 1995 – Anett Kontaveit, Estonian tennis player
- 1997 – Neeraj Chopra, Indian javelin thrower
- 1997 – William Contreras, Venezuelan baseball player
- 1998 – Alexis Mac Allister, Argentine footballer
- 2001 – Choi Sung-beom, South Korean football player
- 2002 – Joshua Primo, Canadian basketball player
- 2002 – Jeremiah Trotter Jr., American football player

== Deaths ==
=== Pre-1600 ===
- 36 – Gongsun Shu, emperor of Chengjia
- 427 – Archbishop Sisinnius I of Constantinople
- 903 – Hedwiga, duchess of Saxony
- 950 – Shi Hongzhao, Chinese general
- 950 – Wang Zhang, Chinese official
- 950 – Yang Bin, Chinese chancellor
- 1193 – Roger III of Sicily (born 1175)
- 1257 – John I, Count of Hainaut (born 1218)
- 1263 – Hōjō Tokiyori, regent of Japan (born 1227)
- 1281 – Henry V of Luxembourg (born 1216)
- 1449 – Walter Bower, Scottish chronicler (born 1385)
- 1453 – John Dunstaple, English composer (born 1390)
- 1456 – Đurađ Branković, Despot of Serbia (born 1377)
- 1473 – John Cantius, Polish scholar and theologian (born 1390)
- 1524 – Vasco da Gama, Portuguese explorer and politician, Governor of Portuguese India (born 1469)
- 1541 – Andreas Karlstadt, Christian theologian and reformer (born 1486)

=== 1601–1900 ===
- 1635 – Hester Jonas, German nurse (born 1570)
- 1660 – Mary, Princess Royal and Princess of Orange (born 1631)
- 1707 – Noël Coypel, French painter and educator (born 1628)
- 1813 – Empress Go-Sakuramachi of Japan (born 1740)
- 1844 – Friedrich Bernhard Westphal, Danish-German painter (born 1803)
- 1863 – William Makepeace Thackeray, English author and poet (born 1811)
- 1865 – Charles Lock Eastlake, English painter and historian (born 1793)
- 1867 – José Mariano Salas, Mexican general and politician. President of Mexico (1846, 1859) and regent of the Second Mexican Empire (born 1797)
- 1868 – Adolphe d'Archiac, French paleontologist and geologist (born 1802)
- 1872 – William John Macquorn Rankine, Scottish physicist and engineer (born 1820)
- 1873 – Johns Hopkins, American businessman and philanthropist (born 1795)
- 1879 – Anna Bochkoltz, German operatic soprano, voice teacher and composer (born 1815)
- 1889 – Jan Jakob Lodewijk ten Kate, Dutch pastor and poet (born 1819)
- 1893 – B. T. Finniss, Australian politician, 1st Premier of South Australia (born 1807)
- 1898 – Charbel Makhluf, Lebanese priest and saint (born 1828)

=== 1901–present ===
- 1908 – James C. Corrigan, Canadian-American businessman (born 1846)
- 1914 – John Muir, Scottish-American geologist, botanist, and author, founded Sierra Club (born 1838)
- 1920 – Stephen Mosher Wood, American lieutenant and politician (born 1832)
- 1923 – Joe Lacey, Irish Hunger Striker died during the 1923 Irish hunger strikes (born 1895)
- 1926 – Wesley Coe, American shot putter, hammer thrower, and discus thrower (born 1879)
- 1931 – Carlo Fornasini, micropalaeontologist (born 1854)
- 1931 – Flying Hawk, American warrior, educator and historian (born 1854)
- 1935 – Alban Berg, Austrian composer and educator (born 1885)
- 1938 – Bruno Taut, German architect and urban planner (born 1880)
- 1941 – Siegfried Alkan, German composer (born 1858)
- 1942 – François Darlan, French admiral and politician, 122nd Prime Minister of France (born 1881)
- 1945 – Josephine Sabel, American singer and comedian (born 1866)
- 1947 – Charles Gondouin, French rugby player and tug of war competitor (born 1875)
- 1957 – Norma Talmadge, American actress and producer (born 1894)
- 1961 – Robert Hillyer, American poet and academic (born 1895)
- 1962 – Wilhelm Ackermann, German mathematician (born 1896)
- 1962 – Eveline Adelheid von Maydell, German illustrator (born 1890)
- 1964 – Claudia Jones, Trinidad-British journalist and activist (born 1915)
- 1965 – John Black, English businessman (born 1895)
- 1965 – William M. Branham, American minister and theologian (born 1906)
- 1967 – Burt Baskin, American businessman, co-founded Baskin-Robbins (born 1913)
- 1969 – Stanisław Błeszyński, Polish-German entomologist and lepidopterist (born 1927)
- 1969 – Cortelia Clark, American singer-songwriter and guitarist (born 1907)
- 1969 – Olivia FitzRoy, English soldier and author (born 1921)
- 1969 – Alfred B. Skar, Norwegian journalist and politician (born 1896)
- 1971 – Maria Koepcke, German-Peruvian ornithologist and zoologist (born 1924)
- 1972 – Gisela Richter, English-American archaeologist and historian (born 1882)
- 1973 – Fritz Gause, German historian and author (born 1893)
- 1975 – Bernard Herrmann, American composer and conductor (born 1911)
- 1977 – Samael Aun Weor, Colombian author and educator (born 1917)
- 1980 – Karl Dönitz, German admiral and politician, President of Germany (born 1891)
- 1982 – Louis Aragon, French author and poet (born 1897)
- 1984 – Peter Lawford, English-American actor (born 1923)
- 1985 – Robert Todd Lincoln Beckwith, American lawyer (born 1904)
- 1985 – Camille Tourville, Canadian-American wrestler and manager (born 1927)
- 1986 – Gardner Fox, American author (born 1911)
- 1987 – Joop den Uyl, Dutch journalist, economist, and politician, 45th Prime Minister of the Netherlands (born 1919)
- 1987 – M. G. Ramachandran, Sri Lankan-Indian actor, producer, and politician, 5th Chief Minister of Tamil Nadu (born 1917)
- 1988 – Jainendra Kumar, Indian author (born 1905)
- 1990 – Thorbjørn Egner, Norwegian playwright and songwriter (born 1922)
- 1991 – Virginia Sorensen, American author (born 1912)
- 1992 – Bobby LaKind, American singer-songwriter and conga player (born 1945)
- 1992 – James Mathews, Australian rugby league player (born 1968)
- 1992 – Peyo, Belgian cartoonist, created The Smurfs (born 1928)
- 1993 – Norman Vincent Peale, American minister and author (born 1898)
- 1994 – John Boswell, American historian, author, and academic (born 1947)
- 1994 – Rossano Brazzi, Italian actor (born 1916)
- 1997 – James Komack, American actor, director, producer, and screenwriter (born 1930)
- 1997 – Toshiro Mifune, Chinese-Japanese actor and producer (born 1920)
- 1997 – Pierre Péladeau, Canadian businessman, founded Quebecor (born 1925)
- 1998 – Syl Apps, Canadian ice hockey player and pole vaulter (born 1915)
- 1999 – Bill Bowerman, American runner, coach, and businessman, co-founded Nike, Inc. (born 1911)
- 1999 – Maurice Couve de Murville, French soldier and politician, 152nd Prime Minister of France (born 1907)
- 1999 – João Figueiredo, Brazilian general and politician, 30th President of Brazil (born 1918)
- 1999 – William C. Schneider, American aerospace engineer (born 1923)
- 2000 – John Cooper, English businessman, co-founded the Cooper Car Company (born 1923)
- 2002 – Kjell Aukrust, Norwegian author and poet (born 1920)
- 2002 – Jake Thackray, English singer-songwriter and guitarist (born 1938)
- 2004 – Johnny Oates, American baseball player, coach, and manager (born 1946)
- 2006 – Braguinha, Brazilian singer-songwriter and producer (born 1907)
- 2006 – Kenneth Sivertsen, Norwegian guitarist and composer (born 1961)
- 2006 – Frank Stanton, American businessman (born 1908)
- 2007 – Nicholas Pumfrey, English lawyer and judge (born 1951)
- 2007 – George Warrington, American businessman (born 1952)
- 2008 – Ralph Harris, British journalist (born 1921)
- 2008 – Harold Pinter, English playwright, screenwriter, director, Nobel Prize laureate (born 1930)
- 2009 – Marcus Bakker, Dutch journalist and politician (born 1923)
- 2009 – Rafael Caldera, Venezuelan lawyer and politician, 65th President of Venezuela (born 1916)
- 2009 – George Michael, American sportscaster (born 1939)
- 2009 – Gero von Wilpert, German author and academic (born 1933)
- 2010 – Elisabeth Beresford, English journalist and author (born 1926)
- 2010 – Frans de Munck, Dutch footballer and manager (born 1922)
- 2010 – Orestes Quércia, Brazilian journalist, lawyer, and politician, 28th Governor of São Paulo State (born 1938)
- 2010 – Eino Tamberg, Estonian composer and educator (born 1930)
- 2011 – Johannes Heesters, Dutch-German entertainer (born 1903)
- 2012 – Richard Rodney Bennett, English-American composer and academic (born 1936)
- 2012 – Charles Durning, American soldier and actor (born 1923)
- 2012 – Jack Klugman, American actor (born 1922)
- 2012 – Dennis O'Driscoll, Irish poet and critic (born 1954)
- 2013 – Frédéric Back, German-Canadian director, animator, and screenwriter (born 1924)
- 2013 – Ian Barbour, Chinese-American author and scholar (born 1923)
- 2013 – John M. Goldman, English haematologist and oncologist (born 1938)
- 2013 – Allan McKeown, English-American screenwriter and producer (born 1946)
- 2014 – Buddy DeFranco, American clarinet player (born 1923)
- 2014 – Edward Greenspan, Canadian lawyer and author (born 1944)
- 2014 – Herbert Harris, American lawyer and politician (born 1926)
- 2014 – Krzysztof Krauze, Polish director and screenwriter (born 1953)
- 2015 – Turid Birkeland, Norwegian businesswoman and politician, Norwegian Minister of Culture (born 1962)
- 2015 – Letty Jimenez Magsanoc, Filipino journalist (born 1941)
- 2015 – Adriana Olguín, Chilean lawyer and politician, Chilean Minister of Justice (born 1911)
- 2016 – Rick Parfitt, British musician (born 1948)
- 2016 – Liz Smith, English actress (born 1921)
- 2016 – Richard Adams, English author (born 1920)
- 2016 – Ben Xi, Chinese singer (born 1994)
- 2017 – Jerry Kindall, American baseball player and coach (born 1935)
- 2017 – Heather Menzies, Canadian-American model and actress (born 1949)
- 2018 – Martha Érika Alonso, Governor of Puebla (born 1973)
- 2018 – Rafael Moreno Valle Rosas, former governor of Puebla (born 1968)
- 2023 – Cheri Barry, American politician and mayor of Meridian, Mississippi (born 1955)
- 2023 – Richard Bowes, American science fiction author (born 1944)
- 2023 – Troy Dargan, Cook Islands rugby league footballer (born 1997)
- 2024 – Hudson Meek, American actor (born 2008)
- 2024 – Richard Perry, American record producer (born 1942)

== Holidays and observances ==
- Christian feast day:
  - Adela and Irmina
  - Paola Elisabetta Cerioli
  - Adam and Eve
  - December 24 (Eastern Orthodox liturgics)
- Christmas Eve (Christianity) and its related observances:
  - Aðfangadagskvöld, the day when the 13th and the last Yule Lad arrives to towns. (Iceland)
  - Feast of the Seven Fishes (Italian Americans)
  - Juleaften (Denmark)/Julaften (Norway)/Julafton (Sweden)
  - Nittel Nacht (certain Orthodox Jewish denominations)
  - Nochebuena (Spain and Spanish-speaking countries)
  - The Declaration of Christmas Peace (Old Great Square of Turku, Finland's official Christmas City)
  - Wigilia (Poland)
  - Quviasukvik, the Inuit new year (Alaska, Canada, Greenland and Russia)
  - Kūčios (Lithuania)
- Independence Day (Libya)
- Day of Military Honour – Siege of Ismail (Russia)
