= Dmitrieva =

Dmitrieva or Dmitriyeva is a Russian surname. Notable people with the surname include:

- Anna Dmitrieva (born 1940), tennis player
- Daria Dmitrieva (born 1995), handball player
- Darya Dmitriyeva (born 1993), rhythmic gymnast
- Olga Dmitrieva (born 1981), triathlete
- Tatyana Dmitrieva (1951–2010), psychiatrist and health minister
- Valentina Dmitryeva (1859–1947), writer
- Yelena Dmitriyeva (born 1983), handball player

== See also ==
- Cherubina de Gabriak, literary pseudonym of Elisaveta Ivanovna Dmitrieva
- Dmitriyev (disambiguation)
