= Dmitriyev =

Dmitriyev or Dmitriev (Russian: Дми́триев) is a common Russian surname that is derived from the male given name Dmitry and literally means Dmitry's. It may refer to:

- Aleksandr Dmitriyev (conductor) (born 1935), Russian conductor
- Alexey Dmitriev (born 1985), Russian ice hockey player
- Andrei Dmitriev (born 1979), Russian political dissident, publicist.
- Andrei Dmitriev (born 1956), Russian writer
- Artur Dmitriev (1968–2026), Russian Olympic champion in figure skating
- Dmitri Dmitrijev (born 1982), Estonian politician
- Dmitriy Dmitriyev (born 1983), Russian professional football player
- Georgy Dmitriyev (1942–2016), a Russian composer
- Igor Dmitriev (1927–2008), Russian actor
- Ivan Dmitriev (1760–1837), Russian poet
- Ivan Dmitriev (canoeist) (born 1998), Russian canoeist
- Matvey Dmitriev-Mamonov (1790–1863), Russian poet, public and military figure
- Maxim Dmitriyev (1913–1990), Soviet army officer and Hero of the Soviet Union
- Mikhail Gennadiyevich Dmitriyev (born 1947), Soviet and Russian mathematician
- Nikolai Dmitriev (1829–1893), Russian composer
- Nikolai Dmitriev (1898–1954), Soviet linguist
- Nikolai Dmitriev-Orenburgsky (1838–1898), Russian painter
- Sergey Igorevich Dmitriyev (1964–2022), Russian football coach and player
- Sergey Viktorovich Dmitriev (born 1979), Russian historian and sinologist
- Serhiy Dmytriyev (born 1978), Ukrainian football player.
- V. Dmitriev, soloist with the Alexandrov Ensemble
- Vladimir Dmitriyev (1900–1948), Soviet theater designer and painter
- Vladimir Karpovich Dmitriev (1868–1913), Russian economist, mathematician and statistician
- Yury Dmitriyev (1911–2006), Soviet theater and art critic
- Yury Dmitriyev (born 1946), Soviet cyclist
- Yury A. Dmitriev (born 1956), rights activist and Gulag historian
