= Vyacheslav Molodin =

Soviet-Russian archaeologist (born 1948)

- Вячеслав Молодин
- Born: 26 September 1948 (age 78); Moscow, Soviet Union
- Education: Novosibirsk State Pedagogical Institute
- Occupations: Archaeologist, historian
- Employer: Institute of Archaeology and Ethnography SB RAS
- Awards: (2004)
- Scientific career
- Fields: Archeology, history
- Doctoral advisor: Alexey Okladnikov; Tatyana Troitskaya

Vyacheslav Ivanovich Molodin (Russian: Вячеслав Иванович Молодин; born 26 September 1948) is a Soviet and Russian archaeologist specializing in prehistory of Siberia, professor, academician of the RAS.

== Biography ==
He was born on 26 September 1948 in the village of Orekhovo, Domachevsky District, Brest Oblast, BSSR

At first, Molodin wanted to become a naval aviator, but he was forced to abandon these plans. During a meeting of the Geographical Society in Novosibirsk, he listened to the lecture of Alexey Okladnikov. The notable archeologist fascinated young Molodin. As a result, this lecture became decisive factor in choosing his profession.

In 1971, the future scientist graduated from the Novosibirsk State Pedagogical Institute. He worked as a deputy director of a secondary school.

In 1973, Molodin started working at the Institute of History, Philology and Philosophy, as a graduate student and junior researcher, and in 1983, he became the head of the sector of this institution. In 1992, after reorganization the IHPP into the Institute of Archaeology and Ethnography, he took the position of deputy director.

From 1992 to 1998, he was the head of the department of archeology and ethnography of the Faculty of Humanities in Novosibirsk State University.

In 1996, the scientist was elected a corresponding member of the German Archaeological Institute.

In 1997 the archeologist became the Deputy Chairman of the SB RAS.

He is a member of the Presidium of the RAS (since 2002).

In 2013, Molodin became a corresponding member of the Shanghai Archaeological Science Forum.

== Activities ==
The scientist studies objects of primitive art, their chronology and conducts a semantic reconstruction of these objects, he researches burial and settlement complexes from the Neolithic to the late Middle Ages. His areas of interest include ethnography, staurography and problems of the history of science, as well as the use of interdisciplinary approaches in archeology.

His additions and refinements to the periodization for the cultures of the Baraba steppe between the Early Bronze and the Developed Bronze Ages subsequently received stratigraphic confirmation. He showed that during the Developed Bronze, a rather motley ethnocultural picture began formed here, which became even more complicated during the period of the Late Bronze Age and the transition period between the Bronze Age and the Iron Age.

Molodin also contributed in the study of Pazyryk culture.

In 1979, he discovered the archeological site Chichaburg in Zdvinsky District of Novosibirsk Oblast.

In 2015, a team led by Molodon discovered a complex consisting of two dwellings and several pits for harvesting of fish. Molodin's team of archeologists suggested that theses artifacts belong to an unknown culture (Baraba culture) of the Early Neolithic period (7th millennium BC), while other scientists argued that the archeological finds are the traces of Boborykin culture (5th millennium BC). Two independent examinations of animal bones from pit for harvesting of fish carried out at the Centre of Collective Usage (Novosibirsk) and the Engelhorn Archeometry Centre (Mannheim) confirmed the correctness of dating the complex to the 7th millennium BC.

== Awards ==
Molodin awarded the Jubilee Medal "300 Years of the Russian Navy" (1996), Order of Friendship (1999), Medal of Friendship (Mongolia, 2006), Order of Honour (2007), Order of Merit of the Federal Republic of Germany first class (2012), Order "For Merit to the Fatherland" IV degree (2014).

He was honored with the Alexander Karpinsky Award (2000) and State Prize of the Russian Federation (2005).
