= Murders of Lauria Bible and Ashley Freeman =

Murder of two American teens

- Date: December 29 or December 30, 1999
- Location: Welch, Oklahoma, U.S.
- Deaths: Kathy Freeman: Danny Freeman
- Missing: Lauria Jaylene Bible: Ashley Renae Freeman
- Arrests: Ronnie Dean Busick
- Accused: Ronnie Dean Busick: Warren Phillip Welch II (d. 2007); David Pennington (d. 2015)
- Charges: First-degree murder (four counts)

Lauria Jaylene Bible (/ˈlɔːrə/; born April 18, 1983) and Ashley Renae Freeman (born December 29, 1983) were American teenagers who disappeared between the evening of December 29 and the early morning hours of December 30, 1999, from Freeman's home in Welch, Oklahoma.

Firefighters arrived at the Freeman home shortly after 5:30 a.m. on December 30, when a motorist reported a fire at the residence. After the fire had been extinguished, the bodies of Freeman's parents, Danny and Kathy, were recovered. Both had been shot to death at close range. However, law enforcement was unable to find any trace of Bible or Freeman in the rubble of the home.

On April 26, 2018, it was reported that Ronnie Dean Busick was being charged with four counts of first-degree murder in the killings of Bible and the Freeman family. In 2020, Busick pleaded guilty to accessory to murder and was sentenced to 10 years in prison plus five years of probation. He was released on May 19, 2023, after serving just 38 months.

On October 7, 2021, a new search was conducted in the root cellar of a home formerly occupied by David Pennington, one of the deceased suspects accused by the convicted Busick. Investigators claim that Busick kept repeating "the root cellar," and his stepdaughter alleged that he had forbidden anyone from accessing it. News reports after the search wrapped up indicated it had been yet another dead end.

== Disappearance ==
On December 29, 1999, high school friends Lauria Bible and Ashley Freeman of Welch, Oklahoma spent the evening together celebrating Freeman's 16th birthday. Bible had received permission from her parents to spend the night at the Freeman home, with her father stating that he told her “you need to be home by noon” the following day. The girl then left her parents’ home, saying “I love you, Daddy” to her father. Earlier that day, the girls had spent time at a local pizzeria with Freeman's mother, Kathy.

At approximately 5:30 a.m. on December 30, 1999, a passing motorist called 9-1-1 reporting that the Freeman home was engulfed in flames. Law enforcement determined the fire had been an arson. Inside the home, the charred remains of Kathy were discovered lying on the floor of her bedroom; she had been shot in the head. Initially, no other remains were located, leading local law enforcement to extrapolate that Ashley's father, Danny Freeman, had slain his wife and fled with both girls. Bible's parked car was in the driveway of the home with the keys in the ignition.

On December 31, 1999, Bible's parents, Lorene and Jay, returned to the scene, hoping to find any additional clues that law enforcement may have missed. While walking around the extensive rubble, they discovered what appeared to be the shape of another body and, upon looking closer, notified the police. The second body was determined to be that of Danny; like his wife, he had also been shot in the head execution-style. According to Lorene, from what she could see on the scene, the body “had no face”. Following this discovery, the crime scene was reexamined, yet no sign of Bible or Freeman was found. In 2010, the Freeman family initiated court proceedings to have Ashley declared legally dead.

== Investigation ==
=== Suspects and confessions ===
In the decade following the disappearance of Bible and Freeman, two convicted killers—Tommy Lynn Sells and Jeremy Jones—confessed to murdering them, but subsequently recanted their admissions. Jones had claimed that he murdered Freeman's parents as a favor for a friend over a drug debt, then took the girls to Kansas, where he shot them and threw their bodies into an abandoned mine. Searches of the mine Jones identified proved fruitless, however, and Jones subsequently admitted he had fabricated the story in order to get better food and additional phone privileges in prison.

In a 2001 profile on Unsolved Mysteries, it was mentioned that rumors had circulated among locals that the Craig County Police Department had been feuding with the Freemans at the time over the death of their son, Shane, who was shot by a deputy after stealing a car. While his death was ruled justifiable, the Freemans had threatened to file a wrongful death lawsuit. Danny's brother, Dwayne, claimed that Danny had confided that deputies had tried to intimidate him.

=== Arrest and conviction of Ronnie Busick ===
In April 2018, it was reported that Ronnie Dean Busick, then aged 66, had been arrested and charged with four counts of first-degree murder in connection with the deaths of Bible and the Freeman family. Two other, albeit deceased, suspects were named as well: Warren Phillip "Phil" Welch II (d. 2007) and David Pennington (d. 2015). According to The Washington Post, "at least a dozen" witnesses claimed all three men bragged about raping and murdering Bible and Freeman and having taken Polaroid photographs of them. Several witnesses alleged that the three men killed the Freemans over drug money, and that the girls were held captive in Welch's trailer for several days before being murdered.

A female witness who lived with Welch a short time after the disappearances provided a sworn affidavit that "she heard conversations between the three men where they disclosed that the murder victims had owed them money," and that Welch kept a briefcase containing the Polaroid photos which showed both girls "bound and gagged with duct tape and lying on a bed," with Welch lying next to the girls in some of the photographs. According to the affidavit, Welch, Pennington, and Busick had claimed to have raped and tortured the girls before disposing of their remains "in a pit" or mine shaft in Picher, Oklahoma. Law enforcement also stated they believed the girls' remains could have been "dumped in a cellar that was later covered in concrete."

In a public address, the Bible family issued a statement in which they stated they had been aware of the alleged photographs "for years," and that "At this time all focus is on finding Lauria and Ashley. We welcome all information leading to their recovery. Until they are home with us, this will never be over." After his arrest, Busick told reporters he wished to speak to the Bibles. On April 26, 2018, Bible's mother, Lorene, confirmed she spoke with Busick, but that he denied knowing the whereabouts of her daughter or Freeman.

Busick entered a plea of guilty on July 15, 2020, to being an accessory to first-degree murder in the deaths of Danny and Kathy Freeman, the torching of their home near Welch, Oklahoma, and the abduction and presumed slayings of the two girls. He admitted having withheld information about the involvement of Welch and Pennington. He was sentenced to 15 years for the crime, ten of those years to be spent in prison, plus five years of probation.

The Oklahoma Department of Corrections (DOC) had said Busick was considered a “level-4” prisoner; i.e., he was known for being respectful to the prison staff and following their orders, while staying to himself and not being known as a problematic inmate. Furthermore, a level-4 inmate does not already have an extensive criminal history beyond their current conviction, despite Busick having criminal convictions dating back to the 1980s. Busick received 60 credits/month, or two days’ worth of credit for every day served, plus the credit for time he served in jail. Ultimately, Busick's positive track record while behind bars led to an early release, for good behavior; he was released on May 19, 2023, after serving just 38 months of his 10-year sentence.

== Media coverage ==
The disappearances of Bible and Freeman were profiled on America's Most Wanted in 2000, and on Unsolved Mysteries in 2001. The case was later featured on the series Vanished with Beth Holloway. In 2013, it was profiled on the documentary series Disappeared on Investigation Discovery.

In September 2018, one of the main witnesses in the case against Ronnie Busick, as well as the cold case investigators who filed the charges, gave their first interviews to the Tulsa World for a special report.

The case was featured in a new four-part series on HLN titled Hell In The Heartland starting June 2, 2019, which hoped to shed more light on the disappearances of the girls and the main suspects. The show was hosted by the creator of the show and crime writer Jax Miller, who also wrote a book on the girls' disappearances. Released in July 2020, it is titled Hell in the Heartland: Murder, Meth and the case of Two Missing Girls.

On Jun 7, 2021, People Magazine Investigates profiled the case with the episode Bible Belt Massacre.

In February 2026, an episode of the Casefile true crime podcast series covered this case: Casefile Archives 5: Laura Bible & Ashley Freeman, which is an updated production of Case 03: Laura Bible & Ashley Freeman.

== See also ==
- Crime in Oklahoma
- List of solved missing person cases (1990s)
- Little Girl Lost: The Delimar Vera Story, based on an actual child who disappeared in Philadelphia in 1997; the kidnapper set a fire to cover her action and the fire department falsely declared her dead
- Sodder children disappearance, five children not found in remains of 1945 West Virginia house fire; parents believed they had been kidnapped prior to fire being set and set up a billboard at the site of the house seeking information.
