= Sergey Dmitriyev =

Sergey Dmitriyev or Dmitriev is the name of

- Sergey Igorevich Dmitriyev (1964–2022), Russian football coach and player
- Sergey Viktorovich Dmitriev (born 1979), Russian historian and sinologist
- Sergey Vitalievich Dmitriev (born 1966), Russian businessman

== See also ==
- Serhiy Dmytriyev (born 1978), Ukrainian footballer
