= Little Girl Lost: The Delimar Vera Story =

- Written by: Christopher Canaan; Maria Nation
- Directed by: Paul A. Kaufman
- Starring: Judy Reyes; Ana Ortiz; A Martinez; Hector Luis Bustamante; Marlene Forte
- Country of origin: United States

Production
- Producers: Larry A. Thompson; Harvey Kahn
- Editor: Lisa Binkley

Original release
- Network: LMN
- Release: August 17, 2008

Little Girl Lost: The Delimar Vera Story is a 2008 original LMN movie, starring Judy Reyes, Ana Ortiz, and A Martinez. Based on real events, the film follows the events surrounding the kidnapping and rescue of Delimar Vera, the newborn daughter of Luz Cuevas and Pedro Vera.

== Plot ==
The film depicts the struggle of Luz Cuevas (Judy Reyes) to find her baby daughter, Delimar Vera Cuevas, who disappeared in 1997 after their house caught fire during a party, just ten days after she was born. The police reported that Delimar was killed in the fire. However, Cuevas suspects that she was kidnapped and that the fire was staged by an outsider. As a result, her husband, Pedro Vera (Hector Luis Bustamante), becomes estranged from her. Six years after the fire, Cuevas meets Valerie Valleja (Ana Ortiz), former wife of one of Pedro's cousins, who was also at the party on the day of the fire. She has a six-year-old girl with her, named Aaliyah. The girl bears a resemblance to Cuevas and she suspects it is Delimar. Cuevas begins an investigation into Valleja, and finds out through a DNA test that Aaliyah is in fact Delimar. Valerie is arrested and Aaliyah/Delimar is returned to her family.

== Actual events ==
As depicted in the film, the daughter of Luz Cuevas and Pedro Vera, Delimar Vera was taken by Carolyn Correa (depicted in the film as Valerie Valleja), a distant friend of Pedro's cousin. On December 15, 1997, Correa deliberately ignited a fire in Cuevas's house in Philadelphia to cover up the incident. After Correa took the girl, she raised her as her own daughter under the name of Aaliyah, while Delimar's disappearance was attributed to the intense fire in the room.

Six years later, on January 18, 2004, Cuevas attended a birthday party for an acquaintance after being invited in 2003 and was surprised by her own resemblance to a 6-year-old girl. With the help of a state representative, Cuevas managed to get a series of DNA tests which resulted in a confirmation of Cuevas's maternity over Delimar. Correa was arrested in 2004, and taken to trial, and placed on $1 million bail. Entering a plea of nolo contendere, she was accused and found guilty of kidnapping, arson, and attempted murder, and was sentenced to nine to thirty years in prison in 2005. Correa became eligible for parole in 2014.

== See also ==
- Murders of Lauria Bible and Ashley Freeman, two teenage girls whose remains were not found after a 1999 Oklahoma fire destroyed Freeman's home while Bible was sleeping over; Freeman's parents were found to have been killed before the fire. In 2018 it was learned that they had been taken alive and held in captivity for several days before dying, leading to a 2020 conviction of the surviving murderer.
- Sodder children disappearance, five children not found in remains of 1945 West Virginia house fire; parents believed they had been kidnapped prior to fire being set and set up a billboard at the site of the house seeking information.
