= Hector Luis Bustamante =

Colombian-American actor

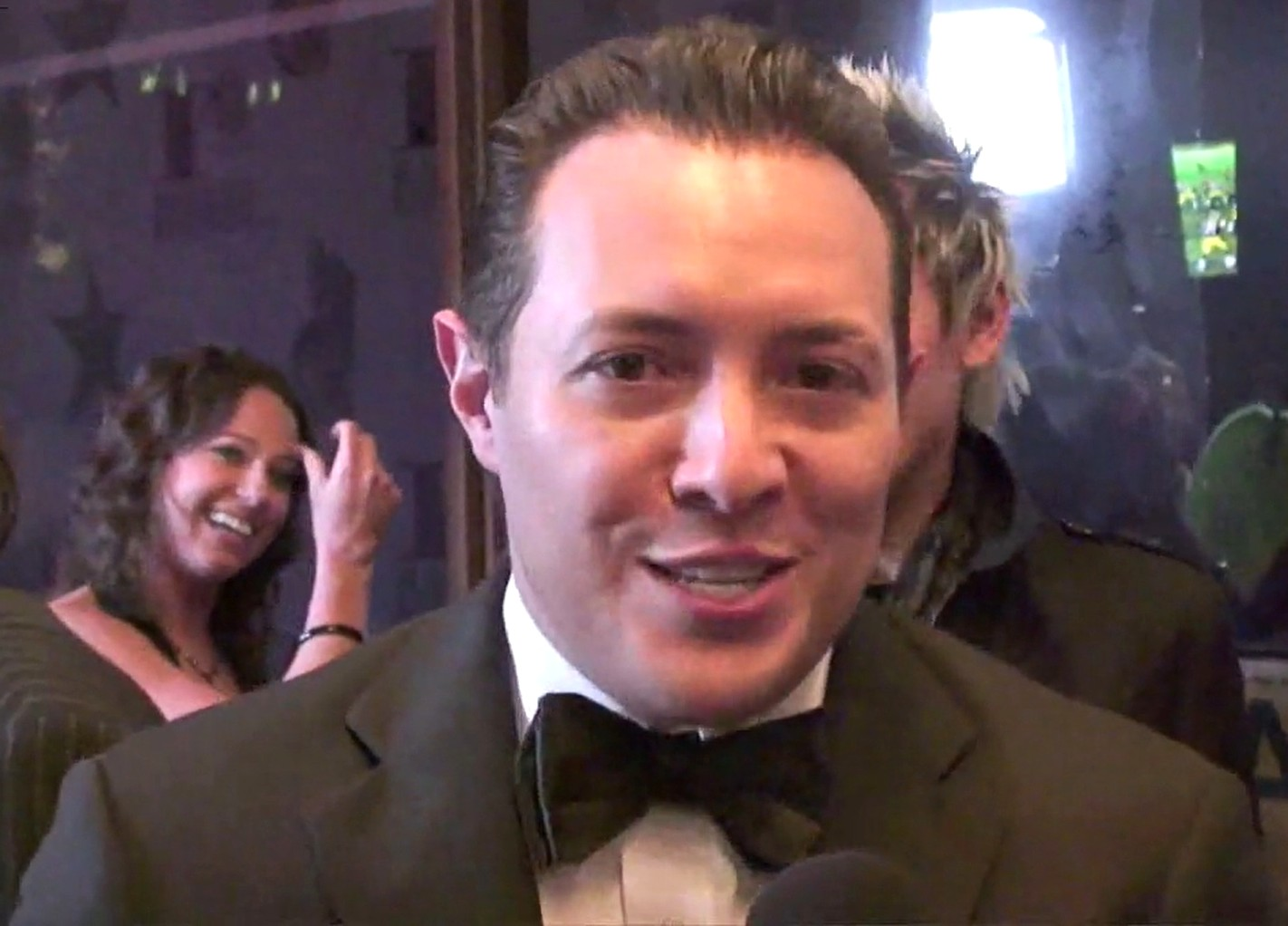
- Bustamante in 2008
- Born: Héctor Luis Bustamante Durango; Medellín, Colombia
- Citizenship: United States
- Education: Parsons School of Design
- Occupation: Actor
- Years active: 2003–present
- Children: 1
- Website: Official website

Héctor Luis Bustamante is a Colombian-American actor. He is best known for his emotionally-charged performance as Pedro Vera in the 2008 original LMN movie Little Girl Lost: The Delimar Vera Story. He currently stars in the American short virtual reality project Carne y Arena (Flesh and Sand) written and directed by Alejandro González Iñárritu. Carne y Arena was awarded the first Special Achievement Academy Award in over 20 years by the Academy of Motion Picture Arts and Sciences.

== Early life ==
He was born Héctor Luis Bustamante Durango in Medellín, Colombia to Dagoberto Bustamante and Aracelly Durango. Bustamante and his family moved to the United States when he was 12. Bustamante is an alumnus of the 1989 Governor's School of New Jersey as an art scholar. His first theatrical role was in a Hackensack High School production of West Side Story, which was well received and led him to roles in several other productions, though his drama teacher told him that he would never be a professional actor because his accent was too thick for American TV.

Bustamante focused on art and started working as a graphic designer. By age 19, he was the art director for New Jersey Golf magazine.

== Career ==
In 1995, Bustamante enrolled in the Parsons School of Design in New York City, paying for school by working in retail as a security guard and eventually became the security manager in one of a retail store on Fifth Avenue.

In the fall of 1999, he used his work in the security field to transfer to San Francisco. While in the Bay Area, Bustamante attended the Shelton Studios, also known as the Jean Shelton Actors Lab, where he studied under acting coach and mentor Jean Shelton.

In March 2000, Bustamante met acting coach Nancy Berwid, who invited him to an acting workshop. A year later, at a workshop Berwid hosted Hector met Donna Eckholdt, VP of talent development and casting for Paramount's Big Ticket Television. After seeing Bustamante's work, Eckholdt considered him for a series regular role on a project based on the life of a New York City private investigator.

A year later while still in San Francisco, Bustamante made his first major TV appearance on CBS' The Agency, playing the head of the Colombian police. Within weeks he landed his second role in NYPD Blue opposite Dennis Franz and Mark-Paul Gosselaar. In the spring of 2003 Bustamante resigned from his security job and moved to Los Angeles. Since then he has performed in guest star roles on such shows as 24, Crossing Jordan, Without a Trace, Monk, and films such as, Hostage opposite Bruce Willis and Sueño opposite John Leguizamo.

== Filmography ==
- Hostage as Officer Ruiz (2005)
- Sueño as Trendy Latino (2005)
- Right at Your Door as Store Owner (2006)
- Little Girl Lost: The Delimar Vera Story as Pedro Vega (2008)
- Rise of the Zombies as Ramon (2012)
- Paranormal Activity: The Marked Ones as Bodega manager (2014)
- Flesh and Sand (2017)
- I'll Be Next Door for Christmas as Lance (2018)

== Television roles ==
- Lodge 49 - Carlos Aguilar (2018)
- LaGolda - Juanito (voice, 2017)
- Stalker - Juan (2015)
- See Dad Run - Policeman (2014)
- Passions - Henchman (2008)
- The Shield - Luis Aramboles (2007-2008)
- Heroes - Garcia (2007)
- Big Shots - Hector (2007)
- 24 - Dr. Martinez (2005)
- The King of Queens - Hector (2005)
- Crossing Jordan - Eddie/Pete Delgado (2004-2007)
- Without a Trace - Hector Delgado (2003)
- Monk - Customs Agent Gomez (2003)
- NYPD Blue - Neffy Conception (2003)
- The Agency - Colombian Policeman (2002)

== Video games ==
Year	Videogames	Role
2010	Red Dead Redemption	Captain Vincente De Santa
2010	Red Dead Redemption: Undead Nightmare	Captain Vincente De Santa

== Awards and nominations ==
Bustamante won the 2009 Imagen Award for outstanding lead Actor in a made-for-television movie.
