= Heinrich Himmer =

Austrian politician (born 1978)

Member of the National Council
- Incumbent
- Assumed office 24 October 2024
- Constituency: Vienna

Personal details
- Born: 24 December 1978 (age 47)
- Party: Social Democratic Party

Heinrich Himmer (born 24 December 1978) is an Austrian politician of the Social Democratic Party serving as a member of the National Council since 2024. From 2021 to 2023, he served as deputy president of the BSA.
