= Valentina Dmitryeva =

Russian and Soviet writer (1859–1947)

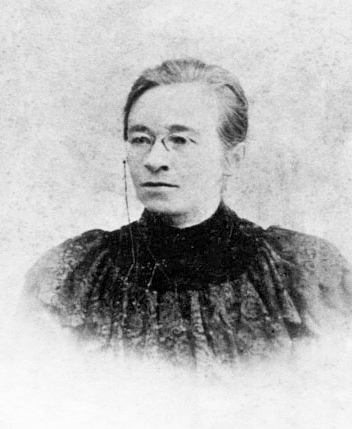
- Born: May 10, 1859; Saratov Gubernia, Russia
- Died: February 18, 1947 (aged 87); Sochi, Soviet Union
- Occupations: Writer; doctor; teacher
- Writing career
- Genres: Fiction, memoirs
- Notable works: Hveska, The Doctor's Watchman

Valentina Iovovna Dmitryeva (Russian: Валенти́на Ио́вовна Дми́триева; May 10, 1859 – February 18, 1947) was a Russian writer, teacher, medical doctor and revolutionary.

== Early life ==
Dmitryeva was born in the village of Voronino, in the Saratov Governorate of the Russian Empire, where her father was a serf. He had been sent to an agricultural school by his master and was subsequently made the overseer of his master's estate. Her mother, Anna passed on her love of literature to Dmitryeva. After the Emancipation reform of 1861 the family was reduced to poverty and a transient existence.

As a girl, Dmitryeva read everything she could find, from borrowed books to discarded newspapers. She kept a diary, using scraps of paper and old envelopes. She maintained the diary from the age of 10 to 23, when it was confiscated in a police search. The family eventually went to live in the household of Dmitryeva's maternal grandfather. As a teenage girl in her grandfather's home, she was confined to the traditional role of girls in Russian society of the time, limiting her to household tasks such as sewing and cooking, while her brother was sent to study with the son of a rich landowner. She was able to study secretly using books given to her by her brother's tutor.

In 1873 she was admitted to the Tambov Girl's Secondary School. She worked her way through school by doing tutoring jobs, and with the help of one of her teachers. She graduated in 1877. By the time of her graduation she had become radicalized, and was writing reviews of works by leading critical thinkers like Nikolay Mikhaylovsky, Gleb Uspensky and Nikolay Dobrolyubov for her reading and discussion group in Tambov.

== Career ==
After graduating she took a job as a teacher in a village school, one of the few positions open to women, and published articles in the press about the poor state of public education. She was dismissed from her post after writing a critical letter to the authorities, and prohibited from teaching. Unable to teach, she decided to pursue a medical career.

She entered the Women's Medical Courses in Saint Petersburg in 1878. This program owed its existence to the influence of the Minister of War Dmitry Milyutin, who was an advocate of medical education for women. Dmitryeva spent almost as much time aiding revolutionary activists as she did on her studies, allowing her room to be used for storing illegal literature and as a safe house for wanted revolutionaries. Her connections, which included members of Narodnaya Volya, led to her arrest in 1880, and a short term of imprisonment in the Peter and Paul Fortress. After the arrest and disappearance of most of her friends in the early 1880s, and finding herself in difficult financial circumstances, she turned increasingly to writing. She graduated from the Medical Courses in 1886, and studied obstetrics and gynaecology in Moscow until 1887.

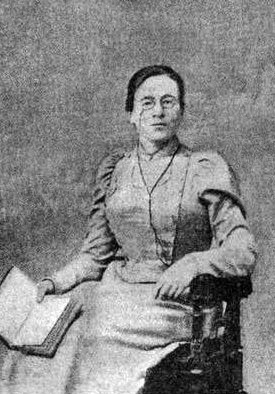
Dmitryeva in the 1890s.

In 1887 she was arrested and imprisoned for participating in student demonstrations, and was later exiled to Tver for four years with her sister, where she was under police surveillance. In 1892 she moved to Voronezh with her husband, who had also served time in confinement for revolutionary activities.

She found work as a doctor during outbreaks of cholera (1892–1893), and diphtheria, typhus and scarlet fever in 1894. During her time treating these epidemics, she stood up to local authorities, demanding a decent salary, badly needed equipment and sober staff, which had been denied to her and other women doctors.

Dmitryeva became a full-time writer in 1895. She and her husband lived in Voronezh until 1917, while making occasional trips to Moscow, Saint Petersburg and Europe. During the Russian Civil War she fled to Sochi after losing her mother and 3 brothers to cold and starvation. She nearly died of starvation herself, and lost her husband who died after being imprisoned by the Bolsheviks. During the Soviet period she devoted her time to the cause of literacy, and to writing memoirs and children's stories. She died in Sochi in 1947.

== Literary work ==
Dmitryeva made her literary debut in 1877 as a writer of peasant stories at a time when educated Russians were eager to learn about peasants and rural life. Her first story To Seek Justice appeared in a newspaper in Saratov. Her story Akhmetka's Wife (1881) attracted favorable attention from critics and praise from Nadezhda Khvoshchinskaya, an established woman writer. Dmitryeva's works treated a wide variety of settings and characters. Besides rural Russia, her stories cover Ukraine, the Crimea and the Caucasus.

In the course of her literary career she met Maxim Gorky, Leonid Andreyev, Vikenty Veresayev, and other well-known writers. Her works were published in the journals Russian Thought, The Herald of Europe and Russian Wealth. Her most popular work was the children's story A Boy and His Dog (1899) which went through more than twenty editions.

== Literary impact ==
The 1870s and 1880s marked a rise in women’s literary participation in Russia, driven by expanded access to education, urbanization, and shifting social roles. As professional opportunities for women remained limited, many turned to literature and journalism, a space where they could express themselves intellectually and politically. Valentina Dmitryeva, like many of her contemporaries from modest or urban backgrounds, entered the literary world during this period of growing visibility for women writers. New women’s journals and mass publishing helped amplify their voices and reach wider audiences.

Valentina Dmitryeva was one of the most prominent and widely read realist writers of her era. Her work bridges the tradition of 19th-century literary Realism with the evolving concerns of late Imperial Russia, addressing topics such as rural poverty, urban labour conditions, the lives of the intelligentsia, and the oppression of women. Dmitryeva’s narratives frequently centered the experiences of women not only as victims of patriarchal systems, but as resilient, independent figures capable of resisting social constraints with both courage and wit. Her literary style was marked by an unsentimental, grounded portrayal of peasant life, shaped by her firsthand experiences as a teacher, rural doctor, and social activist. Her stories—such as Khves’ka the Orderly (1900), Clouds (1904), and The Bees Are Buzzing (1906)—stand out for their detailed and empathetic depictions of everyday rural hardship for the common folk and working class, especially that of women and children. Dmitryeva often employed non-standard, colloquial language to authentically reflect the voices of her subjects. In works like Dimka (1900), which follows a young boy toiling in a glass factory, she reveals the brutal realities of child labor with sensitivity and depth.

Her memoir Round the Villages (1896), based on her time as a physician during a diphtheria outbreak, offers a vivid portrayal of both the suffering of rural communities and the internal conflicts of an educated woman navigating peasant society. This theme is evident in Dmitryeva’s other works as well, such as her 1930 autobiography Tak Bylo: Put Moei Shizni (The Way It Was: The Path of My Life), where she describes the similar challenges she faced as a rural physician. In one village detailed in her autobiography, she writes about how she was confronted with widespread malnutrition and illness—residents suffered from visible symptoms of chronic hunger, including open sores, skin diseases, bleeding gums, muscle weakness, and advanced bone deterioration. Dmitryeva documented as she moved through the village, she was followed by a crowd of people who looked to her with a fragile sense of hope. In that moment, she recognized the harsh reality of her situation: the medical tools and treatments available to her were deeply insufficient. Despite her training and efforts, she felt powerless in the face of overwhelming poverty, with the social conditions around her rendering her work almost futile. Overall, Dmitryeva’s body of work makes a significant contribution to the tradition of village prose, distinguished by its realist clarity, sharp social critique, and literary innovation. Her writing sheds important light on the often-overlooked experiences of Russian rural communities during her time.

== English translations ==
- Love's Anvil: A Romance of Northern Russia (novel, tr. of Gomochka [1894]), Stanley Paul, London, 1921
- Hveska, The Doctor's Watchman, (short story), from In the Depths: Russian Stories, Raduga Publishers, 1987.
- After the Great Hunger, (excerpt), from Anthology of Russian Women's Writing, 1777–1992, Catriona Kelly, Oxford University Press, 1994.
