= Jeremy Bryan Jones =

American murderer and self-confessed serial killer

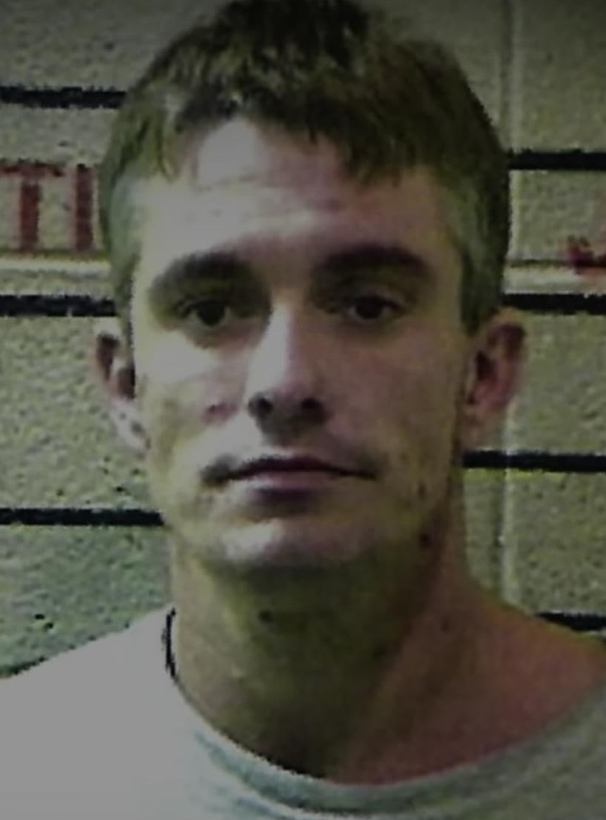
- Jeremy Bryan Jones
- Born: April 12, 1973 (age 53); Miami, Oklahoma, U.S.
- Other name: John Paul Chapman
- Convictions: Capital murder Various convictions for rape and drug possession
- Penalty: Death

Details
- Victims: 1–21
- Span of crimes: 1992 – 2004 (alleged)
- Country: United States
- States: Alabama (convicted); Kansas, Georgia, Louisiana, Oklahoma (confessed)
- Date apprehended: For the final time on September 21, 2004
- Imprisoned at: Holman Correctional Facility, Atmore, Alabama

Jeremy Bryan Jones (born April 12, 1973) is an American murderer and self-confessed serial killer. Convicted and sentenced to death for murdering a woman in Mobile, Alabama, in 2004, Jones later confessed to murdering 20 additional people in four other states before recanting. He has never been charged in any other murders, and the credibility of some of his confessions is considered dubious.

== Biography ==
Jeremy Bryan Jones was born on April 12, 1973, in Miami, Oklahoma, the elder of two boys. In the late 1970s, Jones' parents divorced and his mother remarried, but the family was nevertheless considered a stable one. Due to this stepfather's work as a carpenter, the Joneses were considered relatively well-off.

In contrast to this, however, Jeremy himself showed signs of anti-social and aggressive behavior from an early age, due to which neighbors avoided interacting with him. He also did not care about his academic achievements, and was frequently disciplined for his truancy and low grades. In the late 1980s, he developed an addiction to alcohol and began using drugs, and by the end of 1989, he was expelled from the Miami High School. He then briefly attended the Quapaw High School in nearby Quapaw, but as he preferred to spend his time on the streets, Jones was eventually expelled in 1991, shortly before the end of the 12th grade. His actions got him into conflict with family members.

In January 1990, Jones was arrested for assaulting a boy - during the incident, his own mother attempted to protect the victim, but was herself beaten as well. He was then charged with two counts of assault, but they were eventually dropped after the victims reconciled. Utilizing his charisma, Jones was considered popular among the young women in his hometown, with whom he would often have sex.

=== Move to Kansas and murder of Jennifer Judd ===
In early 1992, Jones left Miami with one of his girlfriends and moved to Baxter Springs, Kansas, where he lived with a highschool friend named Justin Judd. As he had no formal education, he resorted to working in low-skilled labor, causing him and his girlfriend to experience financial hardship. The pair frequently argued, during which Jones physically assaulted his girlfriend - Judd frequently called the police, but no case was initiated because the girlfriend refused to file charges.

On May 9, Justin Judd married his girlfriend Jennifer, whom he had known since high school. Two days after their wedding, an intruder broke into their home while Justin was away, bound Jennifer and proceeded to stab her multiple times. During the investigation, Jones was named as a suspect based on the testimony of Justin, who claimed that he was interested in her. Jones insisted that he was innocent, and since there was no credible evidence to charge him, he was released.

=== Rapes ===
After the murder of Jennifer Judd, Jones broke up with his girlfriend, left Baxter Springs, and began to live a criminal lifestyle. During this period, he changed several places of residence, earned a living as a day laborer and occasional committed petty thefts. On November 5, 1995, Jones was arrested for rape, but was released after posting bail and fled. Between November 1995 and January 1996, he committed two additional crimes. On January 10, 1996, he was arrested in Oklahoma on charges of rape and unlawful possession of methamphetamine. During the investigation, police were contacted by a woman who claimed that Jones had assaulted her at gunpoint. He was subsequently convicted of the drug possession charge and sentenced to two years imprisonment, which he served at the Dick Conner Correctional Center in Hominy.

He was granted parole and released in early 1997, but was soon taken into custody over the rapes. During his trial, Jones, on the advice of his attorney, agreed to plead guilty on three counts of assault and sexual harassment, but his victims refused to appear in court, due to which their testimony was considered questionable. On March 3, 1997, Jones was placed on probation for five years and released from the courthouse - however, as he was diagnosed with a mental impairment, he was placed on a psychiatric registry, ordered to see a psychiatrist regularly and to give DNA samples. Jones refused to comply with the court orders, and continued to commit crimes.

== Fugitive ==
In 2000, he became a suspect in two additional rapes, due to which his probation was revoked and a warrant was issued for his arrest. Upon learning of this, Jones left Oklahoma and moved to Joplin, Missouri, where he met a woman in a bar whose son, John Paul Chapman, was serving a sentence at a state prison. With his charisma, Jones won her affection and sympathy and moved in with her. Sometime afterwards, he persuaded the woman to sell him her son's papers and social security card for $50, after which he stole the man's identity and left the state in December 2000.

Under the name of Chapman, Jones moved to Tuscaloosa, Alabama, where he lived for two years before financial difficulties caused him to move to Georgia. On May 1, 2003, he was at the "Gipson's Restaurant and Lounge" bar in Douglasville when he met Vicki Freeman, who was 13 years older than him. The two soon became roommates, frequently changing places of residence and jobs over the following two years.

In October 2003, Jones was arrested for disorderly conduct and taken to a police station, where his fingerprints were run through IAFIS. However, due to a glitch in the system, his true identity was not revealed, and when his fingerprints were entered a second time, he was falsely identified as John Paul Chapman. After paying the administrative fine, Jones was released and left Georgia to seek work, spending several weeks in New Orleans, Louisiana. In late January 2004, he returned to Georgia, where he was soon arrested in Atlanta for trespassing. He pleaded guilty, was sentenced to three months imprisonment in the county jail, and released in March 2004.

Soon after his release, Jones reunited with Freeman and found work as a day laborer, but was re-arrested for drug possession in June of that year. He again pleaded guilty, and due to the court's leniency, he was given another three months at the county jail. Upon his release in early September, he left Georgia and headed for Alabama, where there was a desperate need to repair buildings in cities across the state, which had recently been hit by Hurricane Ivan.

== Murder of Lisa Nichols ==
=== Background ===
On September 15, 2004, Jones arrived in Turnerville, a small community near Satsuma, where he had been hired to do some construction and renovation work for Mark and Kim Bentley. Still impersonating Chapman, he informed Mark that he was looking for work and housing, whereupon Bentley offered that he could stay in their trailer with his cousin Scooter Coleman - shortly afterwards, the Bentleys and their children left to visit some friends in Chickasaw. Early the next day, Jones phoned Kim Bentley and said that he needed some batteries and a radio, with Bentley informing him that he could find them in the bedroom closet - however, she demanded that he work with Coleman to find said items, as she did not trust him. According to Coleman's later testimony, Jones found a .25 caliber handgun while searching the closet shelves, which he appropriated for himself under the guise of protecting himself from looters who were stealing from vacant houses during the hurricane.

Later that evening, the Bentleys returned home. On the day afterwards, everyone started doing repairs in the backyard when they were suddenly visited by 43-year-old Lisa Marie Nichols, a neighbor who had recently returned to Turnerville after waiting for Hurricane Ivan to pass. Jones overheard from a conversation she had with one of the Bentleys that she was single and living alone. That same evening, he went to the home of another neighbor, Chris Hill, whereupon the two men drank alcohol and consumed drugs for several hours. On September 17, everyone was doing repairs in the backyard again, and by the evening, Kim Bentley left her husband and Jones a package containing several cans of Bud Light beer and left the home with her children. At the same time, Coleman also left to visit a friend named Joel Tough Edge. A couple of hours later, Mark Bentley finished the repairs, after which the former left to go to a fast food restaurant. The nearest open restaurant at the time was a Hardee's in Citronelle, about a 30-minute drive from the Bentley home, and accounting for the queue, it took Bentley two hours to get there.

=== The murder ===
After all other occupants had left, Jones took the handgun and a package of Bud Light beers and went to Nichols' house. He broke in and raped her at gunpoint, ultimately shooting her three times with the handgun. In an attempt to destroy evidence, he returned to the Bentleys' house and took a gas canister which he brought back with him. Jones then placed her corpse in the bathtub before dousing it with flammable liquid and setting it on fire. He then returned to the Bentley house, changed clothes, took a shower and waited for the others to return.

Later that evening, Mark Bentley heard noises through his open window and smelled gasoline. While looking around the yard, he found Jones with four cans of gasoline - upon noticing this, Jones asked if he could use them to fuel his car for an overnight drive around town. Bentley refused, as he had grown suspicious of him, after which both men went to bed. On the following day, Nichols' daughters Jennifer Murphy and Amber Nichols, as well as her son-in-law, Todd McKerchie, arrived in Turnerville, informing Kim that Lisa had failed to show up for work and was not answering their phone calls. As there was still no electricity in the house, McKerchie started searching around with a flashlight when he discovered Nichols' charred remains. McKerchie and Nichols' daughters then went to the Bentleys and told them to call the police while McKerchie, Mark Bentley and neighbor Scott Colemeno continued to inspect the house to understand what had happened. During this time, they noticed that Jones was acting weirdly, expressing no emotion upon hearing of the body being discovered and refusing to cooperate with the Mobile County Sheriff's Department during interviews.

=== Flight, identification, and arrest ===
On the morning of September 19, Jones fled Turnerville. While officers were investigating the house, they found three .25 caliber bullets lodged into a wall - when questioned, Bentley admitted to having a gun and gave it to the police. Investigators determined from the smell of gunpowder, soot residue and bullet casings that the gun had been fired recently, and when sent for an examination, it was revealed to be the murder weapon. The Bentleys and Coleman were brought in for questioning, with Coleman claiming that the gun may have been stolen from the man he knew as "Chapman". A search of the rooms led to the discovery of an empty Bud Light beer can with fingerprints on it that investigators believed was used by the killer. After Kim Bentley told police that "Chapman" and her husband had drunk Bud Light on the day of the murder, "Chapman" was included as a suspect and sought for questioning.

He was arrested in the early morning hours of September 21, 2004, in Mobile. While searching for him, the Mobile County Sheriff's Department relayed their known information to neighboring states, after which the Missouri Attorney General's Office notified them that their suspect had the same birth date and social security number as someone serving time at a prison in their jurisdiction. Sheriffs went to interview the real John Paul Chapman and, afterwards, his mother revealed that she had sold her son's identity to a man named Jeremy Bryan Jones. After learning of this, they obtained fingerprint samples from the Miami Police Department dating from Jones' 1990 arrest, conclusively establishing that that was his true identity.

Jones initially insisted that he was innocent, but after forensic tests confirmed that Lisa Nichols was killed with the Bentley's handgun and that the fingerprints on the beer can were his, he amended his claims and admitted responsibility. He then claimed that he did while under the influence of methamphetamines, but went on to change his testimony several more times.

== Later confessions ==
In his initial statements, Jones claimed that on the day of the murder he was at Nichols' home and that they had shared methamphetamines before having sex. According to him, at some point Nichols complained of chest pains, then began suffering from cramps and died in the bathroom shortly afterwards. Jones insisted that he was stressed out from her death, causing him to shoot her three times in the head and set her body on fire.

On November 4, Jones changed his story again, this time claiming that he had broken into her house and attempted to sexually assaulted her at gunpoint, but was unable to sustain an erection - because of this, he instead threw a towel over Nichols' head and shot her. In early January 2005, he changed his story yet again, this time claiming that he had killed her accidentally. In this version, he claimed that Nichols had tried to flee and fought with him, causing him to threaten to shoot her in an attempt to calm her down - however, he accidentally discharged the gun and did kill her, causing him to panic and set her body on fire.

At around this time, Jones made several phone calls while at the county jail, calling his mother, friends, acquaintances and his roommate, Vicki Freeman. After locating all these individuals, investigators questioned them all in order to obtain information about Jones. In an interview with police, Freeman unexpectedly stated her belief that Jones was responsible for the murder of 16-year-old Amanda Greenwell, a next-door neighbor of theirs while they were living in Douglasville, Georgia.

=== Serial killer accusations ===
Amanda Ann Greenwell went missing on March 12, 2004, and her body was found on March 21 - she had been strangled and stabbed several times with a knife. Her father, Rick, could not recall Jones, but did recall Freeman, stating that he had talked with her on several occasions. Jones did not admit his involvement in Greenwell's murder, but unexpectedly confessed to committing 20 additional murders across five states over a 12-year period. In eight of these cases, he was unable to recall the names of his victims or where exactly he had dumped their bodies, claiming that five of them were prostitutes from Atlanta and the remaining were also prostitutes from Mobile, Alabama, whose bodies he would dump in swamps. In regard to the remaining murders, he recounted details known only to investigators - one of these confessed murders was that of Jennifer Judd, his high school friend's wife, whose murder he had been suspected of committing back in early 1992.

According to Jones' testimony, on February 21, 1996, in Delaware County, Oklahoma, he broke into the trailer of 38-year-old Daniel "Danny" Oakley, where he assaulted him and his roommate, 41-year-old Doris Harris. In the attack, Jones robbed and then shot them to death, then set their trailer on fire. In the follow-up investigation, local resident Denny Ray Hunnicutt was arrested in Miami, as he was found to be driving Oakley's vehicle. When examining the car, investigators found fingerprints that belonged to the murdered couple, Hunnicutt and some other unknown individual. Hunnicutt insisted that he was innocent and provided an alibi - it was eventually confirmed and he was ruled out as a suspect, but he was imprisoned on a drug charge. After Jones' confession, the Miami Police Department reopened the investigation and in an effort to prove his culpability in the murders, examined the fingerprints found in Oakley's car - however, they were not a match to Jones'. Hunnicutt was interviewed again, but refused to cooperate with authorities and died in 2006.

In early September 1999, according to Jones' claims, he met 19-year-old Justin D. Hutchings in Picher, supposedly to buy drugs from him. On September 11, after the pair drank a huge quantity of alcohol at a local bar, he claimed that he intentionally injected Hutchings with excessive amounts of methamphetamine mixed with an unspecified chemical. Hutchings died shortly afterwards from an overdose.

=== Freeman murders ===
On December 29, 1999, Jones, according to investigators, committed a quadruple murder in Welch. He admitted to entering the home of 40-year-old Danny Freeman, who lived with his wife Kathy and their daughter, 16-year-old Ashley Freeman, and were currently being visited by her friend, 16-year-old Lauria Bible to celebrate Ashley's birthday party. Jones claimed that after he entered the house, he shot the spouses in the head at close range, set fire to the house and then forced the teenagers into his car at gunpoint. He then supposedly drove them to a forested area near the border with Kansas, where he raped and shot them, then dumped their bodies in an abandoned mine. When asked for a motive, he claimed that he was an acquaintance of Danny Freeman and wanted to kill him because the former had not paid him on time for a methamphetamine deal.

Jones described in detail the layout of the Freemans' house, including the exact location of the mailbox. During his interrogation, he indicated on a map the location of the mine where he had dumped Ashley Freeman and Bible's remains, but their bodies were never found and this cast doubt on his testimony. Investigators did not rule out the possibility that he may have learned details about the case by watching television, as a story about the murders and the missing girls was shown on an episode of America's Most Wanted. A number of relatives of the victims also questioned the veracity of his admissions.

=== Other murders ===
Jones also confessed to the murder of Tina Mayberry, 38, who was attacked after leaving a Halloween party on October 31, 2002, at a bar in Douglasville, Georgia. He claimed to have met a woman at a bar who was dressed as Betty Boop. After he managed to convince her to leave the bar, he assaulted her, then stabbed her several times in the chest and stomach. Left with bleeding wounds, Mayberry went back to the bar, where customers called the police. She was taken to the hospital, where she died from blood loss. Police were unable to locate any witnesses or identify the killer, as Mayberry was unable to provide a description of her assailant before succumbing to her injuries. After Jones' arrest, the bar owner and staff identified him as a regular customer at the establishment at the time of Mayberry's murder.

Jones also claimed that in early January 2004, he met 46-year-old prostitute Katherine Collins in New Orleans, Louisiana, after which he raped, stabbed and bludgeoned her with a tire iron. Collins was reported missing on January 10, but her body was found on February 14 on a lawn about a block away from the Port of New Orleans. She remained unidentified until after Jones' arrest. Biological traces belonging to the supposed perpetrator were found on her body, and DNA samples from Jones were taken to check his involvement in the crime.

Jones' penultimate victim, according to him, was 38-year-old Patrice Endres, who was murdered on April 15, 2004, in Cumming, Georgia. The woman was the owner of a small beauty salon called "Tamber's Trim 'N Tran", and disappeared on the morning of April 15. One of her clients showed up at the salon around 12:00 PM and found the salon empty. After Endres failed to show up and did not return any of her phone calls, the customer called the police. In the subsequent search, police officers found her purse, personal items, food in the microwave and her car, which was in the parking lot next to the salon without any sign of forced entry.

When questioned, Jones stated that he entered Endres' salon to ask for directions. While talking to her, he learned that she was all alone, after which he threatened her with a knife and forced her to give him money from the cash register, leave the building and get into the car. In support of his words, Jones drew on paper a plan of the location of the door and windows in the salon building, as well as the location on the street where the parking lot and car were located. Jones claimed that he drove the woman to a wooded area about 65 miles from the abduction site, where he raped her and then stabbed her to death. He insisted that he had dumped Endres' body in a creek and drew a map for investigators, but as the body was not found, his confession' credibility was questioned.

In the end, despite his many confessions, Jones was charged with only three murders. In late 2004, he was charged with the murders of Nichols and Greenwell, and in late January 2005, with the murder of Collins. High-ranking police officers from the three states organized a meeting and formed a plan to prosecute Jones, where it was decided that he would be extradited to Alabama first, then to Louisiana and Georgia for the respective cases.

== Trial ==
Jones' trial was scheduled to begin on August 15, 2005, but it was postponed due to a motion by his attorneys that requested that he undergo a mental evaluation first. The examination concluded that although he had mental impairments, he was nonetheless sane and able to stand trial. Shortly before the trial began, representatives from the FBI issued a formal apology to the relatives of Nichols and other potential victims for the glitch that allowed for his release.

The trial officially began on October 19, and lasted one week. The main evidence for the prosecution was Jones' confession, the fingerprints found on the beer can, the testimony of Scooter Coleman, the handgun and the DNA results that determined bloodstains found on Jones' clothes belonged to Lisa Nichols. At said trial, Jones recanted all of his confessions, but was nonetheless found guilty by jury verdict for murdering Nichols. The Mobile County Prosecutor's Office sought the death penalty, while his attorneys sought a life term without parole because he was intoxicated and mentally impaired at the time of the murder. The court found that the mitigating factors were insufficient, and on December 1, 2005, Jones was sentenced to death. After the convictions, charges were dropped in the Greenwell and Collins cases due to lack of evidence to secure a conviction.

=== Imprisonment and credibility of confessions ===
After his conviction, Jones was transferred to the Holman Correctional Facility in Atmore, where he remains on the state's death row. In the late 2000s, his attorneys filed an appeal to overturn his death sentence, with the motion succeeding in doing so in 2010. He was later re-sentenced to death, and as of May 2023, he remains incarcerated on death row.

Jones' culpability in other murders since his conviction has been questioned and challenged by many. Jones himself has insisted that he was solely responsible for Nichols' murder and that he made the false confessions so that he would be provided with better conditions at the county jail. His attorney Habib Yazidi supported these claims, arguing that his client had taken advantage of the media attention and perjured himself in order to obtain privileges, such as more and longer phone calls, as well as better food. He was described as skillful manipulator with a high enough IQ that, under different circumstances, would have benefitted him greatly in various walks of life.

Vicki Freeman gave Jones an alibi for at least two of the murders. She claimed that he was with her in Douglasville the night Katherine Collins was murdered in New Orleans, and that he was working near Douglasville when Patrice Endres vanished. The latter's body was found in December 2005 behind a Baptist church about 10 miles from where she was abducted, casting further doubt on Jones' confession. His guilt in the Collins case was also considered questionable, as he was unable to provide any specific details and the geographic data did not correlate. The results of the DNA test also showed discrepancies between Jones' genotype and that of the killer.

Jones also completely recanted his statements in regards to the Freeman murders, with doubts remaining about his involvement for over 15 years. This was further exacerbated when Tommy Lynn Sells, another murderer who claimed to be a serial killer, also confessed to some of the crimes Jones supposedly committed. Jones was officially ruled out as a suspect in 2018, when 66-year-old Ronnie Dean Busick was arrested. He, along with Warren Welch and David Pennington, who were deceased, were determined to be the true perpetrators.

== In the media and culture ==
Jones was the subject of an episode of the series Unsolved Mysteries, produced by Netflix in 2020. The series discussed the question of Jones' guilt in most of the murders he had confessed to.

== See also ==
- Tommy Lynn Sells
- Capital punishment in Alabama
- List of death row inmates in the United States § Alabama
