= Sergey Viktorovich Dmitriev =

Russian historian and sinologist (born 1979)

- Сергей Викторович Дмитриев
- Born: 24 July 1979 (age 47); Moscow, Russian SFSR, Soviet Union
- Title: Leading research fellow and associate professor

Academic background
- Education: Moscow State University; French University College in Moscow; Paris 1 Panthéon-Sorbonne University; École pratique des hautes études
- Thesis: The Ancient Chinese City in the Han Period (206 BC–AD 220) (2006)

Academic work
- Discipline: History; sinology
- Institutions: Institute of Oriental Studies of the Russian Academy of Sciences; Russian State University for the Humanities
- Main interests: History and literature of Han China; the Mongol Empire; Central Asia; medieval Uyghurs; Tangut history and culture

Sergey Viktorovich Dmitriev (Russian: Сергей Викторович Дмитриев; born 24 July 1979) is a Russian historian and sinologist. He received the degree of Candidate of Historical Sciences in 2006 and is a leading research fellow at the Institute of Oriental Studies of the Russian Academy of Sciences and an associate professor at the Russian State University for the Humanities. He specializes in the history of China.

== Early life and education ==
Dmitriev was born on 24 July 1979 in Moscow. He graduated from Gymnasium No. 1543 in Moscow in 1996.

From 1996 to 2002, he studied at the MSU Faculty of History, specializing in the history and culture of ancient China, and graduated with honours.

In 1999–2000, he undertook language training at the Renmin University of China in Beijing.

From 2001 to 2003, he studied history at the French University College in Moscow at Moscow State University. In 2003–2004, he studied in the DEA programme at Paris 1 Panthéon-Sorbonne University, where he defended a dissertation titled Christians of the Great Khans (Christianity in the Yuan Empire).

From 2002 to 2005, he completed full-time postgraduate study at the Institute of Oriental Studies of the Russian Academy of Sciences. In 2006, he defended a dissertation titled The Ancient Chinese City in the Han Period (206 BC–AD 220) and received the degree of Candidate of Historical Sciences.

In 2002–2003 and 2004–2005, he taught at the MSU Faculty of History, where he led a specialization in the history and culture of ancient China.

From 2005 to 2009, he undertook doctoral studies at the École pratique des hautes études in Paris.

== Academic career and research ==
Dmitriev has worked in the Department of China at the Institute of Oriental Studies since 2005. In 2015, he became head of its Sector of Ancient and Medieval History, and in 2022 he became a leading research fellow.

From 2009 to 2019, he taught at the Oriental University, now the Institute of Oriental Countries. From 2012 to 2021, he taught at the Institute of Asian and African Countries of Moscow State University, serving as an associate professor (senior research fellow) in the Department of Chinese History. Since 2014, he has taught at the Faculty of Philosophy of the Russian State University for the Humanities and has been an associate professor at its Research and Educational Centre for the Philosophy of the East.

His research interests include the history and literature of China during the Han dynasty, the history of the Mongol Empire and Central Asia, the history of the medieval Uyghurs, and Tangut history and culture.

His eLibrary.ru profile lists 183 publications in the Russian Science Citation Index, 452 citations and an h-index of 7.

Dmitriev has written a number of articles for the Great Russian Encyclopedia.

Since 2012, he has been deputy editor-in-chief of the book series Uchenye zapiski Otdela Kitaya (Scholarly Notes of the Department of China). From 2017 to 2020, he served on the editorial board of the journal Vostok.

He was a member of the programme committee of the 45th All-Russian Scholarly Conference with International Participation, Society and State in China, held in Moscow in 2015, and of the 46th Society and State in China conference, held in Moscow in 2016.

He has supervised three Candidate of Sciences dissertations and two master's theses.

== Public engagement ==
Dmitriev is a regular lecturer at the Arkhé Centre.

After Dmitriev posted the video lectures History of Ancient China on his personal channel, recordings of the first five talks were uploaded in 2021 to the channel of the Arkhé cultural and educational centre. The second part of the lectures was a university course that he delivered to students during distance learning. Novosibirsk State University combined the two parts and used them as an educational course.

S. A. Komissarov of Novosibirsk State University and the Institute of Archaeology and Ethnography SB RAS, and M. A. Kudinova of that institute and Peking University, wrote:

The course consists of a brilliant section devoted to the study of China by the Chinese themselves, a very thorough survey of Western sinology, and two lectures on pre-revolutionary Russian sinology ... The survey of Western schools and scholars (Dmitriev deliberately—and, in our view, entirely correctly—places individual scholars first) is close to ideal.

In 2024, new video lectures by Dmitriev on the history of China were made freely available as part of the NaukaPRO project. As a science communicator, he also participates in the educational projects Nefiktivnoye obrazovaniye, Dialogues on the East, and a lecture series organized by the Council of Young Scholars of the Institute of Oriental Studies.

In 2024, Dmitriev took part in the Moslektory project on the Moscow 24 television channel.

The educational publisher Peshkom v istoriyu has described Dmitriev as an “author of highly popular books and encyclopedias” about China, including We Live in Ancient China, A Guest from Ancient China and Chinese Tales: The Origins of the Main Festivals.

== Selected bibliography ==
=== Contribution to a collective monograph ===
- Piatigorsky, J.; Sapir, J. (2009). Le Grand Jeu: XIXe siècle, les enjeux géopolitiques de l’Asie Centrale. Paris: Autrement.

=== Articles ===
- “La vallée de Ganshigou : note sur une enquête archéologique et ethnographique”. Arts Asiatiques. Vol. 62 (2007), pp. 146–151. With Y. Kholotova-Shinek.
- “Поль Пеллио (1878—1945). От истории к легенде” [Paul Pelliot (1878–1945): From history to legend]. Vostok. 2009, no. 3, pp. 145–155.
- “Хархорумын асуудалд” [Some Issue on Karakorum] (in Russian). Nomadic Studies. 2009, no. 16, pp. 69–86.
- “Музей Гимэ” [The Guimet Museum]. Vostok. 2010, no. 2, pp. 177–180.
- “Пещерный комплекс Дуньхуан. История и изучение” [The Dunhuang cave complex: History and study]. Vostok. 2011, no. 4, pp. 108–115.
- “Каракорум, Отюкен и ранняя история уйгуров” [Karakorum, Ötüken and the early history of the Uyghurs]. Turkological Collection 2009–2010. Moscow: Vostochnaya literatura, 2011, pp. 152–179.
- “К проблеме изучения демографической ситуации в эпоху Хань” [On the problem of studying the demographic situation in the Han period]. In Asiatica: Works on the Philosophy and Cultures of the East, issue 5, edited by S. V. Pakhomov. Saint Petersburg: Saint Petersburg University Press, 2011, pp. 37–96.
- “Что такое Китай? Срединное государство в историческом мифе и реальной политике” [What is China? The Middle Kingdom in historical myth and real politics]. Vostok. 2012, no. 3, pp. 5–19. With Sergey Lvovich Kuzmin.
- “Империя Цин как Китай — анатомия исторического мифа” [The Qing Empire as China: The anatomy of a historical myth]. Vostok. 2014, no. 1, pp. 5–17. With Sergey Lvovich Kuzmin.

=== Children's books ===
- Мы живём в Древнем Китае: энциклопедия для детей [We Live in Ancient China: An Encyclopedia for Children]. Moscow: Peshkom v istoriyu, 2021. 76 pp. ISBN 978-5-6045922-3-6.
- Tao Tao Liu. Китайские мифы. От Царя обезьян и Нефритового императора до небесных драконов и духов стихий [Chinese Myths: From the Monkey King and the Jade Emperor to Heavenly Dragons and Spirits of the Elements]. Moscow: Mann, Ivanov and Ferber, 2023. 224 pp.
- Loputyn. Проклятые души. Легенды из Японии, Китая и Кореи [Cursed Souls: Legends from Japan, China and Korea]. Moscow: Mann, Ivanov and Ferber, 2024. 224 pp.

== Memberships ==
- Société Asiatique (2007).
- European Association for Chinese Studies (2016).
- Free Historical Society (2019).
