= Mikhail Gennadiyevich Dmitriyev =

Soviet and Russian mathematician

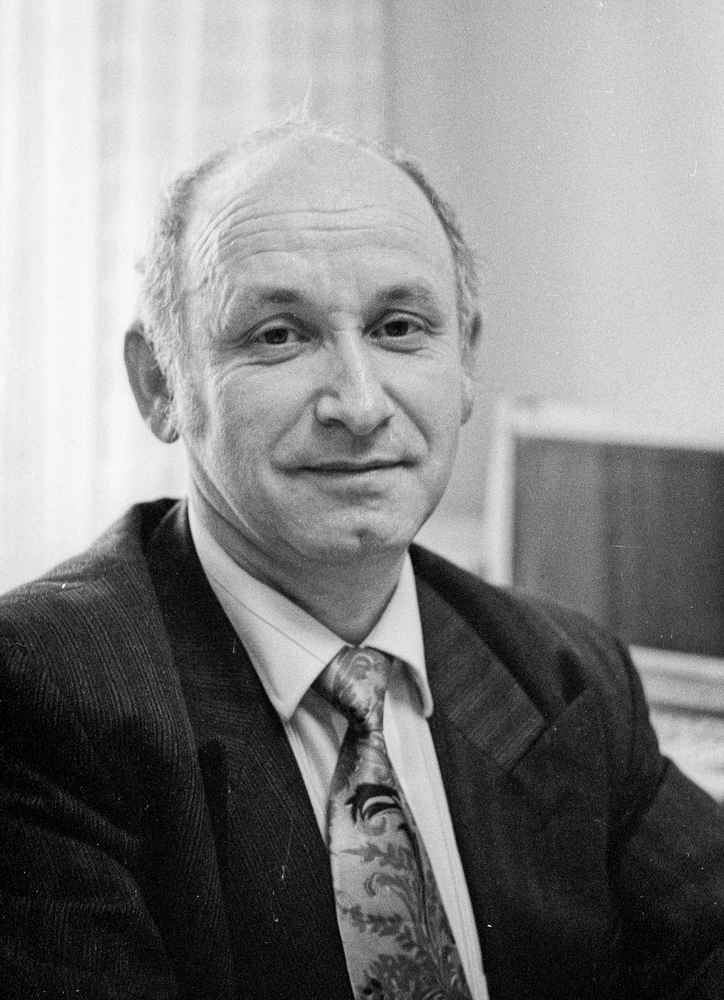
Mikhail Gennadieyevich Dmitriyev in 1996.

Mikhail Gennadiyevich Dmitriyev (Russian: Михаил Геннадьевич Дмитриев) is a Soviet and Russian mathematician. He was the President of the University of Pereslavl from 1995 to 1998. Currently he is a professor of the National Research University – Higher School of Economics

He holds a Doctor of Physical and Mathematical Sciences degree (1984), he is a specialist in applied mathematics and computer science. He has earned the "Honored Worker of Higher Professional Education of Russia" in 2008, and is a member of the Russian Academy of Natural Sciences.

== Notable work ==
He holds patent in Russia under number 2426226 (issued 11/01/2010) describing quantum frequency standards used to stabilize the frequency of masers.
