= James Mathews (rugby league) =

Australian rugby league footballer

Personal information
- Full name: James Burlton Mathews
- Born: 1 June 1968 Australia
- Died: 24 December 1992 (aged 24) Jugiong, New South Wales

Playing information
- Position: Centre
Club
Years	Team	Pld	T	G	FG	P
1988–91	Illawarra Steelers	22	2	17	0	42
1992	Eastern Suburbs	15	0	46	0	92
	Total	37	2	63	0	134
- Source: As of 13 February 2010

James Burlton Mathews (1 June 1968 – 24 December 1992) was an Australian rugby league footballer in the New South Wales Rugby League (NSWRL) competition.

Mathews attended the Yanco Agricultural College, before being signed by the Illawarra Steelers rugby league side in 1988 where he played until joining the Eastern Suburbs club in 1992. Mathews also headed the Roosters points scoring list that year. His career goal kicking average was 71.89%.

While driving to his parents' property near Wagga Wagga, Mathews lost control of his vehicle and collided head-on with another car. The emergency services responded immediately but were not able to save his life. The Sydney Roosters now name their Club Player of the year in his honour.
