= Hester Jonas =

German midwife and cunning woman (c. 1570 – 1635)

Hester Jonas aka The Witch of Neuss
- Born: Around 1570
- Died: 24 December 1635
- Occupation: Midwife
- Known for: Accused of witchcraft

Hester Jonas (around 1570 – December 24, 1635) was a German midwife and cunning woman. She was executed for witchcraft and is known as the so-called Witch of Neuss.

== Life ==
Hester Jonas was born in Dormagen and moved to Neuss when she married the miller Peter Meurer. At some time after her marriage, she began to suffer from severe epileptic-shocks. She worked as a midwife, but at the same time was also a cunning woman, as she was familiar with herbalism, particularly mandrake.

When Hester Jonas was 64 years of age, she was charged with witchcraft, arrested, examined, tortured and brought before the court of the Mayor of Neuss. Among other charges, the court accused her of having made a deal with the devil. During the first two hearings, held at 15 and 22 November 1635, Hester Jonas denied all charges. Four weeks later, on 19 and 20 December, she was forced to sit on a chair spiked with sharp nails for almost three hours. After being tortured, she confessed to having committed fornication with a black man named "Hans Beelzebub", and to having damaged humans and animals by using black magic. Hester Jonas managed to escape from captivity, but was recaptured shortly after. Jonas repudiated her confession, but her resistance was broken after a violent whipping the next day. She confessed to all charges and the court sentenced her to death by beheading.

On 24 December 1635, she was beheaded by an executioner. Her body was burnt and the ashes were blown away in all cardinal points.

Transcripts of the proceedings are being kept at the city archives of Neuss.

== Trivia ==
- "The Ballad of Hester Jonas" by Peter Maiwald
- German folk rock band Cochise dedicated a song to Jonas
