= Josephine Sabel =

American singer and comedian (1866–1945)

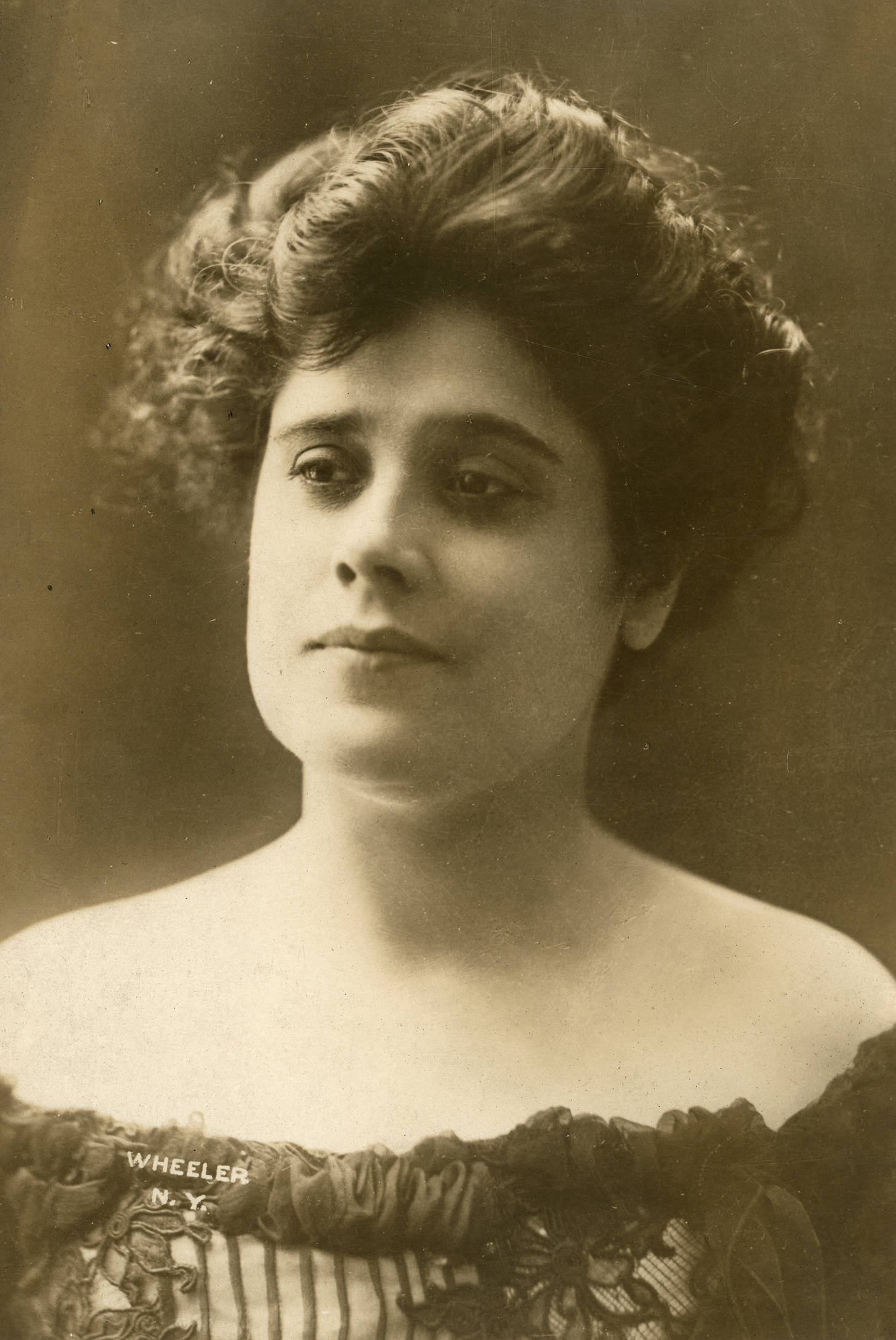
- Sabel in 1911

Background information
- Born: October 3, 1866; Lawrence, Massachusetts, U.S.
- Died: December 24, 1945 (aged 79) Patchogue, New York, U.S.
- Genre: vaudeville
- Instrument: vocals

Josephine Domingue Sabel (October 3, 1866 – December 24, 1945) was an American singer and comedian, billed as "The Queen of Song" in vaudeville.

== Early life ==
Josephine Domingue was born in Lawrence, Massachusetts.

== Career ==
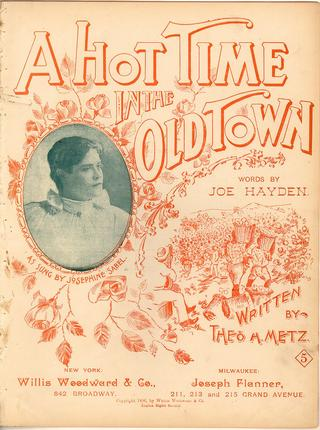
Josephine Sabel on the cover of a sheet music for "A Hot Time in the Old Town" (1896)

Sabel was a vaudeville performer for many years, billed as "The Queen of Song." She popularized songs including "A Hot Time in the Old Town Tonight", "Somebody Loves Me", and "Bicycle Built for Two". She also sang "coon songs" that caricatured African-American speech and culture, for example "Bye Bye Belinda" (written by H. Y. Leavitt, billed as a "Darktown Triumph") and "Little Alabama Coon", an 1893 hit song written by Hattie Starr. She continued performing late in her life, as a nostalgia act in the 1930s.

Sabel's Broadway credits included roles in the musicals Punch, Judy and Company (1903), Earl Carroll's Vanities (1925), Oh Please (1925–1926), and Sidewalks of New York (1927–1928). She appeared in several films: Corn Top Bread (1930), The March of Time (1930, unfinished), and Broadway to Hollywood (1933).

Sabel was not known for a pleasing voice, but for her humor and stage presence. "Miss Sabel does not sing much, and never did," explained a newspaper account in 1904, "Most of her singing is yelling, but she yells well." Critic Frank Norris wrote of her, "Josephine Sabel is not what you would call pretty, but she is French to her fingers and toes, which is much better. She can do precisely what she likes with her audiences — making them laugh or weep or whistle at her will." She emphasized her French connections with the latest fashions from Paris, so that her clothing on and off stage were described in detail in the press.

== Personal life ==
Josephine Domingue married David Sabel, her manager. She died in 1945, aged 79 years, at a care home in Patchogue, New York where she had lived since 1937.
