= Alexey Dmitriev =

Belarusian-born German ice hockey player

- Born: 24 December 1985 (age 39); Minsk, Byelorussian SSR, USSR
- Height: 6 ft 0 in (183 cm)
- Weight: 198 lb (90 kg; 14 st 2 lb)
- Position: Left wing
- Shoots: Left
- Oberliga Nord team Former teams: ESC Moskitos Essen; Iserlohn Roosters; Kölner Haie; Eisbären Berlin; HK Gomel; Düsseldorfer EG
- Playing career: 2001–present

Alexey Dmitriev (born 24 December 1985) is a Belarusian-born German professional ice hockey player currently playing for the ESC Moskitos Essen of the Oberliga Nord

== Playing career ==
Dmitriev moved to Germany from Belarus as a 10-year-old with his family. His father Andrey was also a professional ice hockey player and had represented HC Dynamo Minsk in the Soviet Hockey League before the move to the German lower league team Herner EG, where also Alexey Dmitriev later began his career.

Although Alexey Dmitriev found some early success in inline hockey winning the German championship with Wilhelmshaven Skating Sharks in 2000, he moved on to search for a professional ice hockey career leaving Herne in 2003 and first playing for the lower division team Moskitos Essen for two seasons and then joining the DEL team Iserlohn Roosters in 2005. After two seasons with Iserlohn and a short spell at the lower division team EV Landsberg, Dmitriev joined DEL team Kölner Haie in 2007.

After four seasons with Düsseldorfer EG, Dmitriev returned to his original DEL club, Iserlohn Roosters, on a two-year deal on March 23, 2018.
