= Institute of Archaeology and Ethnography SB RAS =

Research institute in Novosibirsk, Russia

Coordinates: 54.8411°N 83.1130°E

Institute of Archeology and Ethnography of the Siberian Branch of the RAS
- Established: 1990
- Director: Andrei Krivoshapkin
- Owner: Siberian Branch of RAS
- Address: Lavrentyev Prospekt 17, Novosibirsk, 630090, Russia
- Location: Novosibirsk, Russia
- Website: archaeology.nsc.ru

Institute of Archaeology and Ethnography of the Siberian Branch of the RAS, IAET SB RAS (Russian: Институт археологии и этнографии СО РАН, ИАЭТ СО РАН) is a research institute in Novosibirsk, Russia. It was founded in 1990.

== History ==
The Institute was established in 1990 and was part of the United Institute of History, Philology and Philosophy until 2000.

In 2001, the institute became an independent scientific organization. At the beginning of 2002, 240 people worked at the IAET SB RAS, including 2 academicians, 19 doctors of sciences and 42 candidates of sciences.

== General information ==
The Institute studies the history and culture of Eurasia, human habitation during the Pleistocene and Holocene epochs, the development and transformation of ancient cultures in the Stone, Bronze and Iron Ages, as well as in the Middle Ages. The organization also explores the culture of the indigenous peoples of Siberia and the Slavs, and in addition, ethno-social and ethno-political processes in modern societies.

== Archaeology ==
In 1993, in Altai, an archaeological expedition led by an employee of the Institute of Archeology and Ethnography Natalia Polosmak found a mummy of a woman, which is known as the Princess of Ukok. Until 2012, the mummy was in the Museum of the History and Culture of the Peoples of Siberia and the Far East of the institute, after which it was transferred to the National Museum named after A. V. Anokhin of the Altai Republic, however the IAET SB RAS remains the owner of the mummy. In addition to the Institute of Archeology and Ethnography, the mummy was also studied by the Research Institute of Physiology and Fundamental Medicine SB RAMS, the International Tomography Center SB RAS, as well as scientists from Switzerland, Germany and Great Britain.

The organization is engaged in the study of the Denisova Cave. The stationary archaeological camp of the institute operates nearby.

In 2017, the expedition of Natalia Polosmak discovered two ritual complexes with stone figures of the early Middle Ages in the Himalayas within Kashmir, India.

== Museums of the institute ==
- Museum of the History and Culture of the Peoples of Siberia and the Far East is a museum created under the leadership of Academician Alexey Okladnikov in 1968. It covers an area of more than 500 square metres.
- Historical and Architectural Open-air Museum is a museum founded by the initiative of Okladnikov in 1972.

== Journals ==
- Archeology, Ethnography and Anthropology of Eurasia (Археология, этнография и антропология Евразии) is a peer-reviewed scientific journal, published since 2000. The English version is published by the Elsevier and is included in the Scopus database.
