= 13th federal electoral district of Puebla =

Federal electoral district of Mexico

Puebla's 13th
- Electoral district of the Chamber of Deputies of Mexico

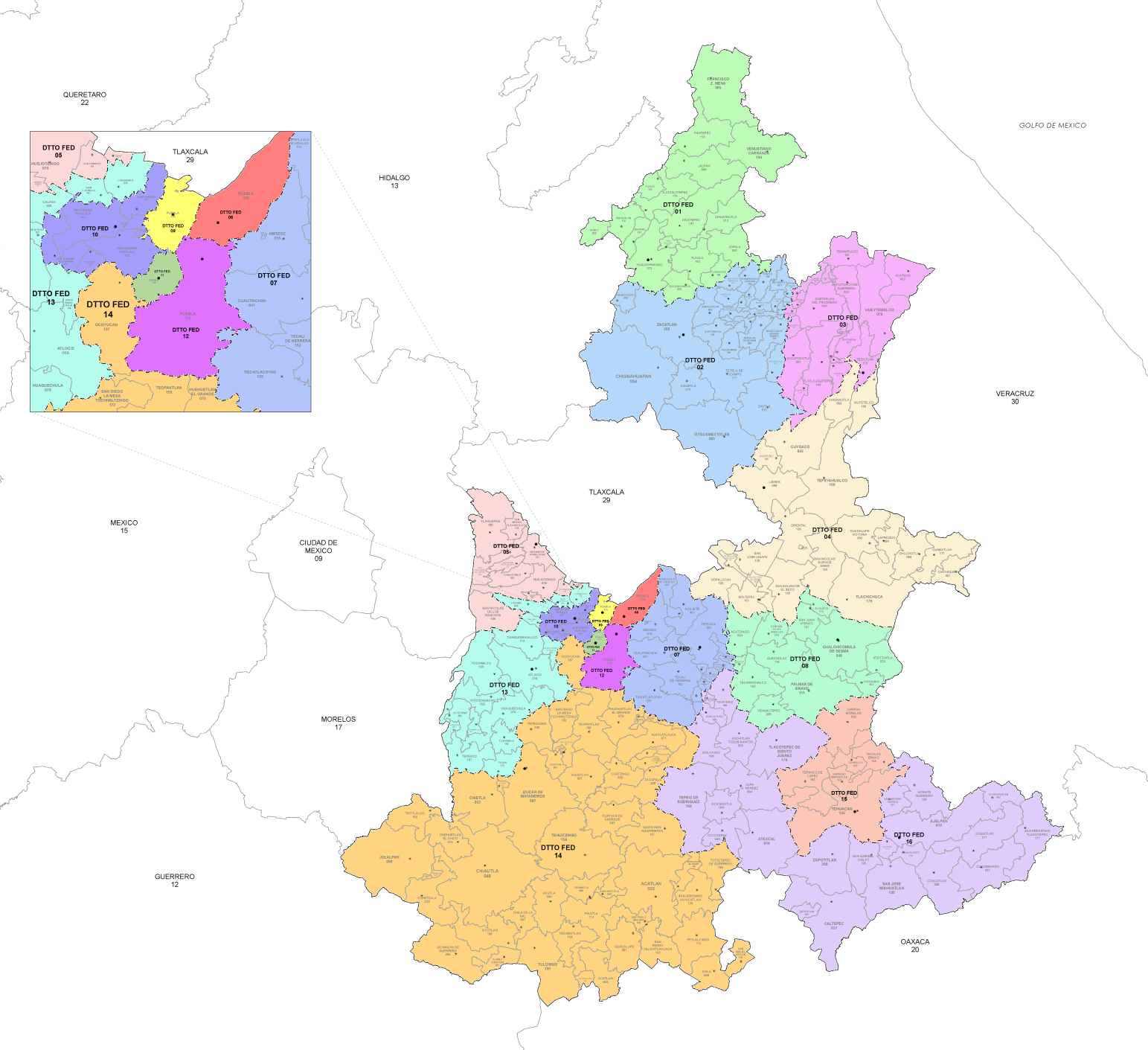
- 13th district since 2023

Incumbent
- Member: Mario Miguel Carrillo
- Party: ▌Morena
- Congress: 66th (2024–2027)

District
- State: Puebla
- Head town: Atlixco
- Coordinates: 18°54′N 98°27′W
- Covers: 16 municipalities: Acteopan, Atlixco, Atzitzihuacán, Calpan, Cohuecán, Coronango, Huaquechula, Juan C. Bonilla, Nealtican, Santa Isabel Cholula, Tepemaxalco, Tepexco, Tianguismanalco, Tilapa, Tlapanalá, Tochimilco
- PR region: Fourth
- Precincts: 167
- Population: 397,346 (2020 census)

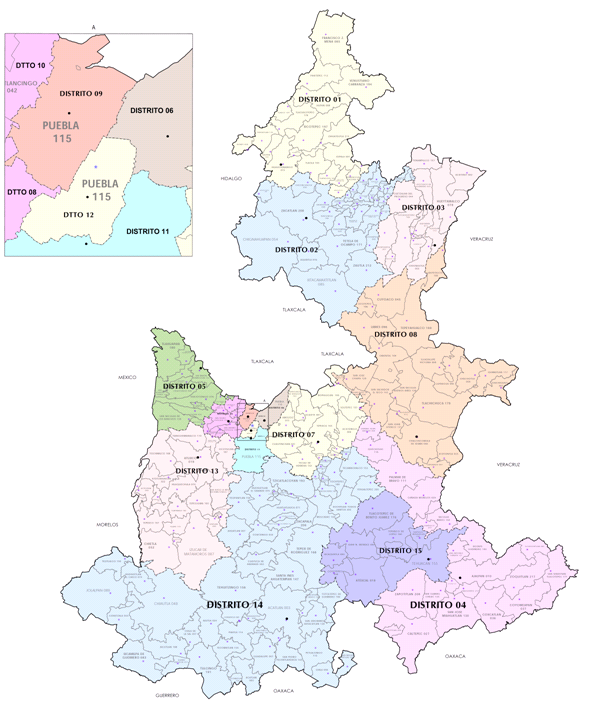
Puebla's districts in 2017–2022

The 13th federal electoral district of Puebla (Spanish: Distrito electoral federal 13 de Puebla) is one of the 300 electoral districts into which Mexico is divided for elections to the federal Chamber of Deputies and one of 16 such districts in the state of Puebla.

It elects one deputy to the lower house of Congress for each three-year legislative session by means of the first-past-the-post system. Votes cast in the district also count towards the calculation of proportional representation ("plurinominal") deputies elected from the fourth region.

Suspended in 1930, (Note: An amendment to Article 52 of the Constitution in 1928 changed the original provision of "one deputy per 60,000 inhabitants" to "one deputy per 100,000"; as a result, the size of the Chamber of Deputies fell from 281 in the 1928 election to 171 in 1934.) Puebla's 13th was re-established as part of the 1977 political reforms. The restored district returned its first deputy in the 1979 mid-term election.

The current member for the district, re-elected in the 2024 general election, is Mario Miguel Carrillo Cubillas of the National Regeneration Movement (Morena).

== District territory ==
Under the 2023 districting plan adopted by the National Electoral Institute (INE), which is to be used for the 2024, 2027 and 2030 federal elections, Puebla's congressional seat allocation rose from 15 to 16. The 13th district is in the west of Puebla and covers 167 electoral precincts (secciones electorales) across 16 of the state's municipalities:

- Acteopan, Atlixco, Atzitzihuacán, Calpan, Cohuecán, Coronango, Huaquechula, Juan C. Bonilla, Nealtican, Santa Isabel Cholula, Tepemaxalco, Tepexco, Tianguismanalco, Tilapa, Tlapanalá and Tochimilco.

The head town (cabecera distrital), where results from individual polling stations are gathered together and tallied, is the city of Atlixco. The district reported a population of 397,346 in the 2020 census.

== Previous districting schemes ==
Evolution of electoral district numbers
	1974	1978	1996	2005	2017	2023
Puebla	10	14	15	16	15	16
Chamber of Deputies	196	300				

2017–2022

From 2017 to 2022, when Puebla was assigned 15 congressional seats, the district's head town was at Atlixco and it covered 21 municipalities in the west of the state:
- Acteopan, Atlixco, Atzala, Atzitzihuacán, Cohuecán, Chietla, Epatlán, Huaquechula, Izúcar de Matamoros, Ocoyucan, San Diego la Mesa Tochimiltzingo, San Martín Totoltepec, Santa Isabel Cholula, Tepemaxalco, Tepeojuma, Tepexco, Tianguismanalco, Tilapa, Tlapanalá, Tochimilco and Xochiltepec.

2005–2017

Under the 2005 plan, the district was one of 16 in Puebla. Its head town was at Atlixco and it covered 31 municipalities.

1996–2005

Between 1996 and 2005, Puebla had 15 districts. The 13th covered 39 municipalities in the south of the state, with its head town at Acatlán de Osorio.

1978–1996

The districting scheme in force from 1978 to 1996 was the result of the 1977 electoral reforms, which increased the number of single-member seats in the Chamber of Deputies from 196 to 300. Under that plan, Puebla's seat allocation rose from 10 to 14. The 13th district's head town was at Izúcar de Matamoros and it comprised 30 municipalities.

== Deputies returned to Congress ==
(Mexico) National parties
- Current
- PAN
- PRI
- PT
- PVEM
- MC
- Morena
- PAZ
- Somos
- Defunct or local only
- PLM
- PNR
- PRM
- PNM
- PP
- PPS
- PARM
- PFCRN
- CON
- PANAL
- PSD
- PES
- PES
- PRD

Puebla's 13th district
Election	Deputy	Party	Term	Legislature
1916	Federico Dinorín		1916–1917	Constituent Congress of Querétaro
...
The 13th district was suspended between 1930 and 1979
1979	Rodolfo Alvarado Hernández	Institutional Revolutionary Party	1979–1982	51st Congress
1982	Víctor Manuel Carreto Fernández de Lara	Institutional Revolutionary Party	1982–1985	52nd Congress
1985	José Manuel López Arroyo	Institutional Revolutionary Party	1985–1988	53rd Congress
1988	Armando Roberto Moreno Nava	Institutional Revolutionary Party	1988–1991	54th Congress
1991	David Silenciario Montesino Marín	Institutional Revolutionary Party	1991–1994	55th Congress
1994	Pedro Pablo Aceves Hernández	Institutional Revolutionary Party	1994–1997	56th Congress
1997	Charbel Jorge Estefan Chidiac	Institutional Revolutionary Party	1997–2000	57th Congress
2000	Adela Cerezo Bautista	Institutional Revolutionary Party	2000–2003	58th Congress
2003	Francisco Alberto Jiménez Merino (Note: Jiménez Merino resigned his seat on 1 February 2005 and was replaced for the remainder of his term by his alternate, Campos Córdova.); Lisandro Arístides Campos Córdova	Institutional Revolutionary Party	2003–2005; 2005–2006	59th Congress
2006	José Guillermo Velázquez Gutiérrez	National Action Party (Mexico)	2006–2009	60th Congress
2009	María Isabel Merlo Talavera	Institutional Revolutionary Party	2009–2012	61st Congress
2012	María del Rocío García Olmedo	Institutional Revolutionary Party	2012–2015	62nd Congress
2015	Juan Manuel Celis Aguirre	Ecologist Green Party of Mexico	2015–2018	63rd Congress
2018	Héctor Jiménez y Meneses	National Regeneration Movement	2018–2021	64th Congress
2021	Mario Miguel Carrillo Cubillas	National Regeneration Movement	2021–2024	65th Congress
2024	Mario Miguel Carrillo Cubillas	National Regeneration Movement	2024–2027	66th Congress

== Presidential elections ==
Puebla's 13th district
Election	District won by	Party or coalition	%
2018	Andrés Manuel López Obrador	Juntos Haremos Historia	55.5382
2024	Claudia Sheinbaum Pardo	Sigamos Haciendo Historia	67.4233
