= Huaquechula (municipality) =

- Municipality
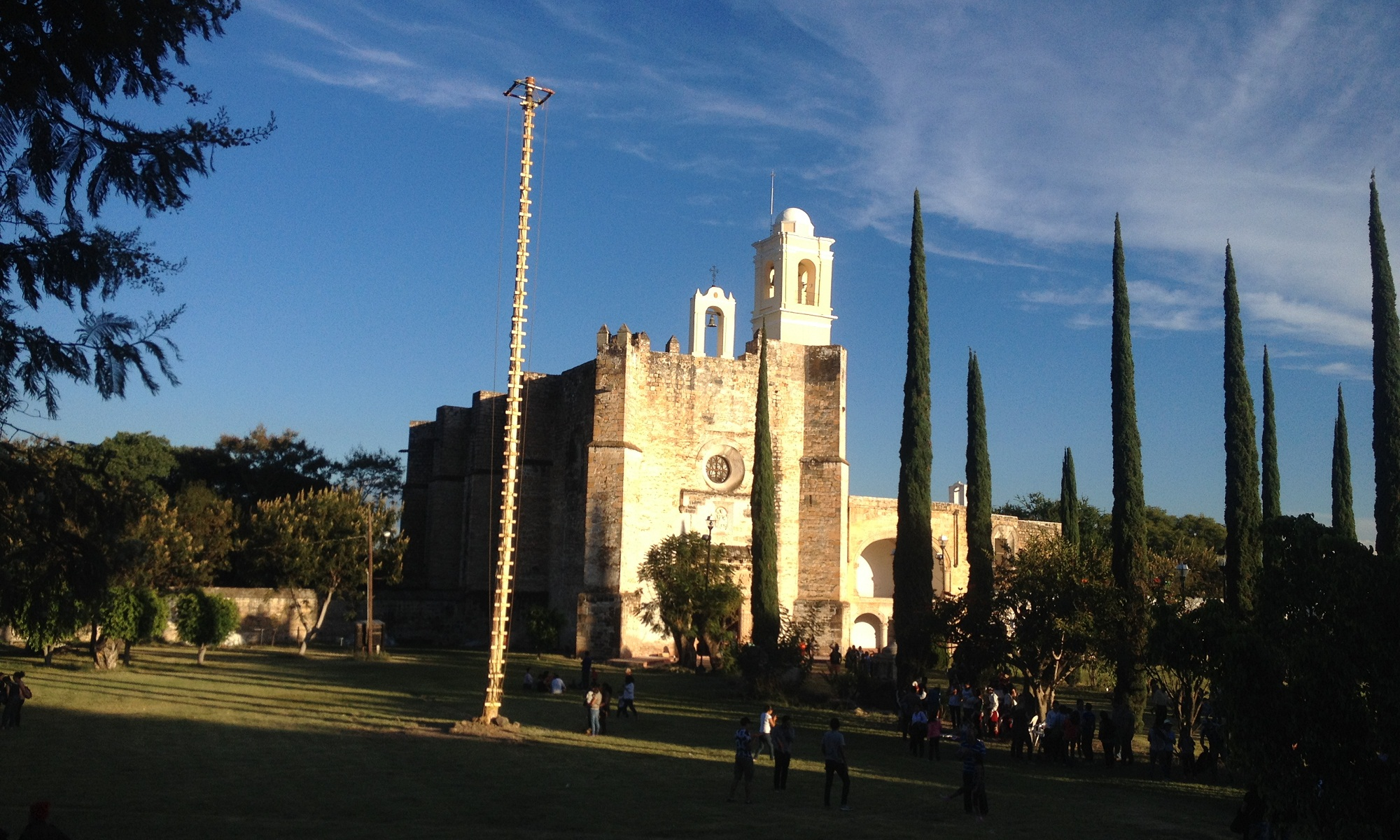
- Ex Convent

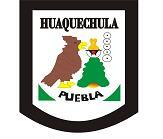
- Coat of arms

- Location of the municipality in Puebla
- Coordinates: 18.7681°N 98.5419°W
- Country: Mexico
- State: Puebla
- Municipal seat: Huaquechula
- Time zone: UTC-6 (Zona Centro)
- Website: huaquechula.gob.mx

Huaquechula is a municipality in the Mexican state of Puebla. The municipal seat is at Huaquechula.

== The municipality ==
The town of Huaquechula is the local governmental authority for thirty communities, which together cover an area of 223.25 km^{2}. The municipal government consists of a municipal president, one syndic, and eight representatives for the various communities. This municipality of the same name borders the municipalities of Atzitzihuacán, Atlixco, Tlapanala, Tepeojuma and Tepemaxalco. (encmuc) The largest of the communities outside of the seat are Santa Ana Coatepec, Cacaloxúchitl, El Tronconal, Teocalco de Dorantes, Tezonteopan de Bonilla, San Juan Huiluco, Soledad Morelos, San Antonio Cuautla, Santiago Tetla and San Diego Organal.

The municipality is located mostly in the Atlixco Valley, with a small portion in the Matamoros Valley, wedged between the Sierra Mixteca and the Popocatépetl volcano. It has altitudes ranging from 1700 meters above sea level to 1500 from north to south. The highest elevation inside the municipality is the Cerro el Metate.

Its rivers run north to south descending from Popocatepetl, including the Río Grande, the Ahuehuello, the Matadero, the Atila and the Nexapa. There is also a system of canals connected to these natural waterways especially in the northeast.

The municipality has three main climate zones. The first is semi hot and semi humid with rains in the summer. This extends over most of the territory, except the northeast and the southwest. The southeast has a hot and semi moist climate with rains in the summer. The rainy season extends from June to November with a short dry spell in the middle. Freezing temperatures can occur from ten to thirty days per year.

Wild vegetation in the municipality varies from low deciduous rainforest, areas of secondary vegetation, dry scrub, grassland and areas dominated by palm trees. Dominant wildlife includes the squirrel, skunk and deer.
