= María Isabel Merlo Talavera =

Mexican politician

- Born: 30 December 1960 (age 65); Huaquechula, Puebla, Mexico
- Occupation: Politician
- Political party: PRI

María Isabel Merlo Talavera (born 30 December 1960) is a Mexican politician from the Institutional Revolutionary Party (PRI).

In the 2009 mid-terms she was elected to the Chamber of Deputies to represent Puebla's 13th district during the 61st session of Congress. She also served as a local deputy in the 56th session of the Congress of Puebla and as the municipal president of Huaquechula from 1996 to 1999.
