= Atlixco FC =

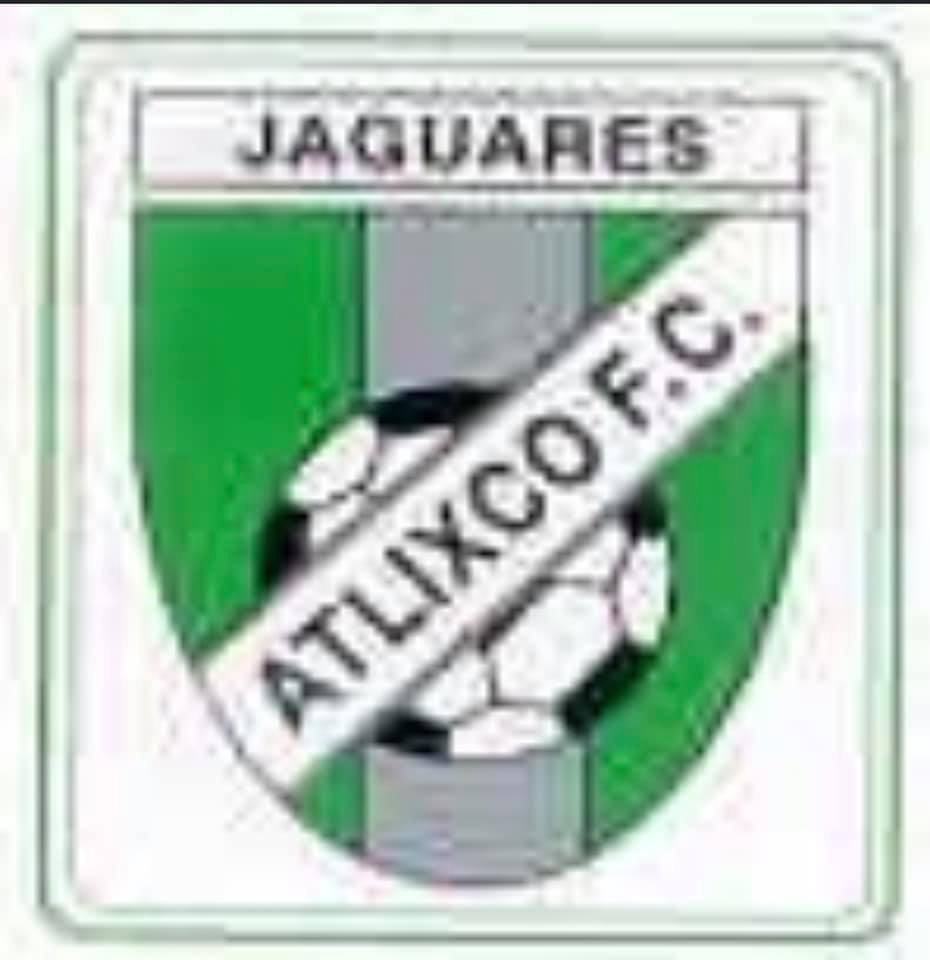
- Full name: Atlixco Futbol Club
- Nickname: Jaguares
- Founded: 8 February 1954; 71 years ago
- Ground: Estadio El Potrero, Atlixco, Puebla
- Capacity: 1,000
- League: Tercera División de México
Home colours	Away colours

Atlixco FC is a Mexican football club that plays in the Tercera División de México. The club is based in Atlixco, Puebla and was founded in 1954.

== History ==
Atlixco FC was founded in 1954 when local youths came together and decided to form Atlixco Futbol Club led by Padre de San Agustín Carlos Martínez. It represented the City of Atlixco. This came to be in La Cancha La Concha where they would play home games against rivals such as Club San Salvador.

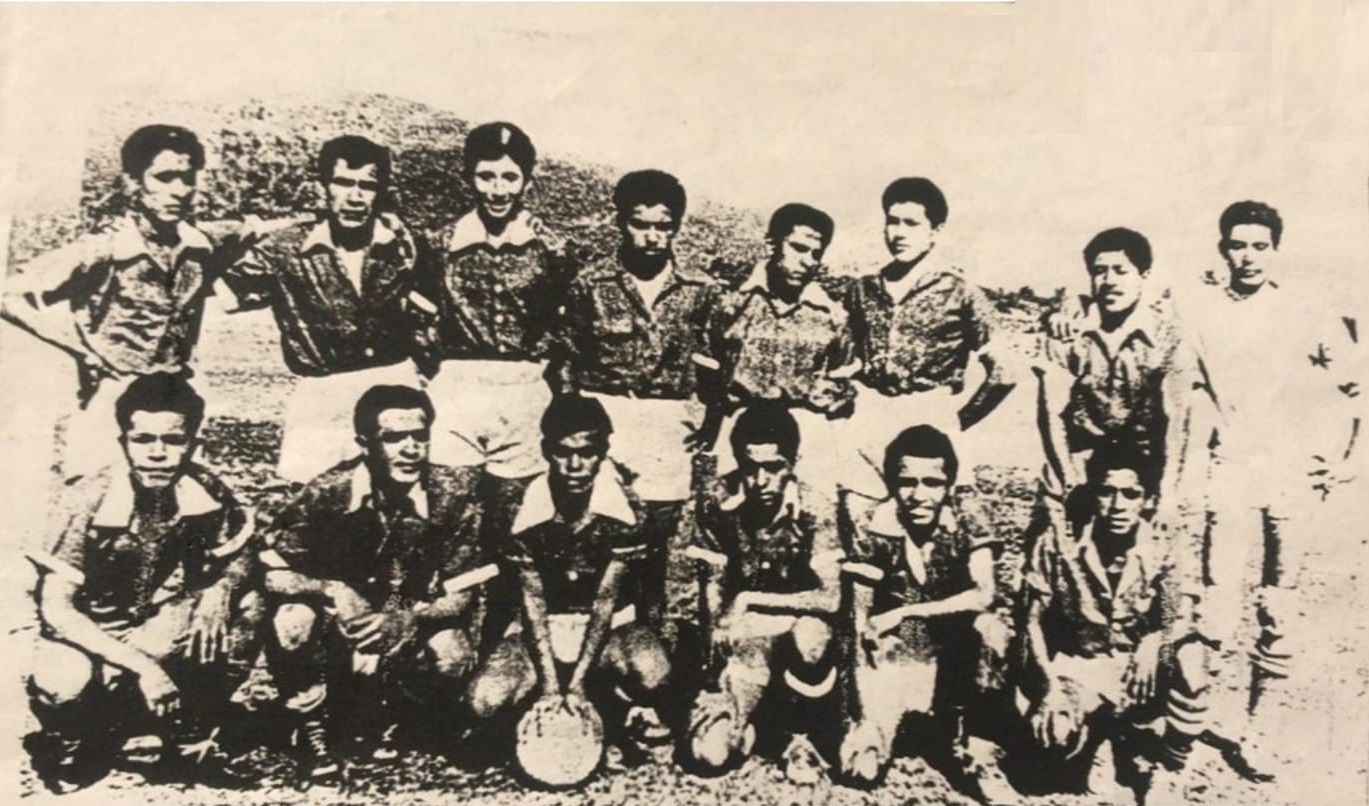
Atlixco 1954

First Team

- Leopoldo Baleón
- Rafael Paramo
- Ignacio Novoa
- Alfonso Espinoza*
- Martín Ramírez
- José Alvarado
- Damaso Alvarado
- Adolfo García
- Luis Valencia Flores
- Armando Rosas
- Honorio Pintle

=== Jaguares ===
In 1995 the club joined forces and represented the Universidad Cuauhtémoc first in the third division and then in the second division . The club played its first games in Atlixco, then played in the Estadio Olímpico Ignacio Zaragoza a few miles north in Puebla City. In the 1996–97 season the club managed to make the playoffs but was eliminated in the round of 16.

=== Recent Years ===
It was announced in October 2021 that Atlixco FC would join the United Premier Soccer League .

== Kit ==
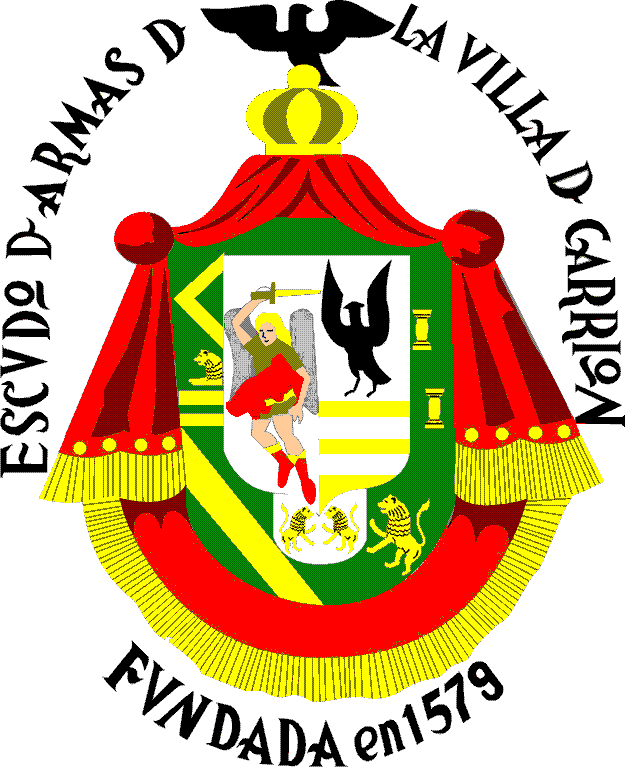
City crest has been used thought the clubs history at varies times

Atlixco FC started off wearing a green shirt with white shorts and green socks in the 1950s due to Padre de San Agustín Carlos Martínez in honor of Club Leon who was his home town club from Guanajuato. In the 1960s, the club adopted adopt red and white vertical stripes for their home kit and a white Jersey with black shorts with white socks for their away games. In 1967 the club used green in their home jersey, similar to Sporting CP because Artur Da Silva Pedro who had just migrated to Mexico from Portugal had sponsored the team's uniform, while playing for the squad that year. In 1979 the club used a Navy Blue Jersey and White shorts do to honor the city of Atlixco celebrating its 400-year anniversary.

=== Past Jerseys ===
First kit evolution Home

1954	1967	1970	1979	1983	1988

=== Jaguares ===
Jaguares

1995	1996	1998	2005

== Honours ==
- Liga Regional 1983–84, 1984–85
- Campeon De Campeones 1984-85

== See also ==
- Football in Mexico
- Atlixco
- Tercera División de México
