= Lisandro Campos Córdova =

Mexican politician

- Born: 27 June 1957 (age 69)
- Occupation: Politician
- Political party: PRI

Lisandro Arístides Campos Córdova (Note: In this Mexican name, the surname is Campos and the second or maternal family name is Córdova.) (born 27 June 1957) is a Mexican politician affiliated with the Institutional Revolutionary Party (PRI).

In 2005–2006 he sat in the Chamber of Deputies to represent Puebla's 13th district during the latter half of the 59th Congress as the alternate of Francisco Alberto Jiménez Merino. From 2008 to 2011, he was the municipal president of Tepexi de Rodríguez, Puebla.

In the 2012 general election he was elected in his own right to the Chamber of Deputies for Puebla's 16th district for the 62nd Congress.

He was elected for a further three-year term as municipal president of Tepexi de Rodríguez in 2021.
