= Same-sex marriage in Puebla =

Same-sex marriage is legal in Puebla, following a ruling from the Supreme Court of Justice of the Nation, issued on 1 August 2017, that the state's same-sex marriage ban violated Articles 1 and 4 of the Constitution of Mexico. The ruling was officially published in the Official Journal of the Federation on 16 February 2018. The Congress of Puebla passed a bill codifying same-sex marriage into state law on 3 November 2020, amending various articles of the Civil Code to reflect the Supreme Court ruling. The law was signed by Governor Miguel Barbosa Huerta, and took effect on 11 November 2020.

== Legal history ==
=== Background ===
The Supreme Court of Justice of the Nation ruled on 12 June 2015 that state bans on same-sex marriage are unconstitutional nationwide. The court's ruling is considered a "jurisprudential thesis" and did not invalidate state laws, meaning that same-sex couples denied the right to marry would still have to seek individual amparos in court. The ruling standardized the procedures for judges and courts throughout Mexico to approve all applications for same-sex marriages and made the approval mandatory. Specifically, the court ruled that bans on same-sex marriage violate Articles 1 and 4 of the Constitution of Mexico. Article 1 of the Constitution states:

Any form of discrimination, based on ethnic or national origin, gender, age, disabilities, social status, medical conditions, religion, opinions, sexual orientation, marital status, or any other form, which violates the human dignity or seeks to annul or diminish the rights and freedoms of the people, is prohibited. (Note: In some official and indigenous languages of Puebla: Spanish: Queda prohibida toda discriminación motivada por origen étnico o nacional, el género, la edad, las discapacidades, la condición social, las condiciones de salud, la religión, las opiniones, las preferencias sexuales, el estado civil o cualquier otra que atente contra la dignidad humana y tenga por objeto anular o menoscabar los derechos y libertades de las personas.; Nahuatl: Majmauilo nochi tlaixpinaualistli ika maseualtsitsi katli euani tomexkotlali, siuatl uan tlakatl, ininxiui, uan katli amo ueli motekipanolia, maseualmej, melauatlajkayotl, teotlanejnewili, tlatsintokilistli, kualtiloni pakilistli, sanimanyotl nemili o akinijki kichiuas tlaixpanoli ika maseual tlaixpinauali uan kipia tamantli tlaixkotonali o tlaijtlakoli tlen tlamelaualistli uan tlamakixtiistli ika maseualmej.; Otomi: Hingi tsa da t’utsa ya jä’i num’u ngu ra mengu ka ya hnini hñätho, ne ha ra ñ’oho ua ra m’ehñä, ra jeya gä mets’i, ha nxotho ra jä’i, hä ua hin’ä bojä, ha hingi dathi, ne te ma nijä pa, xa nthäti ua hin’ä ne ha ua ma n’a ngu embi t’uni ra m’ui gä mu’i di thegi di mu’i ra n’yo ya jä’i.; Totonac: Nixli’anat lalakgapalan akxni talakgxtapali kilhtsukut, minat, kata, tatuwajnit, tatakgsat, takanajla, takgalhchiwin, talakgatin, talatamat osu tu sipani latamana chu laktlawa osu chuxu xlakgchanat chu xlikstu xtapakgsit latamananin.; Popoloca: Kohya kjuachaxín tsondáchro chojni kixin ijnko nkexro la kahño tjetoan kixin ti nkexrín tsjehe o̱ ti nketín kjui̱xin, á ndoa o̱ ichjin, ti náno chonta, nkojín ichin chonta, á chonta chichaon o̱ nahí, á nihi o̱ nahí, nke ni̱nko itji, nexrín tjenka̱yáxin, nkehe tóxríhi̱n ts’ona, á tsíkote̱he o̱ nahí la kain ti nkehe ts’ándáxi éxi n chojni o̱ sich’exin meno ijnko nkexro la tsakitsjehe ti kjuachaxín chonta nkojnko chojni sich’e ti nkehe tsjinkaon.)

An important recognition case was granted via amparo on 29 January 2014. A same-sex couple, married in 2012 in Mexico City, filed an amparo against the Mexican Social Security Institute (IMSS) after it had refused to register one of the partners for spousal benefits. In a landmark ruling, the Supreme Court ruled that the IMSS was required to recognize the marriage. On 15 October 2014, an amparo for thirteen couples was filed with the support of Equal Marriage Mexico (Matrimonio Igualitario México) and the Citizens Observatory of Sexual and Reproductive Rights (Observatorio Ciudadano de Derechos Sexuales y Reproductivos) seeking to have the state's same-sex marriage ban declared unconstitutional. In March 2015, reports surfaced that a judge had ruled against the couples citing the requirement that they "prove their homosexuality". Activists slammed this as a delay tactic and appealed to the Supreme Court. On 5 May 2016, the court ruled that the state's same-sex marriage ban was unconstitutional and discriminatory, and allowed the plaintiff couples to marry. On 1 June 2016, the Supreme Court issued a similar ruling in a case involving fifteen couples.

In November 2014, a federal court granted Guadalupe Gómez Tetetla and Fabiola Lucero Méndeza an amparo. The couple had filed the amparo earlier that year after their request for a marriage license had been rejected. The state appealed the decision, and an appellate court upheld the ruling on 10 July 2015. Their wedding, which was the first same-sex marriage in the state of Puebla, took place on 1 August 2015. In September 2016, officials in the municipality of San Pedro Cholula announced that any same-sex couple who wishes to marry in the municipality may do so without hindrance, citing nationwide jurisprudence established by the Supreme Court.

=== Early bills ===
On 7 December 2006, a civil union bill, similar to the law submitted in Mexico City, was proposed in Puebla, but it faced strong opposition and criticism from deputies of the Institutional Revolutionary Party (PRI) and the National Action Party (PAN), which declared that "the traditional family [was] the only social model, and there [could not] be another one." The civil union bill was proposed again on 15 March 2011. After five reviews in the ensuing years, the bill was postponed until a later legislative session on 8 June 2014. On 29 September 2014, the Congress of Puebla announced that there would be no discussion in that legislative term. Activists organized a march on 8 November 2014 urging the Congress to legalize same-sex marriage. Congress rejected a civil union bill in December 2014. The Party of the Democratic Revolution (PRD), which supported the measure, announced its intention to re-introduce a similar bill in 2015. On 11 June 2015, a PRD deputy submitted a marriage bill instead, citing national court decisions in favor of same-sex marriage. In June 2016, state officials announced they would postpone a vote on the legislation until after the Supreme Court ruled on the action of unconstitutionality filed in April 2016.

=== Action of unconstitutionality and passage of legislation ===
On 27 April 2016, the National Human Rights Commission filed an action of unconstitutionality (acción de inconstitucionalidad; docketed 29/2016) against the state of Puebla, contesting the constitutionality of articles 294, 297 and 300 of the Civil Code. The Congress of Puebla had recently amended state family law, but left the same-sex marriage ban in place. The lawsuit sought to legalize same-sex marriage in Puebla, similarly to what had happened in Jalisco, where the Supreme Court struck down that state's same-sex marriage ban in a unanimous ruling in early 2016. Article 294 defined marriage as the union of "a man and a woman" whose goal was "perpetuating the species", and article 297 similarly defined concubinage as between "a man and a woman". Article 300 required the "man and woman" to be at least 16 years of age. On 1 August 2017, the Supreme Court ruled unanimously that the three articles violated Articles 1 and 4 of the Constitution of Mexico. In late January 2018, despite opposition from Congress, the civil registry announced it would abide by the ruling and start processing marriage applications from same-sex couples. The ruling officially came into effect upon publication in the Official Gazette of the Federation (Diario Oficial de la Federación) on 16 February 2018. State officials have also confirmed that the court ruling permits same-sex couples to adopt.

In October 2018, Deputy María García Olmedo from the Institutional Revolutionary Party introduced a bill to Congress to codify same-sex marriage in the Civil Code. On 4 October 2019, a Congress committee voted against decriminalizing abortion, and updating state law to reflect the Supreme Court's ruling on same-sex marriage. (Note: At the time, article 294 of the Civil Code read: El matrimonio es un contrato civil, por el cual un sólo hombre y una sola mujer, se unen en sociedad para perpetuar la especie y ayudarse en la lucha por la existencia., translating to "Marriage is a civil contract by which one man and one woman unite in partnership to perpetuate the species and to help each other in the struggle for existence.") Shortly following the vote, Deputy García Olmedo filed a legal challenge with the Supreme Court, arguing that Congress' refusal to amend state law to recognize same-sex marriages in accordance with the Supreme Court ruling was unconstitutional. García Olmedo also accused deputies of the National Regeneration Movement (MORENA), who mostly voted for the measure, of "betrayal", as the party was elected on a platform supporting LGBT rights and same-sex marriage. On 30 October 2020, a Congress committee voted 4–2 with 1 abstention in favor of a same-sex marriage bill introduced by Deputy Vianey García Romero. On 3 November 2020, Congress approved the legislation 31–5. The law was published in the official state journal on 10 November, following Governor Miguel Barbosa Huerta's signature, and took effect the following day. Article 294 of the Civil Code now reads: Marriage is a civil contract by which two persons voluntarily unite in partnership to live a shared life, with respect, mutual support, and equality of rights and obligations. (Note: Spanish: El matrimonio es un contrato civil por el cual dos personas se unen voluntariamente en sociedad, para llevar una vida en común, con respeto, ayuda mutua e igualdad de derechos y obligaciones.)

3 November 2020 vote in the Congress
Party	Voted for	Voted against	Abstained	Absent (Did not vote)
National Regeneration Movement	13: Gabriel Biestro Medinilla; Arturo de Rosas Cuevas; Tonantzin Fernández Díaz; Olga Garci Crespo; Rafaela García Romero; Luis Jara Vargas; Emilio Maurer Espinosa; Bárbara Morán Añorve; Estefanía Rodríguez Sandoval; Iliana Ruiz García; Fernando Sánchez Sasia; Cristina Tello Rosas; Guadalupe Tlaque Cuazitl	–	–	–
Institutional Revolutionary Party	5: Javier Casique Zarate; Iván Collantes Cabañas; Josefina García Hernández; María García Olmedo; Nibardo Hernández Sánchez	–	–	–
Labor Party	4: Raymundo Atanacio Luna; María Cabrera Camacho; Valentín Medel Hernández; Guadalupe Muciño Muñoz	–	–	1: José Espinosa Torres
National Action Party	–	4: Mónica Della Vecchia; Raúl Espinosa Martínez; Gabriel Jiménez López; Nancy Jiménez Morales	–	1: María Saavedra Fernández
Social Encounter Party	3: Mónica Lara Chávez; Nora Merino Escamilla; José Trujillo de Ita	–	–	–
Citizens' Movement	–	–	2: Alejandra Esquitín Lastiri; Carlos Morales Álvarez	–
Party of the Democratic Revolution	2: José García Avendaño; Liliana Luna Aguirre	–	–	–
Compromiso por Puebla	–	–	1: Uruviel González Vieyra	–
Ecologist Green Party of Mexico	1: Juan Kuri Carballo	–	–	–
New Alliance Party	1: Ángel Islas Maldonado	–	–	–
Independent	2: Hugo Alejo Domínguez; Marcelo García Almaguer	1: Héctor Alonso Granados	–	–
Total	31	5	3	2
Total	75.6%	12.2%	7.3%	4.9%

== Marriage statistics ==
The following table shows the number of same-sex marriages performed in Puebla since 2019 as reported by the National Institute of Statistics and Geography. Figures for 2020 are lower than previous years because of the restrictions in place due to the COVID-19 pandemic. Most marriages take place in Puebla and San Pedro Cholula.

Number of marriages performed in Puebla
Year	Same-sex			Opposite-sex	Total	% same-sex
Year	Female	Male	Total	Opposite-sex	Total	% same-sex
2019	51	40	91	17,058	17,149	0.53%
2020	26	20	46	12,649	12,695	0.36%
2021	66	55	121	16,046	16,167	0.75%
2022	84	53	137	17,095	17,232	0.80%
2023	60	43	103	15,574	15,677	0.66%
2024	53	38	81	16,086	16,177	0.50%

== Public opinion ==
A 2017 opinion poll conducted by the Strategic Communication Office (Gabinete de Comunicación Estratégica) found that 48.5% of Puebla residents supported same-sex marriage, while 48% were opposed. According to a 2018 survey by the National Institute of Statistics and Geography, 37% of the Puebla public opposed same-sex marriage.

== See also ==
- Same-sex marriage in Mexico
- LGBT rights in Mexico
