= Rocío García Olmedo =

Mexican politician

- Born: 30 April 1957 (age 69); Puebla, Mexico
- Occupation: Politician
- Political party: PRI
- Website: rociogarciaolmedo.com

María del Rocío García Olmedo (born 30 April 1957) is a Mexican politician affiliated with the Institutional Revolutionary Party (PRI).

In the 2012 general election she was elected to the Chamber of Deputies to represent Puebla's 13th district during the 62nd session of Congress.

In 2018, as a member of the Congress of Puebla, she presented a draft amendment to the state's civil code to allow same-sex marriage in the state. Puebla ultimately legalised same-sex marriage in November 2020.
