= José Guillermo Velázquez Gutiérrez =

Mexican politician (born 1969)

- Born: 26 November 1969 (age 56); Puebla, Mexico
- Occupation: Politician
- Political party: PAN

José Guillermo Velázquez Gutiérrez (born 26 November 1969) is a Mexican politician from the National Action Party (PAN). In the 2006 general election he was elected to the Chamber of Deputies to represent Puebla's 13th district during the 60th session of Congress (28 August 2006 to 1 September 2009).
