= Lienzo de Quauhquechollan =

16th-century lienzo (cloth painting) of the Nahua

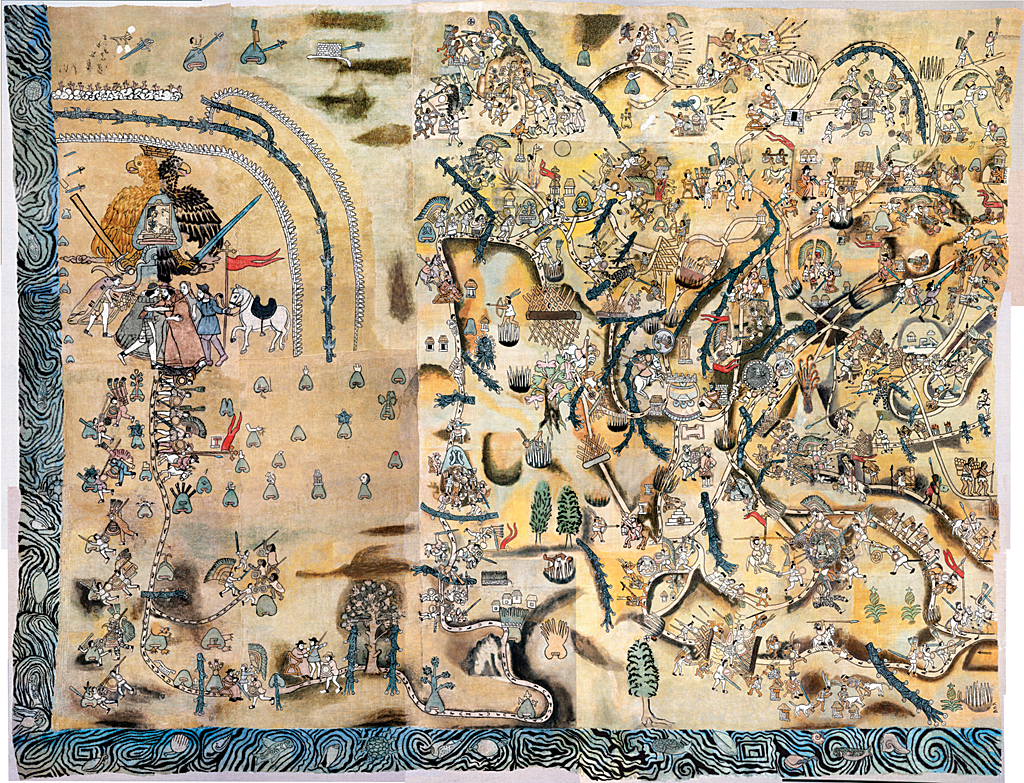
Photograph of the Lienzo de Quauhquechollan after its restoration, in 2009.

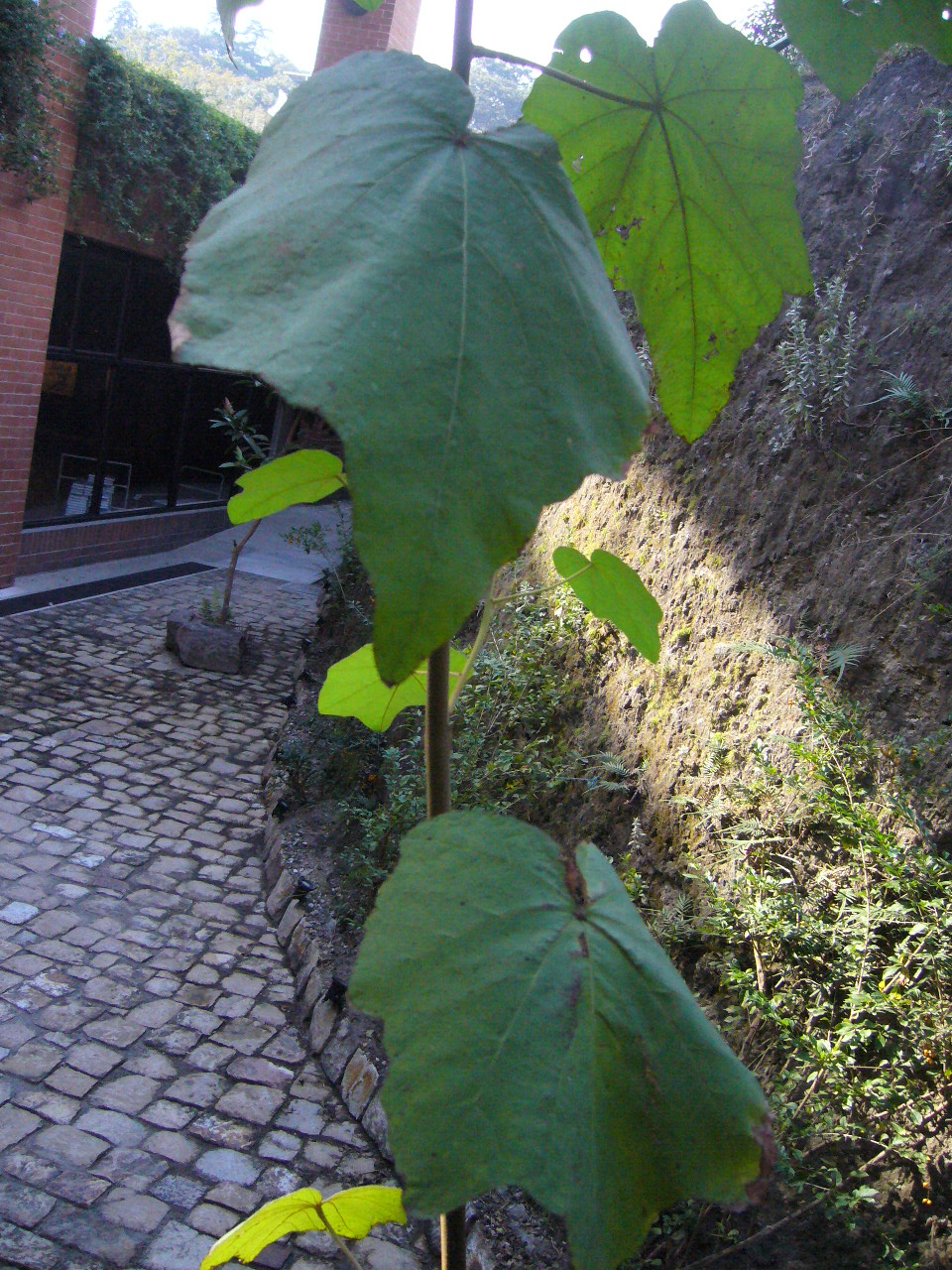
Canak, or hands tree Chiranthodendron pentadactylon. Its leaves are used in certain tamales. It has medicinal properties. It is mentioned on the Lienzo de Quauhquechollan.

The Lienzo de Quauhquechollan ("Quauhquechollan Cloth") is a 16th-century lienzo (cloth painting) of the Nahua, a group of indigenous peoples of Mexico. It is one of two surviving Nahua pictorial records recounting the Spanish conquest of Guatemala and the earliest surviving maps of what is now Guatemala.

The Lienzo was probably painted in Ciudad Vieja, in the modern Guatemalan department of Sacatepéquez, by Nahua allies of the Spanish from the city of Quauhquechollan (now known as San Martín Huaquechula). These allies had assisted conquistador Jorge de Alvarado in his campaign of 1527 to 1529. The Quauhquechollan allies settled in the Guatemalan Highlands and the cloth records their participation in the Spanish conquest of Mexico and Guatemala. The original document is currently in the Museo Regional de Cholula, in Puebla in central Mexico.

The Lienzo de Quauhquechollan was deciphered by the Dutch archaeologist Florine Asselbergs (Leiden University, The Netherlands) in 2002. She was the first to identify the cloth as depicting Jorge de Alvarado's campaign and to recognise the role of Quauhquechollan in the Spanish conquest. Her path-breaking work has been published in the book Conquered Conquistadors in 2004. This book offers a detailed and fully contextualised analysis of the Lienzo and is considered one of the best books on the Spanish conquest of Guatemala.

In 2007, the Universidad Francisco Marroquín in Guatemala created a digitally restored version of the Lienzo de Quauhquechollan as part of its program 'Exploraciones sobre la Historia'. This version of the Lienzo is on display at the same university in the permanent exhibition 'Quauhquechollan, a chronicle of conquest', together with an image of the original Lienzo in real size. The exhibition offers a number of interactive ways to acquaint oneself with the Lienzo.

== Manufacture ==
The Lienzo de Quauhquechollan was made sometime in the 1530s; it consists of 15 individual pieces of painted cotton stitched together to form a large map. The pieces are of differing sizes and manufacture and some of them are reused. The complete Lienzo de Quauhquechollan measures 3.25 by 2.35 metres (10.7 by 7.7 ft) (width by height). The Lienzo was executed in a central Mexican style using indigenous artistic conventions to portray a mixture of Nahua and Spanish subjects. The main focus of the map lies within the borders of modern Guatemala, specifically the area around Chimaltenango and Santiago de los Caballeros de Guatemala, the colonial capital. The Lienzo concentrates upon the role of the Quauhquechollan allies in the conquest, their travels and the battles they took part in. It was executed by more than one artist, as evidenced by stylistic differences in the painting.

== Provenance ==
The earliest mention of the Lienzo de Quauhquechollan, under the name of the Lienzo de la Academia de Puebla ("Cloth of the Puebla Academy"), dates to the final decade of the 19th century when it was in the collection of the Puebla Painting Academy, although its provenance was unknown. It has various pieces of paper fixed beside the images and bearing text using the Latin alphabet, although these are very poorly preserved and no longer readable.

== Content ==
The lienzo before its restoration

The top left corner of the Lienzo de Quauhquechollan is illustrated with the place glyph representing Quauhquechollan combined with the Habsburg coat of arms. Spanish conquistador Hernán Cortés is shown embracing a Quauhaquechollan noble. Both are accompanied by their retinues and the scene includes an exchange of gifts. Another scene shows Jorge de Alvarado at the head of a large army as they depart from Quauhquechollan; the army itself is mixed, containing both Spanish and Nahuas. All the Quauhquechollans are depicted bearing Spanish swords, a privilege bestowed upon some of the native allies of the conquistadors.

The route of the army on its march to Guatemala is depicted, including Tehuantepec in Oaxaca and the Soconusco region of lowland Chiapas (both within the borders of modern Mexico). In Guatemala, the army passes through Retalhuleu, Zapotitlán and Suchitepéquez. It enters the K'iche', Kaqchikel and Pipil kingdoms, as well as the Verapaz region and the Cuchumatanes. The army is shown engaging in a number of battles.

Even though Pedro de Alvarado, Jorge de Alvarado's brother, had previously conquered parts of Guatemala, by 1527 most of the area was in open and hostile rebellion. The Lienzo records the first substantial conquest of Guatemala, and reveals that it were Jorge de Alvarado and his allies who are to be credited for this, and not his brother Pedro as had long been thought by historians. The Lienzo also discloses the previously underestimated role of Nahua conquistadors in the Spanish conquest.

== See also ==
- Lienzo de Tlaxcala
