= Lienzo =

Canvas painted with indigenous Mesoamerican pictorial writing

In ethnohistory, a lienzo (Spanish for "canvas") is a sheet of cloth painted with indigenous Mesoamerican pictorial writing. A famous example is the Lienzo de Quauhquechollan, which is rare Nahua depiction of the Spanish Conquest of Guatemala.

== See also ==
- Mesoamerican writing systems
