= Adela Cerezo Bautista =

Mexican politician (born 1961)

- Born: 21 March 1962 (age 64); Molcaxac, Puebla, Mexico
- Occupation: Politician
- Political party: PRI

Adela Cerezo Bautista (born 21 March 1962) is a Mexican politician from the Institutional Revolutionary Party. From 2000 to 2003, she was a deputy of the LVIII Legislature of the Mexican Congress representing Puebla.
