= Francisco Alberto Jiménez Merino =

Mexican politician

Alberto Jiménez Merino
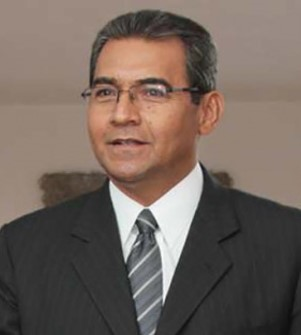
- Born: 25 September 1959 (age 66); Tecomatlán, Puebla, Mexico
- Occupation: Politician
- Political party: PRI

Francisco Alberto Jiménez Merino (born 25 September 1959) is a Mexican politician affiliated with the Institutional Revolutionary Party (PRI).

A graduate of Chapingo Autonomous University, he later served as rector of the same institution from 1991 to 1995.

In the 2003 mid-terms he was elected to the Chamber of Deputies to represent Puebla's 13th district during the 59th session of Congress. He returned to Congress in the 2009 mid-terms (61st session) for Puebla's 14th district.
