= Huaquechula =

Huaquechila
- City
- Huaquechula
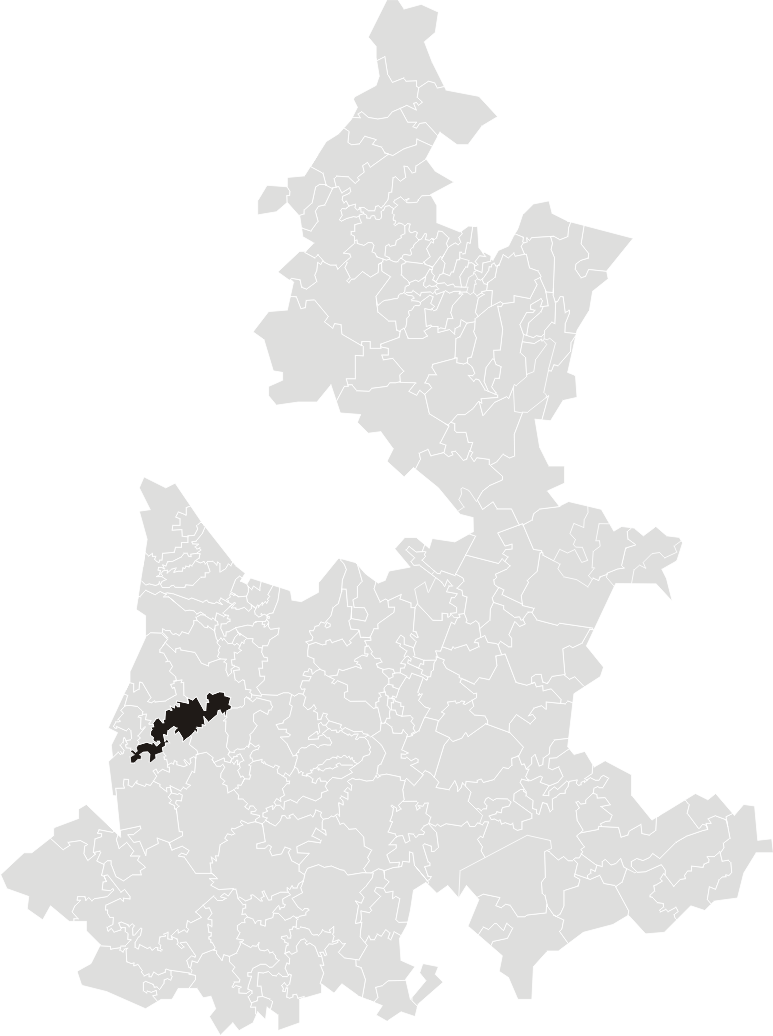
- Location of municipality

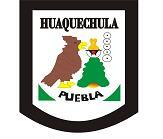
- Coat of arms
- Interactive map of Huaquechila
- Coordinates: 18°46′00″N 98°33′00″W
- Country: Mexico
- State: Puebla
- Founded: 1110 (official)
- Municipal Status: 1895

Government
  - Municipal President: Raúl Marín Espinoza

Population (2005)Municipality
  - Municipality: 26,114
- Time zone: UTC−6 (Central (US Central))
- Website: www.huaquechula.gob.mx

Huaquechula is a town in Huaquechula Municipality located in state of Puebla in central Mexico. The settlement dates back at least as far as 1110 CE although its center has moved to twice to its current location. Since its founding, it has been an agricultural community, today raising crops such as peanuts, corn and sorghum, although there are some handcrafts as well. The town is known for its traditions related to the Feast of the Cross, but even more so for its “cabo del año” altars on Day of the Dead, which are dedicated to family members who have died during the previous year. These have been declared a cultural heritage of the state of Puebla and bring tourists to the town, mostly from Puebla.

== The town ==
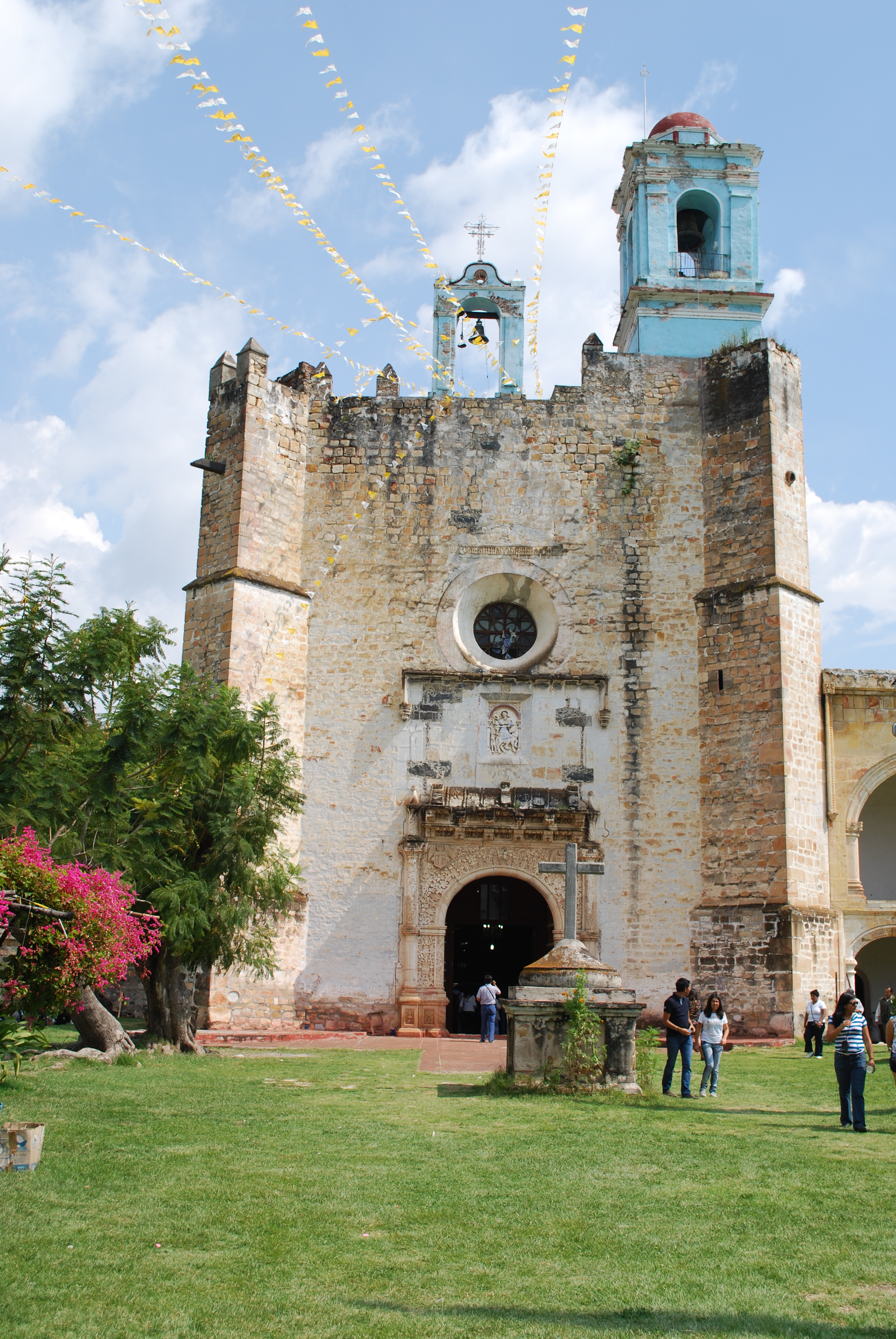
Former monastery of San Martín de Tours

The town of Huaquechula is about sixty km from the state capital, in the western part of the state. It is centered on a main plaza, which has pieces representing the area's past such as a calendar stone, fragments of a stone head of Quetzalcoatl and tombstone with the date written in according to the Aztec calendar. The plaza's fountain is made of black sandstone. Facing this plaza are the municipal “palace” a parish church, a cultural center called Cuauhquechollan and a former monastery from the 16th century.

The monastery was begun in 1531 and was finished in 1580, built by the Franciscan order, with attribution to Juan de Alameda, whose remains are buried there. It is similar to the monastery in Huejotzingo, though it lacks that building's pre-Hispanic symbolism. The facade is Plateresque with a richly adorned main portal in sandstone. The open chapel is Gothic. The main altarpiece in the monastery is also Plateresque and dates from the 17th century and is over ten meters high and five meters wide. The former cloister area is now a local museum. The walls still contains remnants of the monastery's rich mural work, and the rooms contains archeological pieces, copies of various codices and a section dedicated to Day of the Dead. In front, there is a stone cross over an image of the world and images of the sun and moon.

The town also has other reminders of its long history. The Piedra Máscara (Stone Mask) monument is located on the old road to San Juan Vallarta. It represents the old gods of the pre Hispanic population. The Piedra del Sol y la Luna (Stone of the Sun and Moon) is located on the old road to Xonaca, and depicts a lunar eclipse. The Piedra del Coyote (Coyote Stone) is near the river that leads to Xonaca. It represents the death of a coyote. A cross was later erected over this stone.

The patron saint is Saint Francis of Assisi, whose feast day is celebrated on October 4.

== Socioeconomics ==
As has been for centuries, the economy is based on agriculture, growing peanuts, corn, onions and sorghum, along with livestock and basic commerce. Traditional handcrafts include wax items, items made from tin and pressed glass such as jars, candelabras and incense burners, often with reliefs of angels, the Virgin Mary and flowers.

== Cabo del año altars and the Feast of the Holy Cross ==
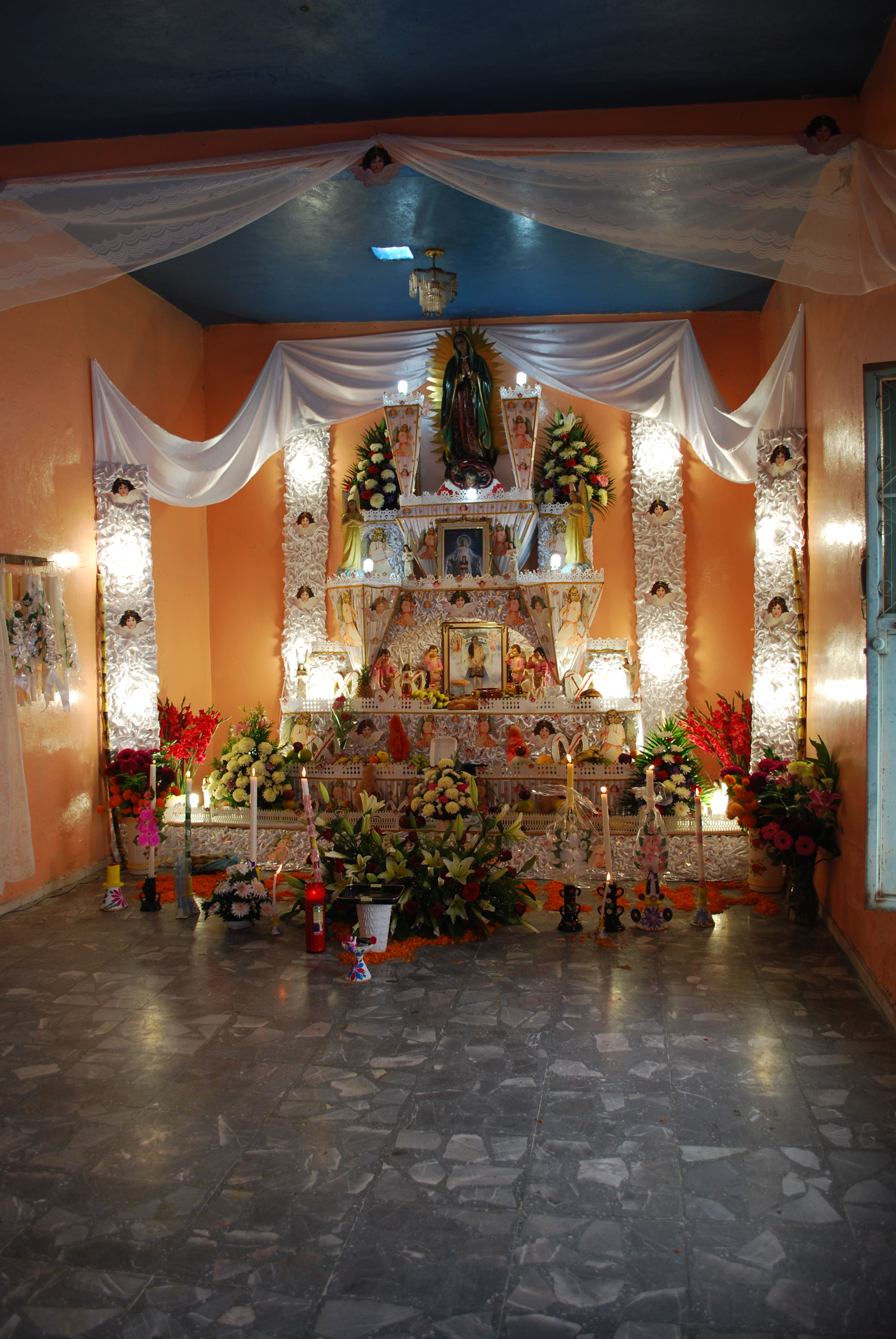

The town is known for two annual events, with traditions found nowhere else. The better known of these is the creation of “cabo del año” (end of the year) altars for family members who have died in the past year. Like the rest of Mexico, residents of Huaquechula celebrate Day of the Dead, with the traditional “ofrenda” or altar for all loved ones, but those who have died received their own altar on the first Day of the Dead after their demise. These altars are generally very large in the form of a pyramid, covered in white satin or crepe paper, folded and gathered over the facade to simulate clouds. The upper levels are supported with columns, most often in Baroque estipite. The altars are a fusion of pre Hispanic ornamental tradition and altars originally created for Maundy Thursday, which accounts for their white character. They are constructed anew for each recently deceased and materials can cost between 3,000 and 15,000 pesos, depending on size and richness of adornment.

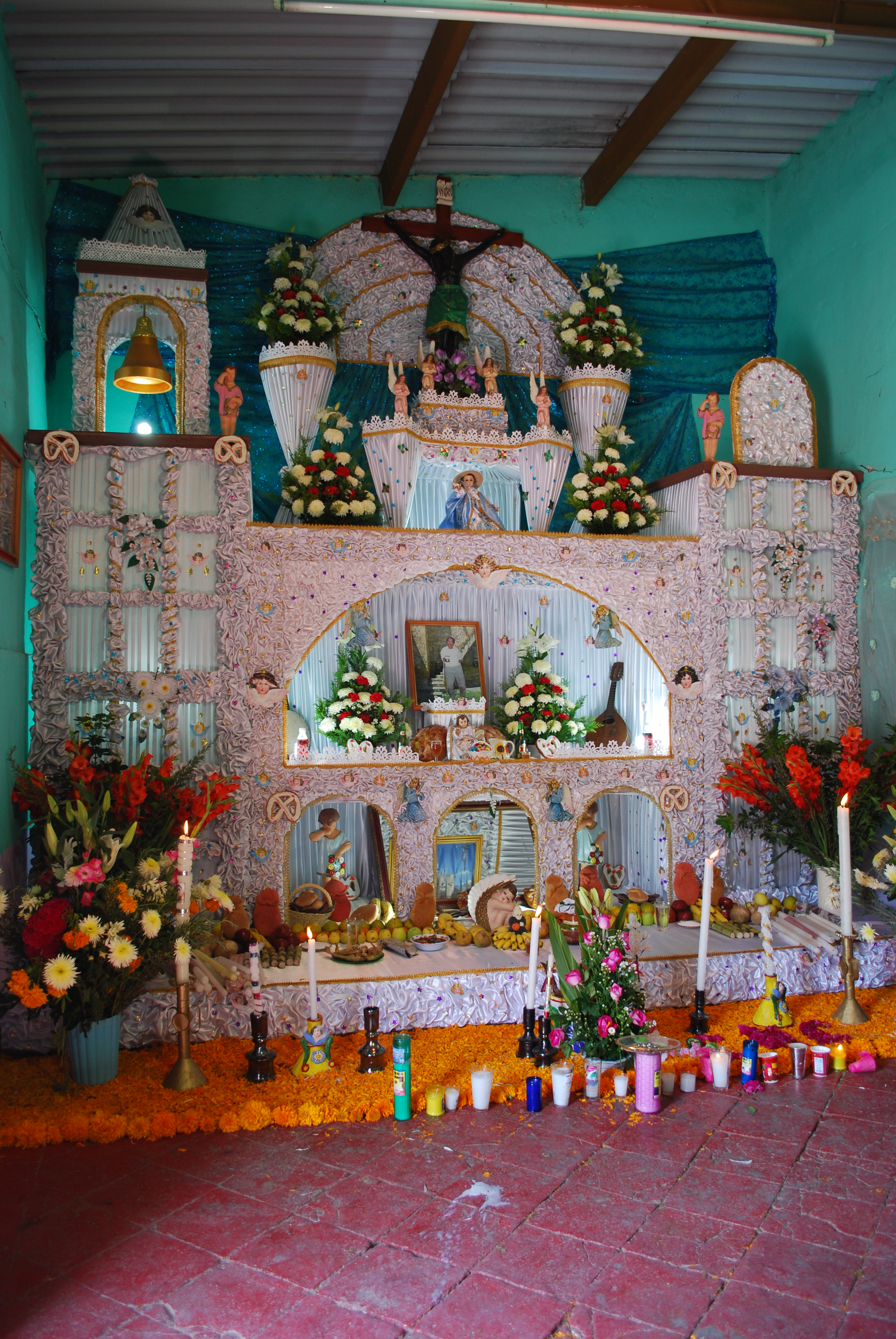

Most cabo del año altars have three levels although sometimes this varies. The lowest level represents life on earth for the deceased. A photograph of the person is placed in the center, traditionally arranged so that it can be viewed only indirectly with a mirror. There are several theories as to why, such as the mirror represents the entrance to the beyond or underworld, a representation of eternity or a symbol that the person is no longer here. Around the photo are various offerings of things that the person liked in life. The most common are food items such as plates of mole, tamales, sweets, fruit, hot chocolate, atole, tequila, mezcal and beer. There are also particular breads baked for these kinds of altars in this town such as “hojaldra” to represent the skull and bones of the deceased, a “rosquete” to represent the face and pan de muerto to represent the human body covered in its own blood (sugar colored red). There are also wax candles to give light in the darkness, twelve images of angels, one for every month of the year, incense and images of crying angels to represent the bereaved family. There can also be sugar miniatures of animals such as sheep, ducks and donkeys, especially if the deceased was a child. The second level is dedicated to the link between humanity and the Divine, as well as heaven. Here images of angels, the Virgin Mary and the Host can be found along with religious relics and candles of various sizes. In many of the altars today, these have been replaced all or in part with electric bulbs. Decorative elements include sugar skulls, incense burners and marigold flowers. The third level is dedicated to the Divine, often represented with a cross or an image of the Trinity.

These altars are placed in a front hall or other room close to the main front entrance. Most often they are open to be viewed by the public on November 1 and 2. Custom requires that these families offer food and drink to visitors and includes traditional foods such as hot chocolate, atole, mole, tamales and bread. Most tourists to this event come from the state of Puebla but it has started to attract visitors from other parts of Mexico and abroad. Although families with these altars are in mourning, most are also proud to show this particular custom to visitors and talk about the deceased's life. The altars were declared part of the Cultural Heritage of Puebla in 1977.

One major festival is that of the Feast of the Holy Cross, which dates back far into the colonial period. It has a community cross made from basalt called the “Cruz de Huaquechula” which is incrusted with various relics related to the original cross of Christ. It is said to be so heavy that it cannot be lifted unless the bearers pray and the church plays a special melody on its bells. The festival lasts nine days beginning in April ending on May 3, with mass, traditional dance, food and music played by bands playing wind instruments, and fireworks set off from large frames in the shape bulls. The event has been named part of the Cultural Heritage of Puebla. During this event, traditional festive wear such as that of the charro and the China Poblana can be seen.

== History ==
The name glyph in the Nahuatl language was a hill with the heads of an eagle and a roseate spoonbill.

The name comes from Nahuatl cuauhquechollan meaning "place of eagles and roseate spoonbills".

The settlement dates back to 1110CE, founded by groups of Xicalancas and Teochichimecas, just north of the current town center. In 1200, the town was refounded by the Nahuas, just south of the modern town layout which was established by the Spanish in 1520. In the early 16th century, the place was the site of an armed clash between Tlaxcaltecas and Mexicas in which the former wreaked havoc. A son of Moctezuma Xocoyotzin ('Moctezuma the Younger', or Moctezuma II; c.1466-June 29, 1520), the Huey Tlatoani of the Mexicas from 1502 until 1520, died there in combat.

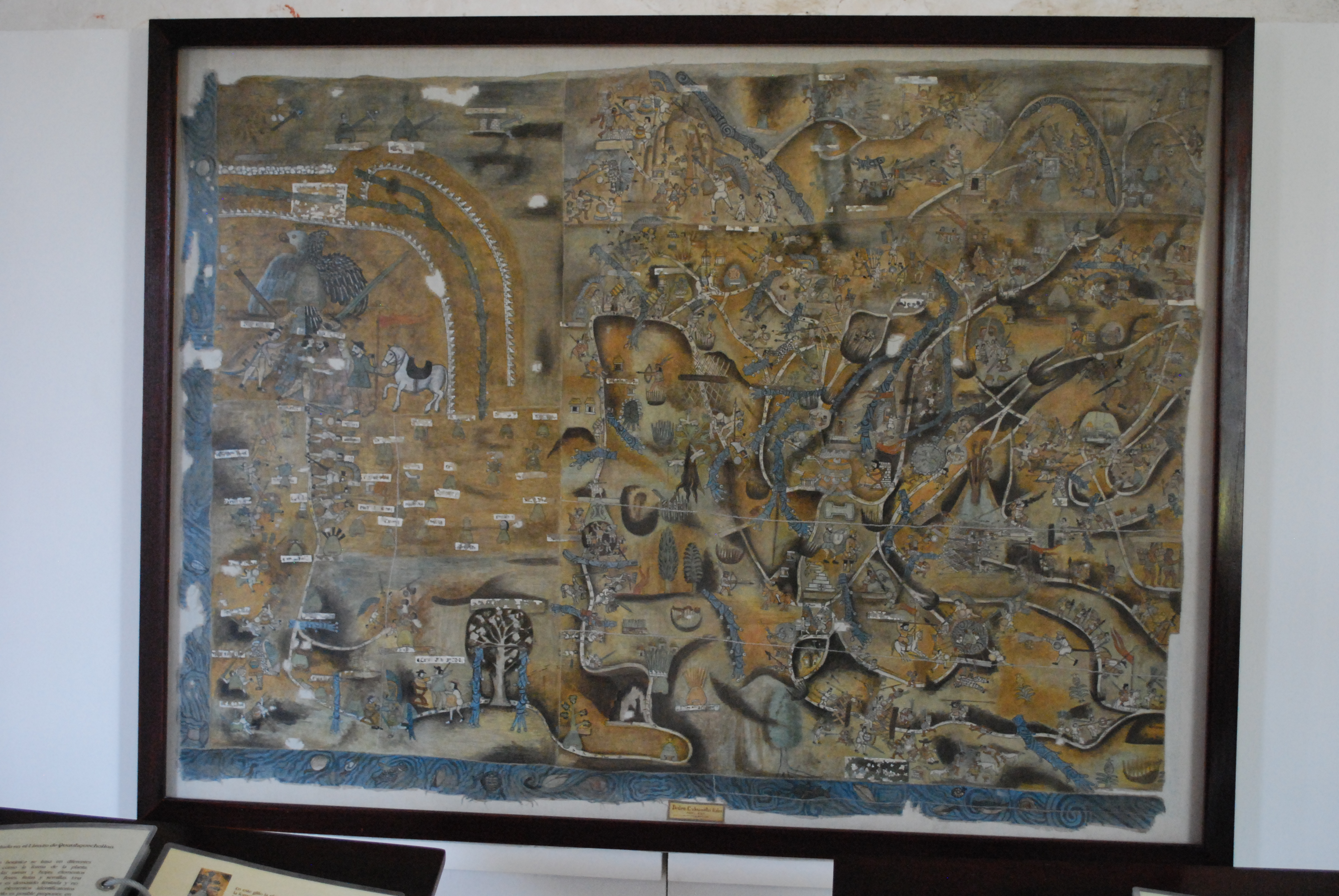
Copy of the Lienzo de Quauhquechollan in the monastery museum

The area was part of the route that provided supplies and soldiers for the conquest of Tenochtitlan. After this, the area came under the control of Jorge de Alvarado in 1524. In the 17th century, it came under the direct control of the Spanish Crown as part of the Atlixco district. In 1895, it was made an independent municipality.

== See also ==
- Lienzo de Quauhquechollan
