= Tochimilco =

- Municipality and town
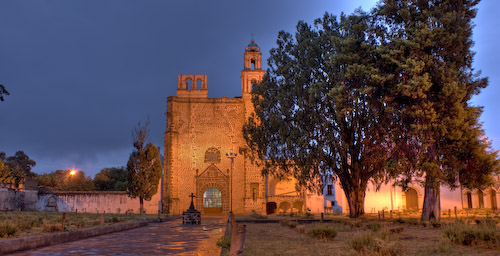
- Former Convent of the Assumption in Tochimilco

- Location within Puebla (state) Location within Mexico
- Coordinates: 18°54′N 98°34′W
- Country: Mexico
- State: Puebla
- Time zone: UTC-6 (Zona Centro)
- Website: http://www.tochimilco.gob.mx/

Tochimilco is one of 217 municipalities in the Mexican state of Puebla. The municipal seat is the town of Tochimilco.

== See also ==
- Monasteries on the slopes of Popocatépetl, a UNESCO World Heritage Site
