= Tlapanalá =

Coordinates: 16°32′N 96°14′W

- Municipality and town
- Interactive map of Tlapanalá
- Country: Mexico
- State: Puebla
- Time zone: UTC-6 (Zona Centro)

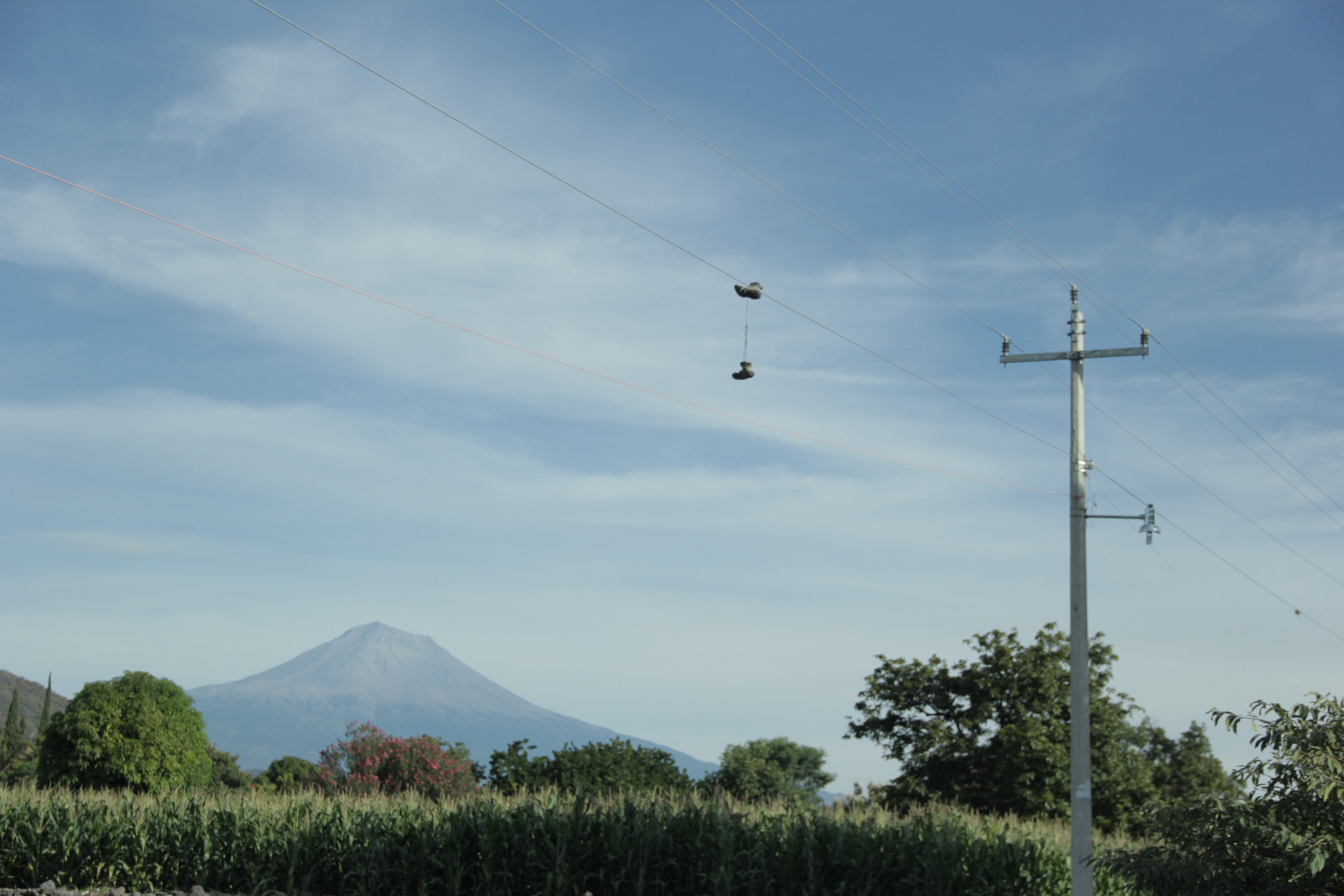
View of the volcano from the municipality of Tlapanalá, Puebla.

Tlapanalá is a town and municipality in the Mexican state of Puebla.
