= Calpan =

Coordinates: 19°06′N 98°27′W

- Municipality and town
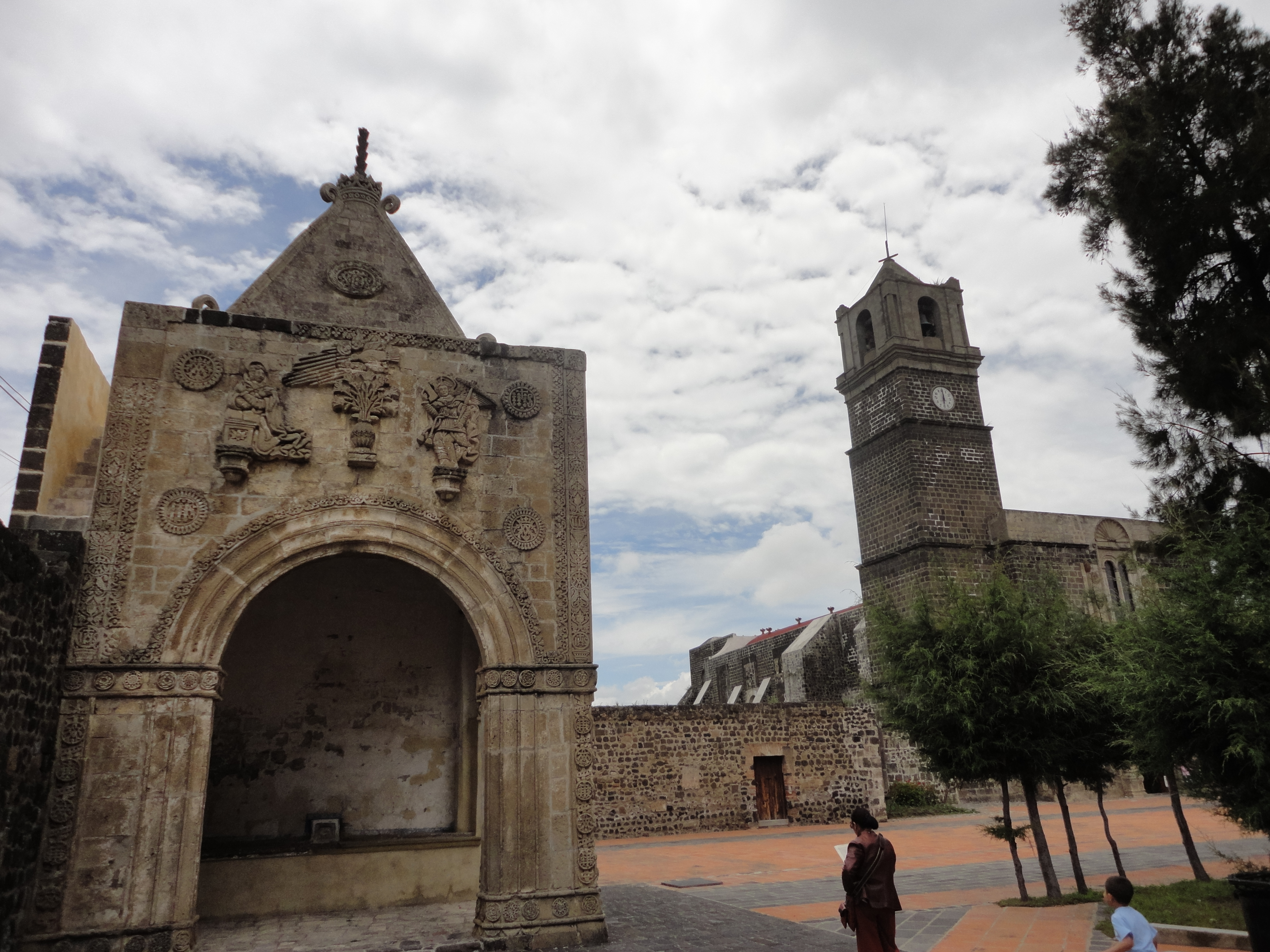

- Coat of arms

- Location of the municipality in Puebla
- Country: Mexico
- State: Puebla
- Time zone: UTC-6 (Zona Centro)

Calpan is a municipality in the Mexican state of Puebla.

== History ==
Calpan was a Nahuatl-speaking community prior to the Spanish incursion, and it had close dynastic ties to Huejotzingo. During the era of New Spain it was Corregidor of Atrisco.
