= Tepemaxalco =

- Municipality and town
- Location in Mexico
- Country: Mexico
- State: Puebla
- Time zone: UTC-6 (Zona Centro)

Tepemaxalco is a town and municipality in the Mexican state of Puebla.
