= Tianguismanalco =

Coordinates: 18°58.6′N 98°26.9′W

- Municipality and town
- Interactive map of Tianguismanalco
- Country: Mexico
- State: Puebla
- Time zone: UTC-6 (Zona Centro)

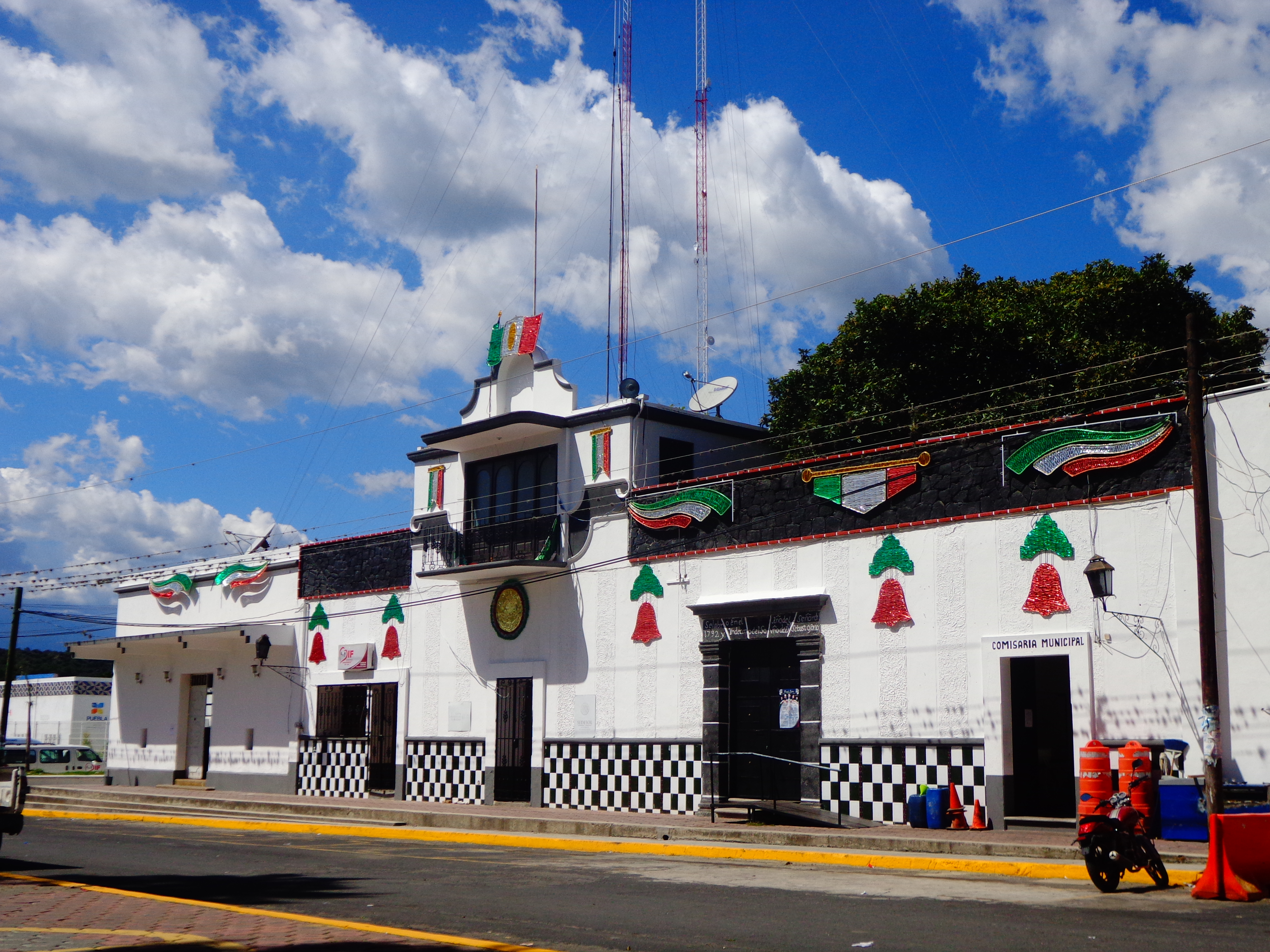
The Palacio Municipal in Tianguismanalco

Tianguismanalco is a town and municipality in the Mexican state of Puebla.
