= Atzitzihuacán =

Coordinates: 18°48′N 98°36′W

- Municipality and town
- Coat of arms
- Interactive map of Atzitzihuacán
- Country: Mexico
- State: Puebla

Population (2020)
  - Total: 12,857
- Time zone: UTC-6 (Zona Centro)

Atzitzihuacán is a town and municipality in the Mexican state of Puebla.
