= 8th federal electoral district of Puebla =

Federal electoral district of Mexico

Puebla's 8th
- Electoral district of the Chamber of Deputies of Mexico

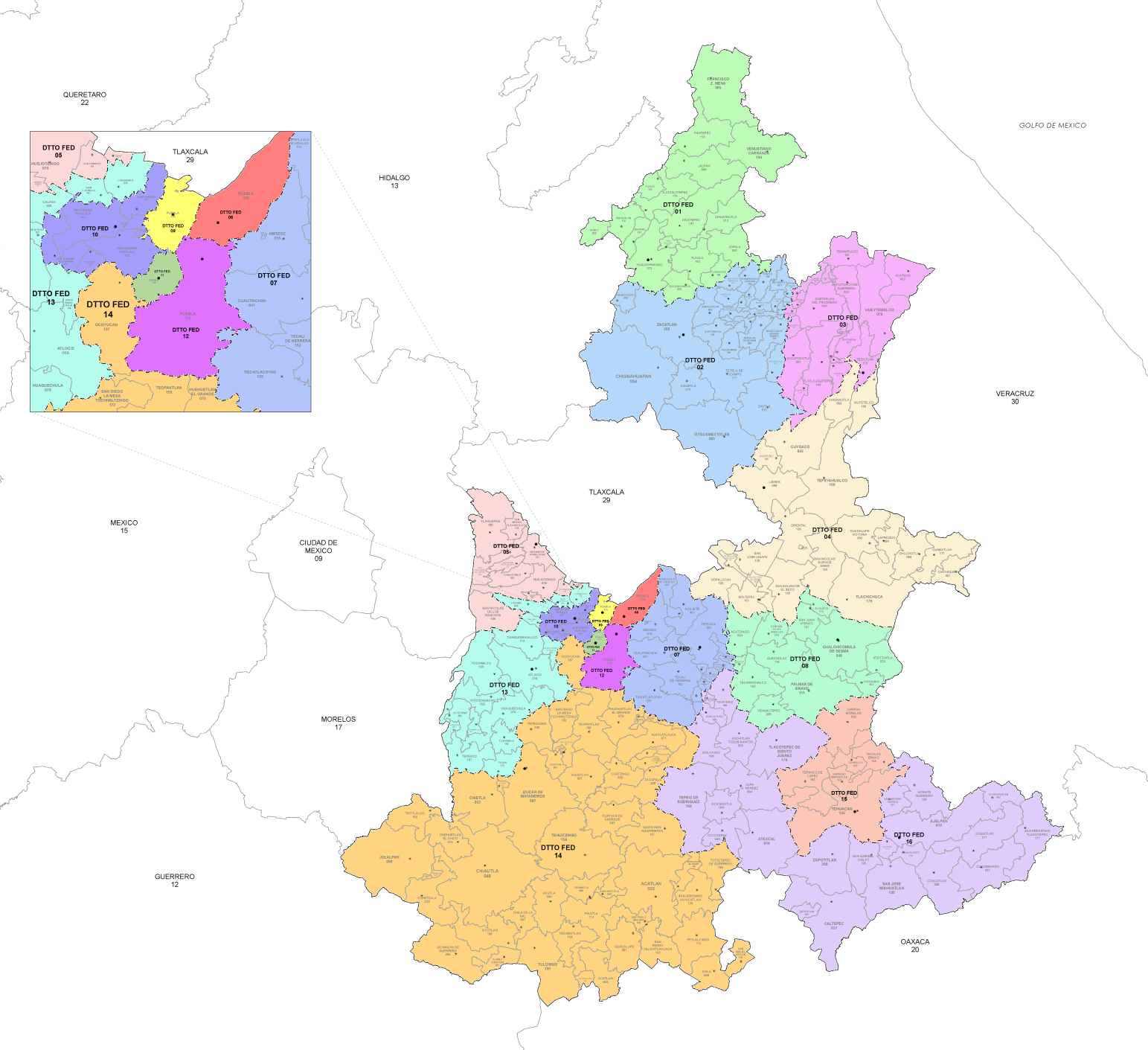
- 8th district since 2023

Incumbent
- Member: Ignacio Mier Bañuelos
- Party: ▌Morena
- Congress: 66th (2024–2027)

District
- State: Puebla
- Head town: Ciudad Serdán
- Coordinates: 18°59′N 97°27′W
- Covers: 12 municipalities: Acatzingo, Aljojuca, Atzitzintla, Chalchicomula de Sesma, Esperanza, General Felipe Ángeles, Palmar de Bravo, Quecholac, San Juan Atenco, San Salvador Huixcolotla, Tecamachalco, Yehualtepec
- PR region: Fourth
- Precincts: 138
- Population: 403,021 (2020 census)

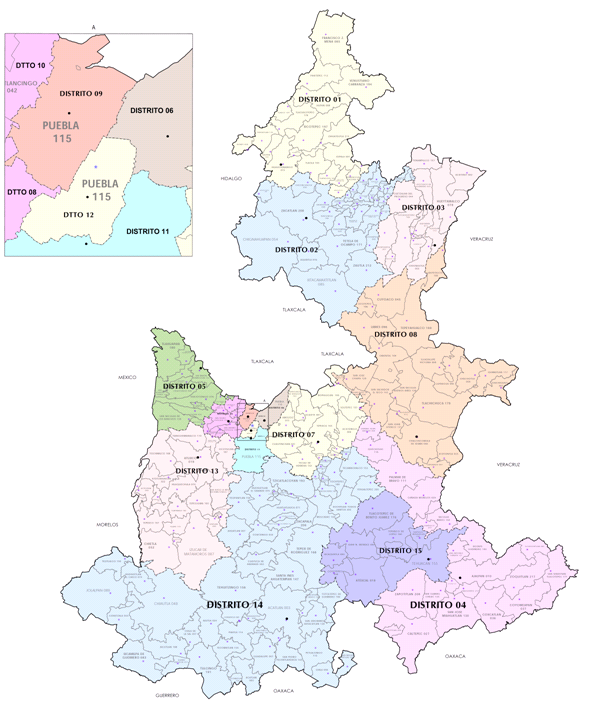
Puebla's districts in 2017–2022

The 8th federal electoral district of Puebla (Spanish: Distrito electoral federal 08 de Puebla) is one of the 300 electoral districts into which Mexico is divided for elections to the federal Chamber of Deputies and one of 16 such districts in the state of Puebla.

It elects one deputy to the lower house of Congress for each three-year legislative session by means of the first-past-the-post system. Votes cast in the district also count towards the calculation of proportional representation ("plurinominal") deputies elected from the fourth region.

The current member for the district, elected in the 2024 general election, is Carlos Ignacio Mier Bañuelos of the National Regeneration Movement (Morena).

== District territory ==
Under the 2023 districting plan adopted by the National Electoral Institute (INE), which is to be used for the 2024, 2027 and 2030 federal elections, Puebla's congressional seat allocation rose from 15 to 16. The 8th district is situated in the east of Puebla and covers 138 electoral precincts (secciones electorales) across 12 of the state's municipalities:

- Acatzingo, Aljojuca, Atzitzintla, Chalchicomula de Sesma, Esperanza, General Felipe Ángeles, Palmar de Bravo, Quecholac, San Juan Atenco, San Salvador Huixcolotla, Tecamachalco and Yehualtepec.

The head town (cabecera distrital), where results from individual polling stations are gathered together and tallied, is Ciudad Serdán, the municipal seat of Chalchicomula. The district reported a population of 403,021 in the 2020 census.

== Previous districting schemes ==
Evolution of electoral district numbers
	1974	1978	1996	2005	2017	2023
Puebla	10	14	15	16	15	16
Chamber of Deputies	196	300				

2017–2022

From 2017 to 2022, when Puebla was assigned 15 congressional seats, the district's head town was at Ciudad Serdán and it covered 22 municipalities:
- Aljojuca, Atzintzintla, Cuyoaco, Chalchicomula de Sesma, Chichiquila, Chilchotla, Esperanza, Guadalupe Victoria, Lafragua, Libres, Mazapiltepec de Juárez, Ocotepec, Oriental, Quimixtlán, Rafael Lara Grajales, San José Chiapa, San Juan Atenco, San Nicolás Buenos Aires, San Salvador el Seco, Tepeyahualco, Tlachichuca and Xiutetelco.

2005–2017

Under the 2005 plan, the district was one of 16 in Puebla. Its head town was at Ciudad Serdán and it covered 13 municipalities:
- Aljojuca, Atzintzintla, Chalchicomula de Sesma, Esperanza, General Felipe Ángeles, Palmar de Bravo, Quecholac, San Juan Atenco, Tecamachalco, Tlachichuca, Tochtepec, Xochitlán Todos Santos and Yehualtepec.

1996–2005

Between 1996 and 2005, Puebla had 15 districts. The 8th covered 15 municipalities, with its head town at Ciudad Serdán.

1978–1996

The districting scheme in force from 1978 to 1996 was the result of the 1977 electoral reforms, which increased the number of single-member seats in the Chamber of Deputies from 196 to 300. Under that plan, Puebla's seat allocation rose from 10 to 14. The 8th district's head town was at Teziutlán in the east of the state and it comprised 14`municipalities.

== Deputies returned to Congress ==
(Mexico) National parties
- Current
- PAN
- PRI
- PT
- PVEM
- MC
- Morena
- PAZ
- Somos
- Defunct or local only
- PLM
- PNR
- PRM
- PNM
- PP
- PPS
- PARM
- PFCRN
- CON
- PANAL
- PSD
- PES
- PES
- PRD

Puebla's 8th district
Election	Deputy	Party	Term	Legislature
1916	José Rivera		1916–1917	Constituent Congress of Querétaro
...
1979	Guillermo Melgarejo Palafox	Institutional Revolutionary Party	1979–1982	51st Congress
1982	Jaime Alcántara Silva	Institutional Revolutionary Party	1982–1985	52nd Congress
1985	Darío Maldonado Casiano	Institutional Revolutionary Party	1985–1988	53rd Congress
1988	Rafael Campos López	Popular Socialist Party (Mexico)	1988–1991	54th Congress
1991	Jaime Olivares Pedro	Institutional Revolutionary Party	1991–1994	55th Congress
1994	Lidia Zarrazaga Molina (Note: Lidia Zarrazaga Molina died on 23 June 1995.); Máximo Cagigal Manilla	Institutional Revolutionary Party	1994–1995; 1995–1997	56th Congress
1997	Moisés Ignacio Mier Velazco	Institutional Revolutionary Party	1997–2000	57th Congress
2000	Jaime Alcántara Silva	Institutional Revolutionary Party	2000–2003	58th Congress
2003	Rafael Moreno Valle Rosas (Note: Moreno Valle resigned his seat on 7 December 2004.); José López Medina	Institutional Revolutionary Party	2003–2004; 2004–2006	59th Congress
2006	Antonio Vasconcelos Rueda	National Action Party (Mexico)	2006–2009	60th Congress
2009	Fernando Morales Martínez	Institutional Revolutionary Party	2009–2012	61st Congress
2012	Ana Isabel Allende Cano	Institutional Revolutionary Party	2012–2015	62nd Congress
2015	Lilia Arminda García Escobar	National Action Party (Mexico)	2015–2018	63rd Congress
2018	Julieta Kristal Vences Valencia	National Regeneration Movement	2018–2021	64th Congress
2021	Odette Nayeri Almazán Múñoz	National Regeneration Movement	2021–2024	65th Congress
2024	Carlos Ignacio Mier Bañuelos	National Regeneration Movement	2024–2027	66th Congress

== Presidential elections ==
Puebla's 8th district
Election	District won by	Party or coalition	%
2018	Andrés Manuel López Obrador	Juntos Haremos Historia	47.0173
2024	Claudia Sheinbaum Pardo	Sigamos Haciendo Historia	72.2473
