= 7th federal electoral district of Puebla =

Federal electoral district of Mexico

Puebla's 7th
- Electoral district of the Chamber of Deputies of Mexico

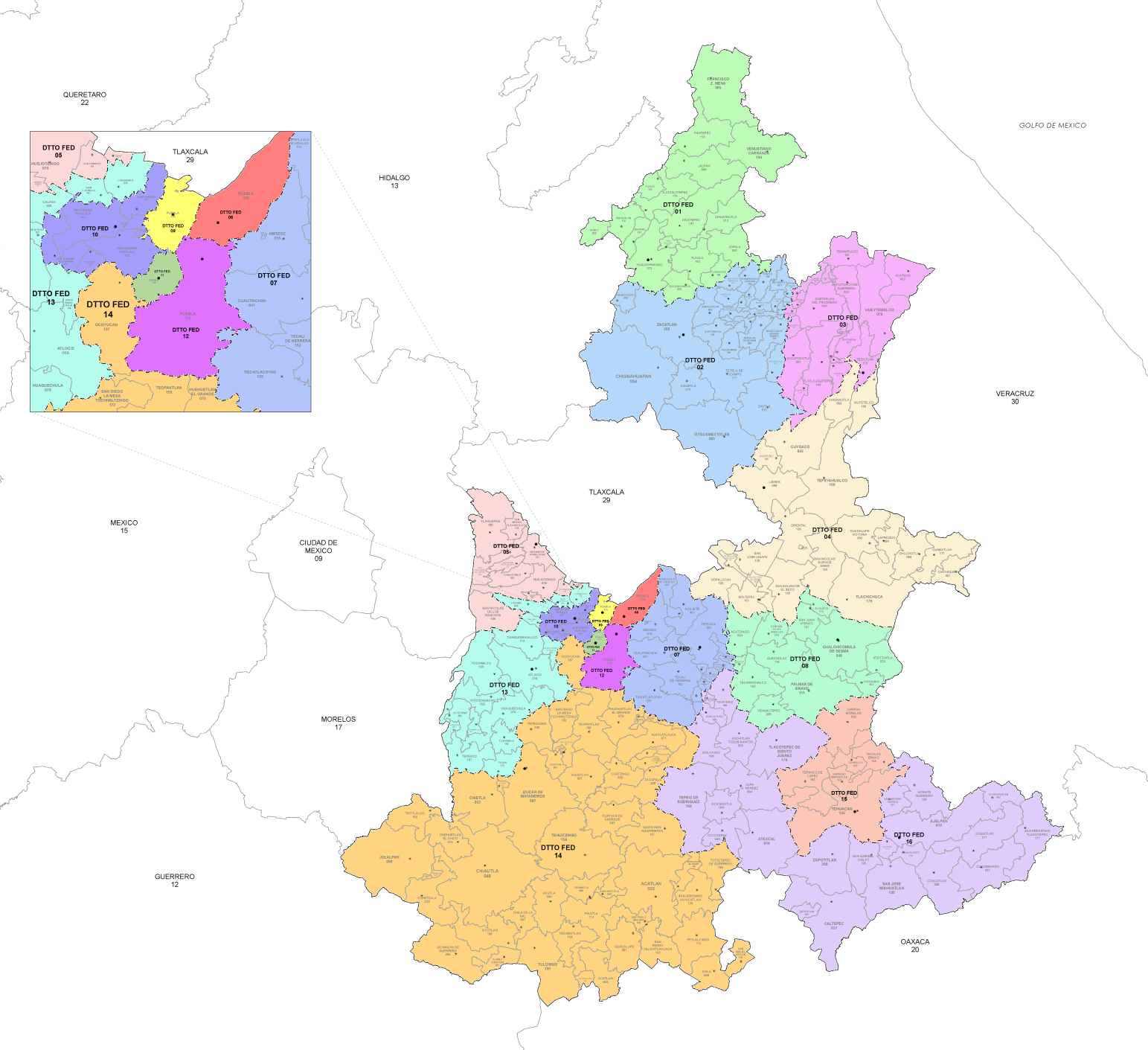
- 7th district since 2023

Incumbent
- Member: Claudia Rivera Vivanco
- Party: ▌Morena
- Congress: 66th (2024–2027)

District
- State: Puebla
- Head town: Tepeaca
- Coordinates: 18°58′N 97°54′W
- Covers: 14 municipalities: Acajete, Amozoc, Atoyatempan, Cuapiaxtla de Madero, Cuautinchán, Mixtla, Puebla (part), Los Reyes de Juárez, Santo Tomás Hueyotlipan, Tecali de Herrera, Tepatlaxco de Hidalgo, Tepeaca, Tlanepantla, Tzicatlacoyan
- PR region: Fourth
- Precincts: 110
- Population: 399,138 (2020 census)

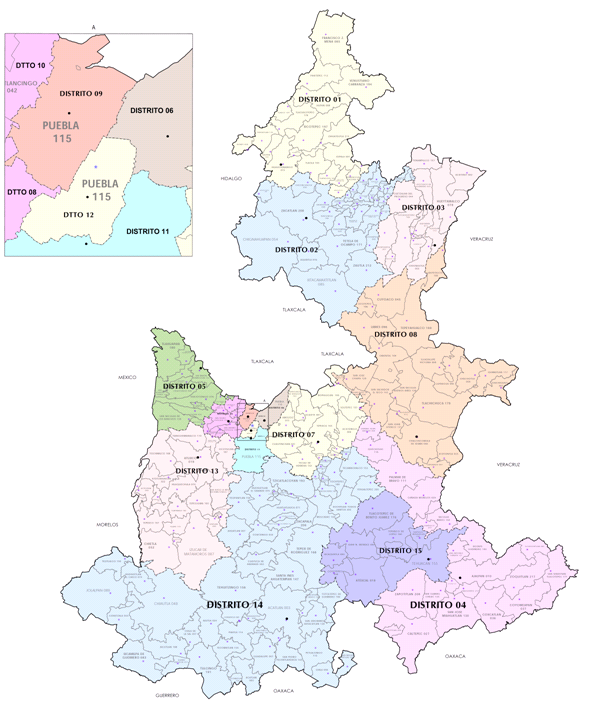
Puebla's districts in 2017–2022

The 7th federal electoral district of Puebla (Spanish: Distrito electoral federal 07 de Puebla) is one of the 300 electoral districts into which Mexico is divided for elections to the federal Chamber of Deputies and one of 16 such districts in the state of Puebla.

It elects one deputy to the lower house of Congress for each three-year legislative session by means of the first-past-the-post system. Votes cast in the district also count towards the calculation of proportional representation ("plurinominal") deputies elected from the fourth region.

The current member for the district, elected in the 2024 general election, is Claudia Rivera Vivanco of the National Regeneration Movement (Morena).

== District territory ==
Under the 2023 districting plan adopted by the National Electoral Institute (INE), which is to be used for the 2024, 2027 and 2030 federal elections, Puebla's congressional seat allocation rose from 15 to 16. The 7th district is in the central part of Puebla, to the east of the state capital, and covers 110 electoral precincts (secciones electorales) across 14 of the state's municipalities:

- Acajete, Amozoc, Atoyatempan, Cuapiaxtla de Madero, Cuautinchán, Mixtla, Puebla (one precinct), Los Reyes de Juárez, Santo Tomás Hueyotlipan, Tecali de Herrera, Tepatlaxco de Hidalgo, Tepeaca, Tlanepantla and Tzicatlacoyan.

The head town (cabecera distrital), where results from individual polling stations are gathered together and tallied, is the city of Tepeaca. The district reported a population of 399,138 in the 2020 census.

== Previous districting schemes ==
Evolution of electoral district numbers
	1974	1978	1996	2005	2017	2023
Puebla	10	14	15	16	15	16
Chamber of Deputies	196	300				

2017–2022

From 2017 to 2022, when Puebla was assigned 15 congressional seats, the district's head town was at Tepeaca and it covered 12 municipalities in their entirety, plus one precinct in the municipality of Puebla.

2005–2017

Under the 2005 plan, the district was one of 16 in Puebla. Its head town was at Tepeaca and it covered 13 municipalities in their entirety, plus one precinct in the municipality of Puebla.

1996–2005

Between 1996 and 2005, Puebla had 15 districts. The 7th covered 17 municipalities, with its head town at Tepeaca.

1978–1996

The districting scheme in force from 1978 to 1996 was the result of the 1977 electoral reforms, which increased the number of single-member seats in the Chamber of Deputies from 196 to 300. Under that plan, Puebla's seat allocation rose from 10 to 14. The 7th district's head town was at Chalchicomula and it comprised 21 municipalities.

== Deputies returned to Congress ==
(Mexico) National parties
- Current
- PAN
- PRI
- PT
- PVEM
- MC
- Morena
- PAZ
- Somos
- Defunct or local only
- PLM
- PNR
- PRM
- PNM
- PP
- PPS
- PARM
- PFCRN
- CON
- PANAL
- PSD
- PES
- PES
- PRD

Puebla's 7th district
Election	Deputy	Party	Term	Legislature
1916	Antonio de la Barrera		1916–1917	Constituent Congress of Querétaro
...
1973	Nefthalí López Páez	Institutional Revolutionary Party	1973–1976	49th Congress
1976	María Guadalupe López Bretón	Institutional Revolutionary Party	1976–1979	50th Congress
1979	Elizabeth Rodríguez de Casa	Institutional Revolutionary Party	1979–1982	51st Congress
1982	María Isabel Serdán Álvarez	Institutional Revolutionary Party	1982–1985	52nd Congress
1985	Melquíades Morales Flores	Institutional Revolutionary Party	1985–1988	53rd Congress
1988	Francisco Salas Hernández	Institutional Revolutionary Party	1988–1991	54th Congress
1991	Melquíades Morales Flores	Institutional Revolutionary Party	1991–1994	55th Congress
1994	Ángeles Marina Blanco Casco	Institutional Revolutionary Party	1994–1997	56th Congress
1997	Cupertino Alejo Domínguez	Institutional Revolutionary Party	1997–2000	57th Congress
2000	José Melitón Morales Sánchez	Institutional Revolutionary Party	2000–2003	58th Congress
2003	Jesús Morales Flores	Institutional Revolutionary Party	2003–2006	59th Congress
2006	José Luis Contreras Coeto	National Action Party (Mexico)	2006–2009	60th Congress
2009	José Alberto González Morales	Institutional Revolutionary Party	2009–2012	61st Congress
2012	Jesús Morales Flores	Institutional Revolutionary Party	2012–2015	62nd Congress
2015	Alejandro Armenta Mier (Note: Armenta Mier left the PRI benches on 28 April 2017 and, after 20 June 2017, sat with MORENA.)	Institutional Revolutionary Party National Regeneration Movement	2015–2018	63rd Congress
2018	Édgar Guzmán Valdez (Note: Guzmán Valdez switched allegiance from Morena to the PES on 24 October 2019.)	National Regeneration Movement Social Encounter Party	2018–2021	64th Congress
2021	Raymundo Atanacio Luna (Note: Atanacio Luna was originally elected for Morena but sat with the PT from April to September 2022 before returning to Morena.)	National Regeneration Movement Labour Party (Mexico)	2021–2024	65th Congress
2024	Claudia Rivera Vivanco	National Regeneration Movement	2024–2027	66th Congress

== Presidential elections ==
Puebla's 7th district
Election	District won by	Party or coalition	%
2018	Andrés Manuel López Obrador	Juntos Haremos Historia	61.9847
2024	Claudia Sheinbaum Pardo	Sigamos Haciendo Historia	72.1151
