= Alejandro Armenta =

Mexican politician (born 1969)

= Alejandro Armenta
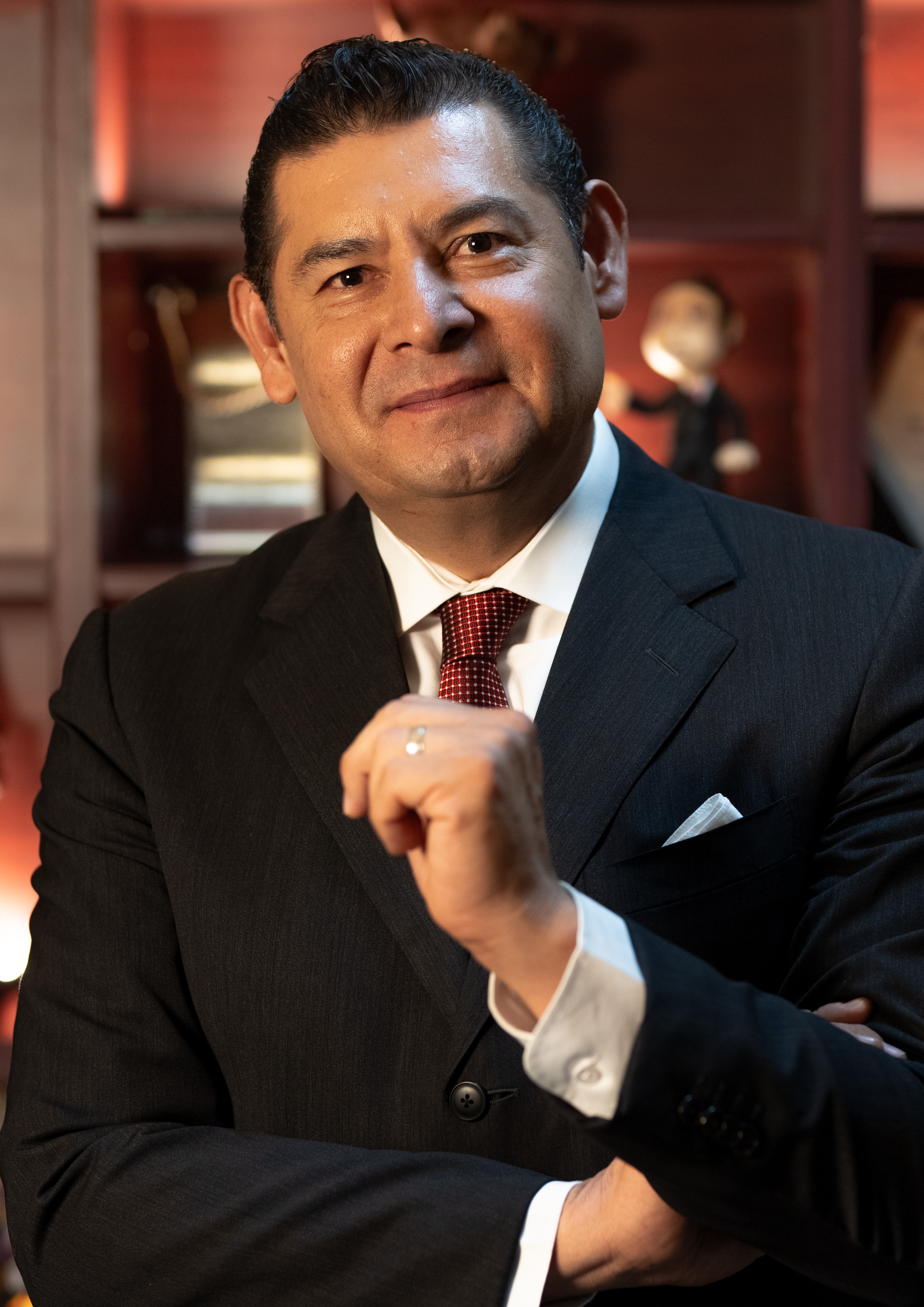
- Armenta in 2023

Governor of Puebla
- Incumbent
- Assumed office 14 December 2024
- Preceded by: Sergio Salomón Céspedes

President of the Senate of the Republic
- In office 1 September 2022 – 31 August 2023
- Preceded by: Olga Sánchez Cordero
- Succeeded by: Ana Lilia Rivera

Senator of the Republic
- In office 1 September 2018 – 1 March 2024
- Preceded by: María Izaguirre Francos
- Succeeded by: Jesús Encinas Meneses
- Constituency: Puebla
Other legislative positions
Member of the Chamber of Deputies
In office 1 September 2015 – 31 August 2018
Preceded by	Jesús Morales Flores
Succeeded by	Ricardo López Priego
Constituency	Puebla's 7th district
Member of the Congress of Puebla
In office 15 January 2002 – 14 January 2005
Preceded by	Óscar Emilio Carranza León
Succeeded by	Raymundo Atanacio Luna
Constituency	18th district

Personal details
- Born: Alejandro Armenta Mier; 9 July 1969 (age 57) Izúcar de Matamoros, Puebla, Mexico
- Party: MORENA (2017–present)
- Other political affiliations: Institutional Revolutionary Party (1985–2017)
- Occupation: Politician

Alejandro Armenta Mier (born 9 July 1969) is a Mexican politician. He originally belonged to the Institutional Revolutionary Party (PRI) but switched his allegiance to the National Regeneration Movement (Morena) in 2017. Since 14 December 2024, he is the governor of Puebla.

== Career ==
Armenta Mier was born in Izúcar de Matamoros, Puebla, in 1969. He served as municipal president of Acatzingo from 1993 to 1995 and as a local deputy in the 55th session of the Congress of Puebla from 2002 to 2005.

Armenta served as the state secretary of social development in the administration of Governor Mario Marín (2005–2011). In 2012 he was appointed the coordinator of Enrique Peña Nieto's presidential campaign in Puebla and, following Peña Nieto's victory in the 2012 general election, he served as the director of the National Population Register (Renapo).

In the 2015 mid-term federal election he won a seat in the Chamber of Deputies for the PRI, representing Puebla's 7th district (Tepeaca). On 28 April 2017, however, he resigned from the PRI's benches and, after 20 June 2017, sat with the National Regeneration Movement.

He was elected as a senator from the state of Puebla for Morena in the 2018 general election and served as the president of the Senate in 2022–2023.

Armenta Mier resigned his Senate seat on 1 March 2024 and ran for governor of Puebla in the 2 June 2024 election as the candidate of the Sigamos Haciendo Historia coalition. He won the election with over 59% of the vote and was sworn in on 14 December 2024.
