= Acajete =

Acajete may refer to:

== Places ==
- Acajete Municipality, Puebla, Mexico
  - Acajete, Puebla, the municipal capital of the above
- Acajete Municipality, Veracruz, Mexico
