= Julieta Vences Valencia =

Mexican politician

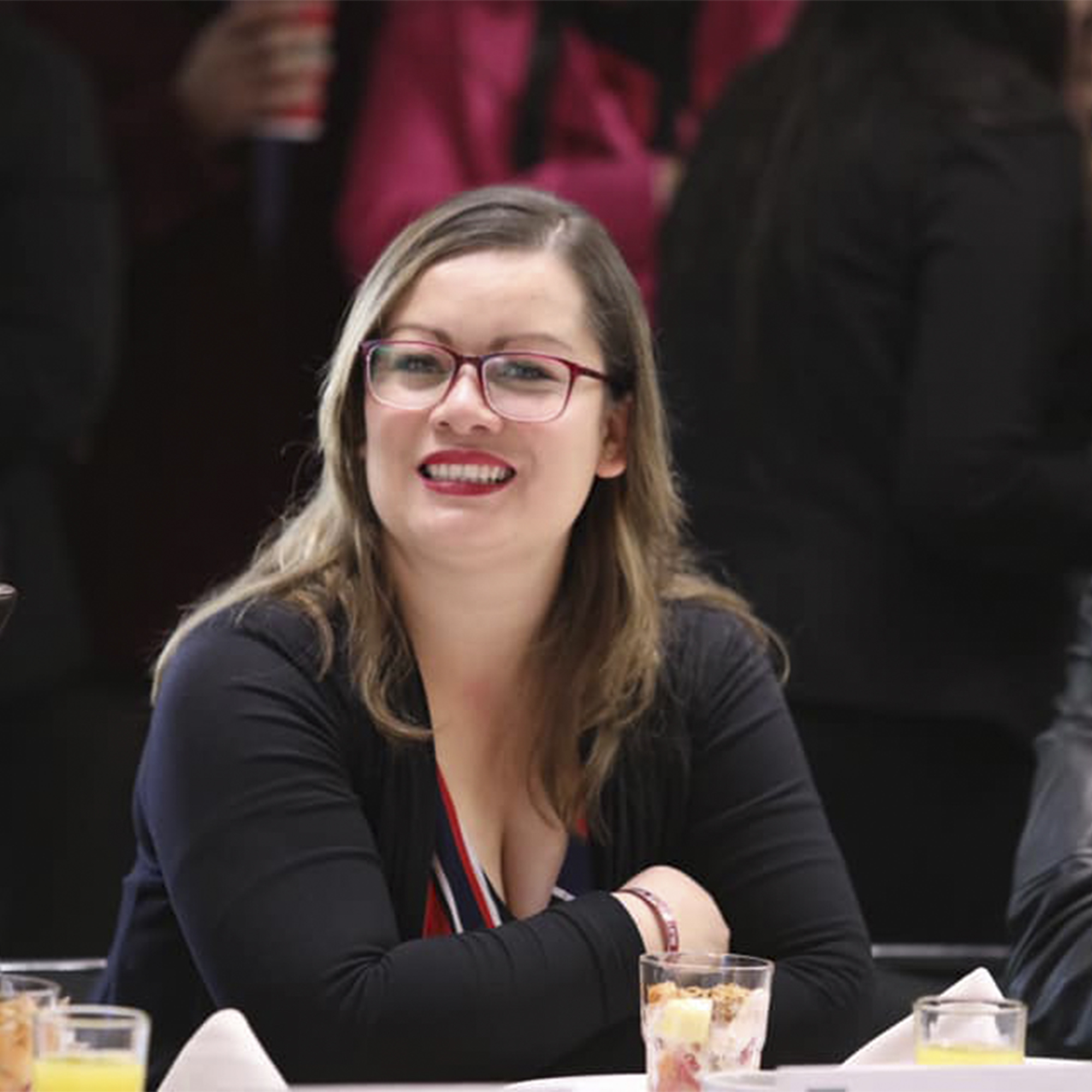
Julieta Vences Valencia

Julieta Vences Valencia (born 24 October 1986) is a Mexican politician affiliated with the National Regeneration Movement (Morena). From 2018 to 2021 she was a federal deputy in the Congress of the Union, representing Puebla's 8th district and, from 2021 to 2024, she sat in Congress as a plurinominal deputy.

== Early years ==
Vences Valencia was born in Mexico City on 24 October 1986. She obtained a law degree from the National Autonomous University of Mexico (UNAM) and a master's degree in constitutional law and amparo. She is married to Carlos Alberto Evangelista, coordinator of Morena in the State of Puebla since 2020.

== Political career ==
In 2015 she was state advisor of the National Regeneration Movement party and regional leader of the Central de Organizaciones Campesinas y Populares del Estado de Puebla.

In the 2018 elections, she was elected to the Chamber of Deputies for Puebla's 8th district (Chalchicomula de Sesma). She assumed office on 1 September 2018, in the 64th session of the Congress of the Union. Within Congress, she was the president of the immigration affairs commission. In the 2021 elections, she was elected as a plurinominal deputy for the 55th session of Congress.
