= Jesús Morales Flores =

Mexican politician

- Born: 19 July 1946 (age 80); Esperanza, Puebla, Mexico
- Education: BUAP
- Occupation: Politician
- Political party: PRI

Jesús Morales Flores (born 19 July 1946) is a Mexican politician affiliated with the Institutional Revolutionary Party (PRI).

He has been elected to two terms in the Chamber of Deputies for Puebla's 7th congressional district: in the 2003 mid-terms (59th Congress), and in the 2012 general election (62nd Congress).

Jesús Morales Flores is the brother of former governor of Puebla Melquíades Morales Flores.
