= Jaime Silva =

Jaime Silva may refer to:

- Jaime Silva (Portugal), Portugal government minister
- Jaime Silva (footballer) (1935–2003), Colombian footballer
- Jaime Alcántara Silva (born 1950), Mexican politician
