= José Luis Contreras Coeto =

Mexican politician

- Born: 30 March 1964 (age 62); Puebla, Puebla, Mexico
- Occupation: Politician
- Political party: PAN

José Luis Contreras Coeto (born 30 March 1964) is a Mexican politician affiliated with the National Action Party (PAN).

After serving as the municipal president of Tepeaca, Puebla, from 2002 to 2005, in the 2000 general election he was elected to the Chamber of Deputies to represent Puebla's 7th district during the 60th session of Congress.
