= José Alberto González Morales =

Mexican politician

- Born: 7 August 1953 (age 72); Tepeaca, Puebla, Mexico
- Occupation: Politician
- Political party: PRI

José Alberto González Morales (born 7 August 1953) is a Mexican politician from the Institutional Revolutionary Party (PRI). In the 2009 mid-terms he was elected to the Chamber of Deputies to represent Puebla's 7th district during the 61st session of Congress.
