= Aljojuca =

Aljojuca Municipality
- Municipality
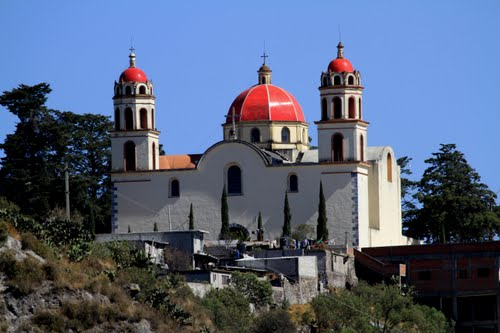

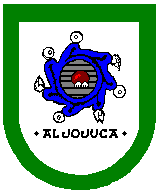
- Coat of arms

- Location in Mexico
- Coordinates: 19°06′N 97°31′W
- Country: Mexico
- State: Puebla
- Time zone: UTC-6 (Zona Centro)

Aljojuca is a municipality located in central eastern Puebla, Mexico.

It is bordered by the municipalities of San Juan Atenco to the south, Chalchicomula de Sesma (Cd. Serdan) to the southeast, Tlachichuca to the east, San Nicolas, Buenos Aires to the north, and San Salvador El Seco to the west. Nearby is the highest peak of Mexico, Citlaltepetl or Pico de Orizaba.

Located on the plains of San Andres, Aljojuca was founded in colonial times with its main purpose being the prime grazing lands around the small settlement. It quickly became the most established town between El Seco and San Andres Chalchicomula (now Serdan), providing employment to many of the region's Indigenous population. Currently the population numbers approximately 5000 and is distributed in the settlements of Aljojuca, San Miguel Tecuitlapa, and San Antonio Jalapasco. However the numbers continue to fall due to large-scale emigration, especially in recent years.

Local attractions include a 1 km-wide volcanic crater lake, known as the Laguna de Aljojuca, a 19th-century church, completed in 1906, a 17th-century church, and the ruins of the hacienda Cascantla.
