= José López Medina =

Mexican politician

Deputy of the Congress of the Union for the 8th district of Puebla
- In office 12 September 2004 – 31 August 2006
- Preceded by: Rafael Moreno Valle Rosas
- Succeeded by: Antonio Vasconcelos Rueda

Personal details
- Born: 29 October 1939 (age 86) Puebla, Mexico
- Party: PRI
- Occupation: Politician

José López Medina (born 29 October 1939) is a Mexican politician affiliated with the Institutional Revolutionary Party (PRI). In 2004–2006, he served in the Chamber of Deputies during the 59th session of Congress representing Puebla's 8th district as the alternate of Rafael Moreno Valle Rosas.
