= Isabel Allende Cano =

Mexican politician

Ana Isabel Allende Cano
- Born: 29 June 1983 (age 42); Ciudad Serdán, Puebla, México
- Occupation: Politician
- Political party: PRI

Ana Isabel Allende Cano (born 29 June 1963) is a Mexican politician affiliated with the Institutional Revolutionary Party (PRI). In the 2012 general election she was elected to the Chamber of Deputies to represent Puebla's 8th district during the 62nd session of Congress.
