= Mexican Railway =

Former railroad company in Mexico

- Ferrocarril México–Veracruz
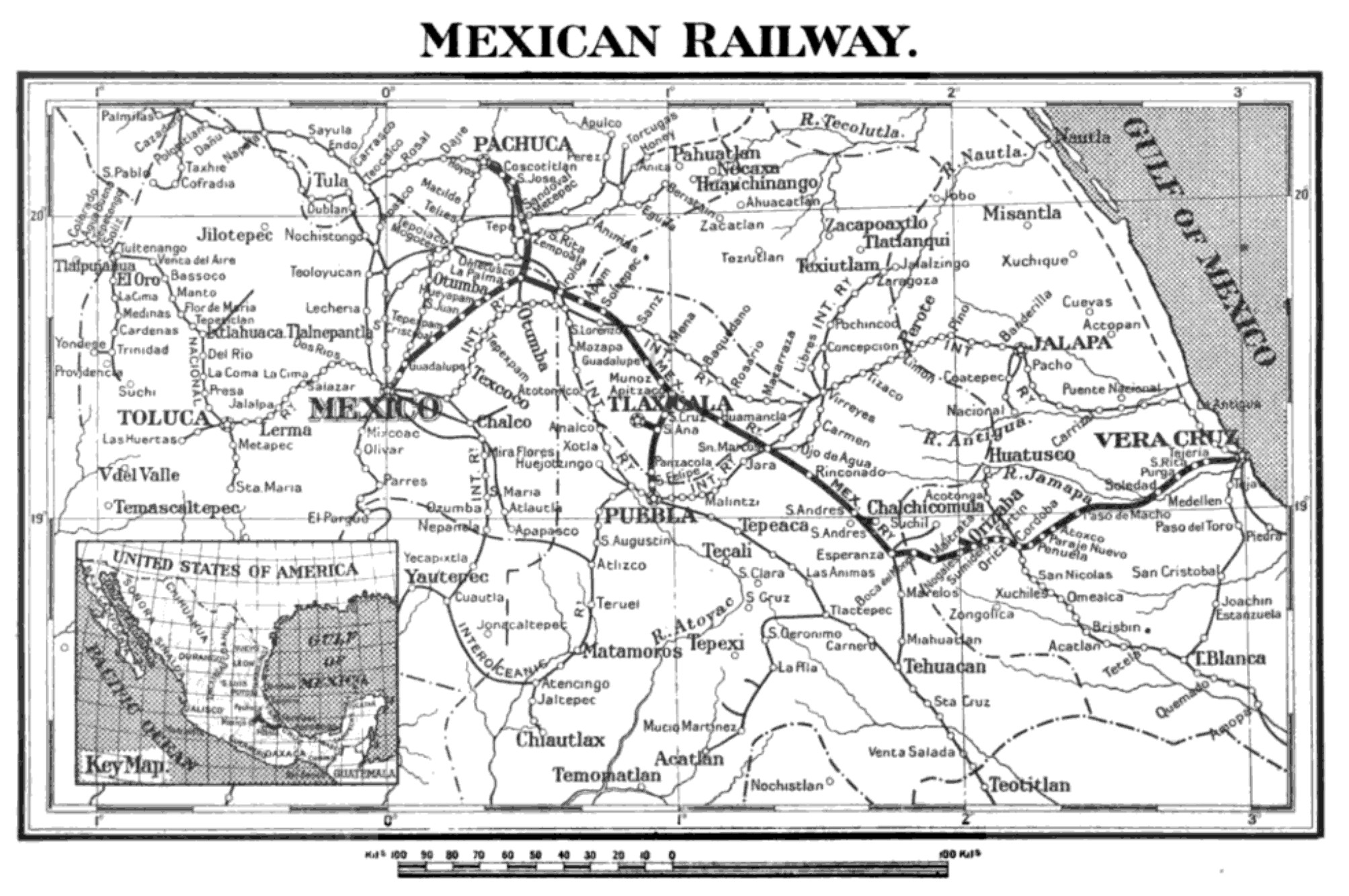
- Map of the Mexican Railway network in 1912

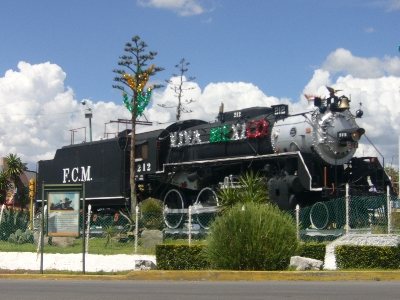
- A Mexican Railway No. 212 on display at the La Maquinita roundabout in Apizaco, January 17, 2008.

Overview
- Reporting mark: FCM
- Locale: Southeastern Mexico
- Dates of operation: 1867–1959
- Predecessor: Imperial Mexican Railway
- Successor: Ferrocarriles Nacionales de México

Technical
- Track gauge: 4 ft 8 1/2 in (1,435 mm) standard gauge
- Electrification: Partially, 103 km (64 mi), between Esperanza and Paso del Macho
- Length: 679.8 kilometres (422.4 mi)
- No. of tracks: 1

The Mexican Railway (Ferrocarril Mexicano) (reporting mark FCM) was one of the primary pre-nationalization railways of Mexico. Incorporated in London in September 1864 as the Imperial Mexican Railway (Ferrocarril Imperial Mexicano) to complete an earlier project, it was renamed in July 1867 after the Second French Empire withdrew from Mexico.

== History ==
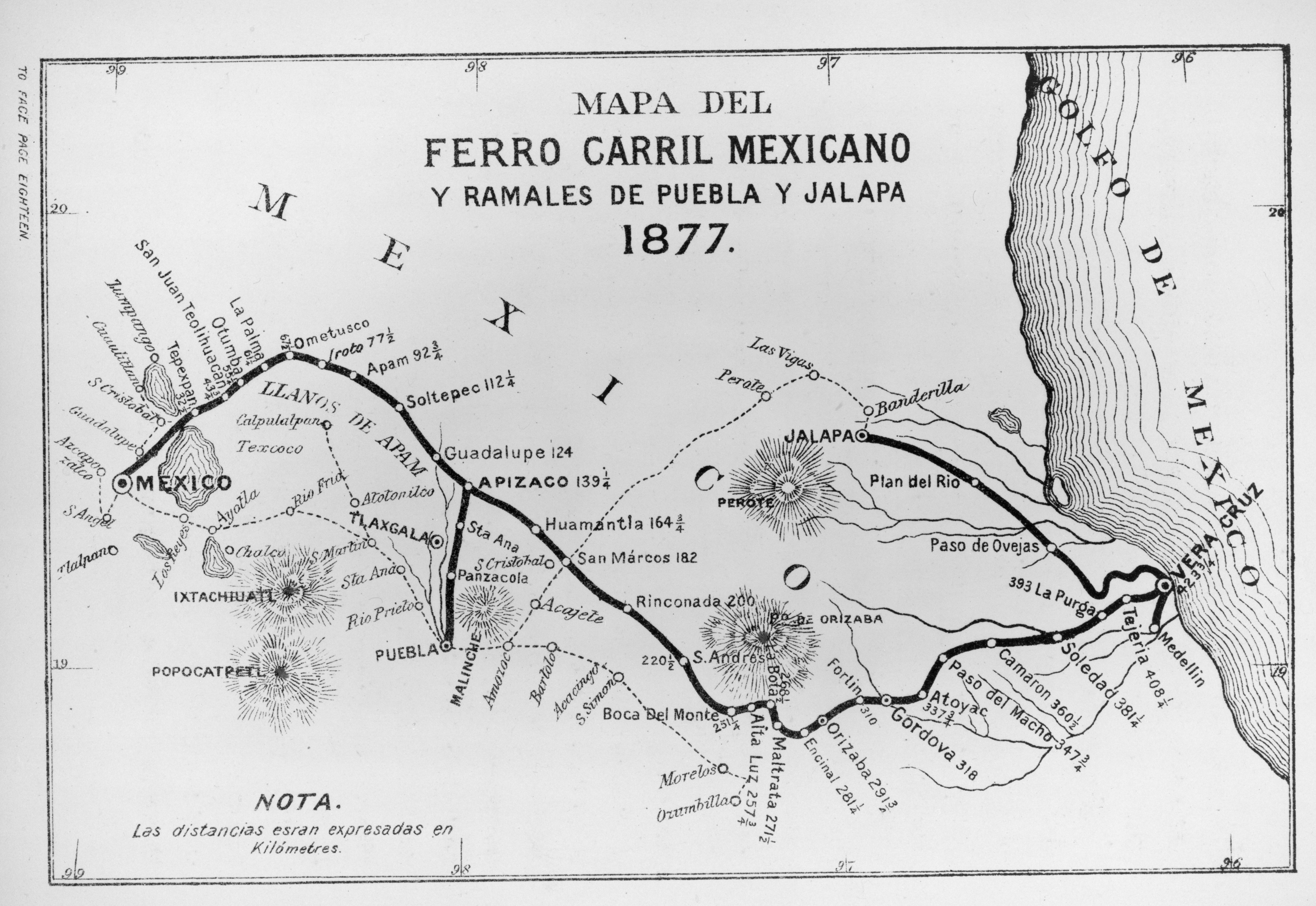
1877 map of the Mexican Railway

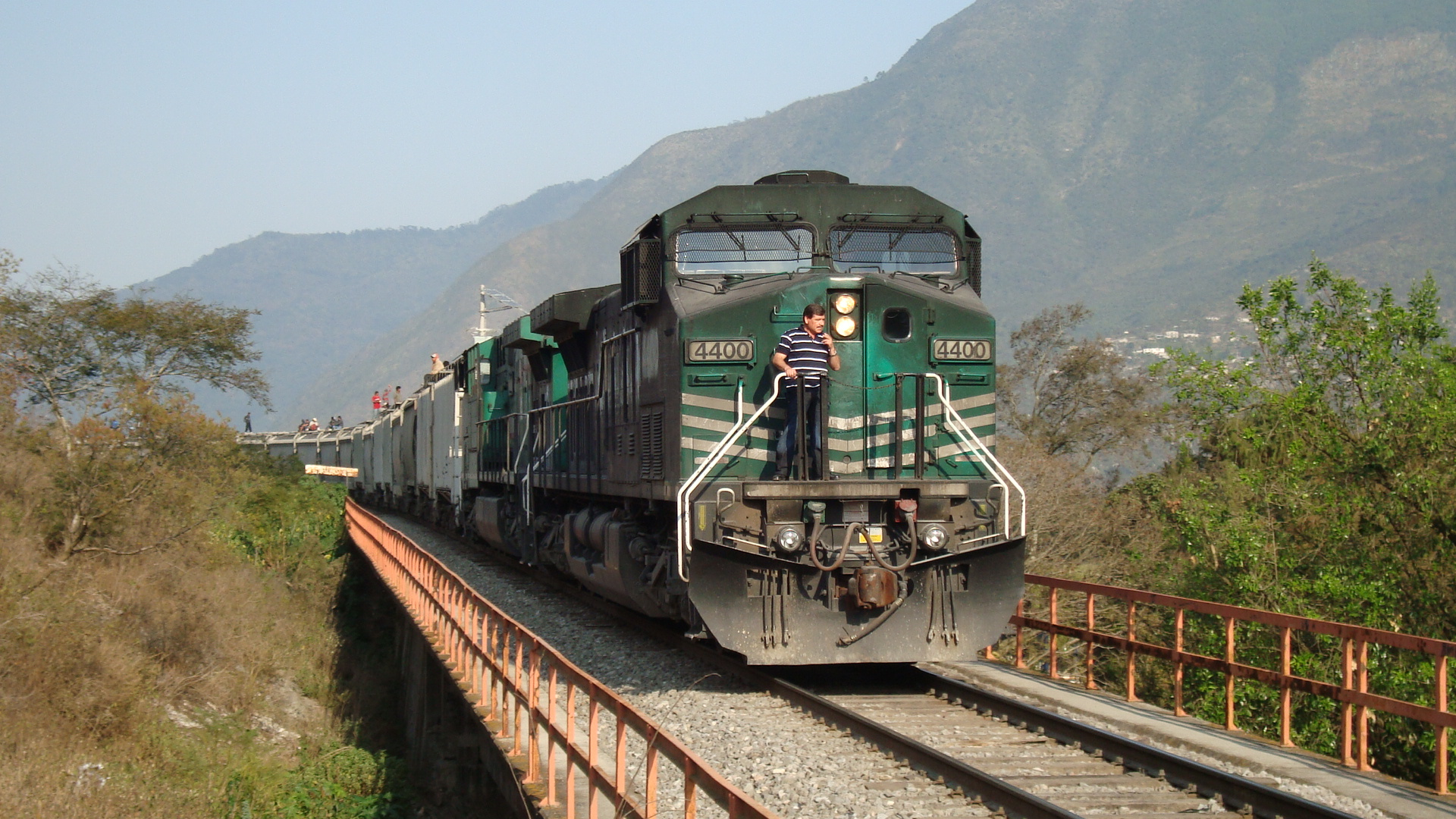
A Ferrosur train in Veracruz, which is currently used on their former lines of Mexican Railway

The main line from Mexico City to Veracruz was dedicated on January 1, 1873, by President Sebastián Lerdo de Tejada; branches connected Ometusco to Pachuca and Apizaco to Puebla. The 103 kilometers (64 mi) between Esperanza and Paso del Macho were electrically operated beginning in the 1920s.

The Mexican Railway remained independent of the government-owned Ferrocarriles Nacionales de México (National Railways of Mexico) until the government gained control in June 1946 and merged the property in March 1959. Following privatization in the 1990s, Ferrosur acquired the lines of the former Mexican Railway.

== Passenger services ==
Although the Mexico City–Veracruz line, formerly the Mexican Railway, is currently a freight rail line, it has historically been used for passenger service as well.

=== The Jarocho ===
Many passenger trains of the Ferrocarriles Nacionales de México were named after the city they connected Mexico City's Buenavista station with. Therefore, the Jarocho (a Spanish word meaning a person from Veracruz) was the name given to the train that went from Mexico City to the Port of Veracruz via the former Mexican Railway. The Jarocho operated as part of the N de M until 18 August 1999.

=== Proposed revival ===
In 2017, the National Tourism Business Council announced that the route will join a group of tourist train routes known as the Ruta de Cortés (Cortés Route). There are plans to use $100 million to improve and maintain the pre-existing railroad infrastructure for the Ruta de Cortés.

On November 20, 2023, the government of Andrés Manuel López Obrador announced a decree to reactivate seven passenger train routes, including a route from Mexico City to Veracruz and Coatzacoalcos.

On January 25, 2024, it was announced that the company Construcciones y Auxiliar de Ferrocarriles, together with Grupo México and Canadian Pacific Kansas City, would carry out the analysis of the development of four passenger train routes in Mexico, including the Mexico City–Veracruz line.
