= List of sister cities in Colorado =

Monument in Pueblo dedicated to its sister city of Chihuahua

This is a list of sister cities of cities and towns in the United States state of Colorado. Sister cities, known in Europe as twin towns, are cities which partner with each other to promote human contact and cultural links, although this partnering is not limited to cities and often includes counties, regions, states and other sub-national entities.

Many Colorado jurisdictions work with foreign cities through Sister Cities International, an organization whose goal is to "promote peace through mutual respect, understanding, and cooperation."

== A ==
Arvada

- Jinzhou, China
- Kyzylorda, Kazakhstan

Aspen

- Abetone Cutigliano, Italy
- Bariloche, Argentina
- Chamonix-Mont-Blanc, France
- Davos, Switzerland
- Garmisch-Partenkirchen, Germany
- Queenstown-Lakes, New Zealand
- Shimukappu, Japan

Aurora

- Adama, Ethiopia
- Chihuahua, Mexico
- Jacó, Costa Rica
- Seongnam, South Korea

== B ==
Beaver Creek

- Lech, Austria

Boulder

- Dushanbe, Tajikistan
- Jalapa, Nicaragua
- Kathmandu, Nepal
- Kisumu, Kenya
- Lhasa, China
- El Mante, Mexico
- Nablus, Palestine
- Ramat HaNegev, Israel
- Yamagata, Japan
- Yateras, Cuba

Brighton

- Ziębice, Poland

Broomfield

- Lalitpur, Nepal
- Ueda, Japan

== C ==
Cañon City

- Chalchicomula de Sesma, Mexico
- Kahoku, Japan
- Valday, Russia

Colorado Springs

- Canterbury-Bankstown, Australia
- Bishkek, Kyrgyzstan
- Fujiyoshida, Japan
- Kaohsiung, Taiwan
- Kranj, Slovenia
- Nuevo Casas Grandes, Mexico
- Olympia, Greece

Commerce City

- Nanning, China

== D ==
Denver

- Axum, Ethiopia
- Brest, France
- Chennai, India
- Cuernavaca, Mexico
- Karmiel, Israel
- Kunming, China
- Nairobi, Kenya
- Potenza, Italy
- Takayama, Japan
- Ulaanbaatar, Mongolia

Durango

- Chyamtang, Nepal
- Durango, Spain
- Victoria de Durango, Mexico

== E ==
Estes Park

- Monteverde, Costa Rica

Evans

- Ashby-de-la-Zouch, England, United Kingdom

== F ==
Fort Collins

- Alcalá de Henares, Spain

== G ==
Grand Junction

- El Espino (Jucuarán), El Salvador

Greeley

- Moriya, Japan

Gunnison

- Majkhali, India

== L ==
Lakewood

- Sutherland, Australia

Lamar

- Pilsting, Germany

Littleton

- Bega Valley, Australia

Longmont

- Chino, Japan
- Wind River Indian Reservation, United States
- Zapotlán el Grande, Mexico

== M ==
Mancos

- Feins, France

== P ==
Pueblo

- Bergamo, Italy
- Chihuahua, Mexico
- Lucca Sicula, Italy
- Maribor, Slovenia
- Puebla, Mexico
- Weifang, China

== S ==
Steamboat Springs

- Saas-Fee, Switzerland
- San Martín de los Andes, Argentina

== V ==
Vail

- St. Moritz, Switzerland
