= Acajete Municipality =

Acajete Municipality may refer to:

- Acajete Municipality, Puebla, Mexico
- Acajete Municipality, Veracruz, Mexico
