= Fernando Morales Martínez =

Mexican politician

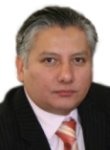
- Born: 20 August 1969 (age 56); Puebla, Puebla, Mexico
- Occupation: Politician
- Political party: Movimiento Ciudadano
- Other political affiliations: PRI (pre-2017)
- Relatives: Melquíades Morales Flores (father)

Fernando Morales Martínez (Note: In this Mexican name, the surname is Morales and the second or maternal family name is Martínez.) (born 20 August 1969) is a Mexican politician. Previously affiliated with the Institutional Revolutionary Party (PRI), he switched to the Citizens' Movement (MC) party in 2017 when he was threatened with expulsion.

In the 2009 mid-terms he was elected to the Chamber of Deputies to represent the 8th district of Puebla for the PRI during the 61st Congress (2009 to 2012).

Running on the MC ticket, Morales Martínez contended unsuccessfully for the governorship of Puebla in the 2 June 2024 election.

He is the son of Melquíades Morales Flores, who was governor of Puebla from 1999 to 2005.
