= Claudia Rivera Vivanco =

Mexican politician (born 1983)

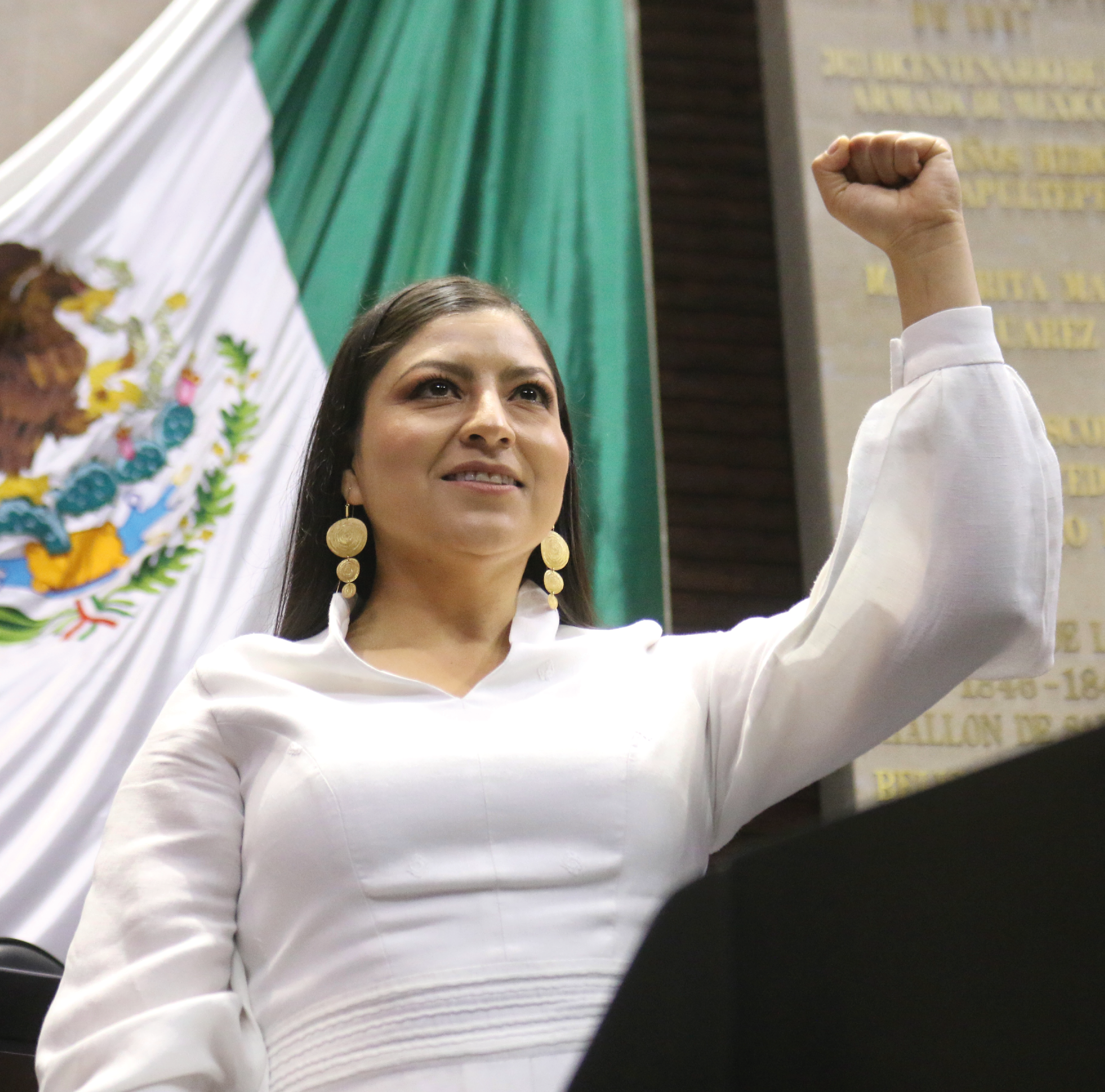
- Rivera in 2024

Member of the Chamber of Deputies
- Incumbent
- Assumed office 1 September 2024
- Preceded by: Raymundo Atanacio Luna
- Constituency: Puebla's 7th

Personal details
- Born: 27 November 1983 (age 42) Puebla, Puebla, Mexico
- Party: Morena (since 2014)

Claudia Rivera Vivanco (born 27 November 1983) is a Mexican politician from the National Regeneration Movement (Morena). In the 2024 general election, she was elected to the Chamber of Deputies for Puebla's 7th district. From 2018 to 2021, she served as the mayor of her home town, the city of Puebla.
