= María Leticia Jasso =

Mexican politician (born 1948)

- Born: María del Rosario Leticia Jasso Valencia; 19 October 1948 (age 77); Puebla, Mexico
- Occupation: Senator
- Political party: PAN

María del Rosario Leticia Jasso Valencia (born 19 October 1948) is a Mexican politician affiliated with the National Action Party (previously to the Institutional Revolutionary Party and later to the New Alliance Party). She served as Senator of the LXI Legislature of the Mexican Congress representing Puebla as replacement of Rafael Moreno Valle Rosas. She previously served in the LVI Legislature of the Congress of Puebla.
