= Olga Sánchez Cordero =

Mexican politician and lawyer

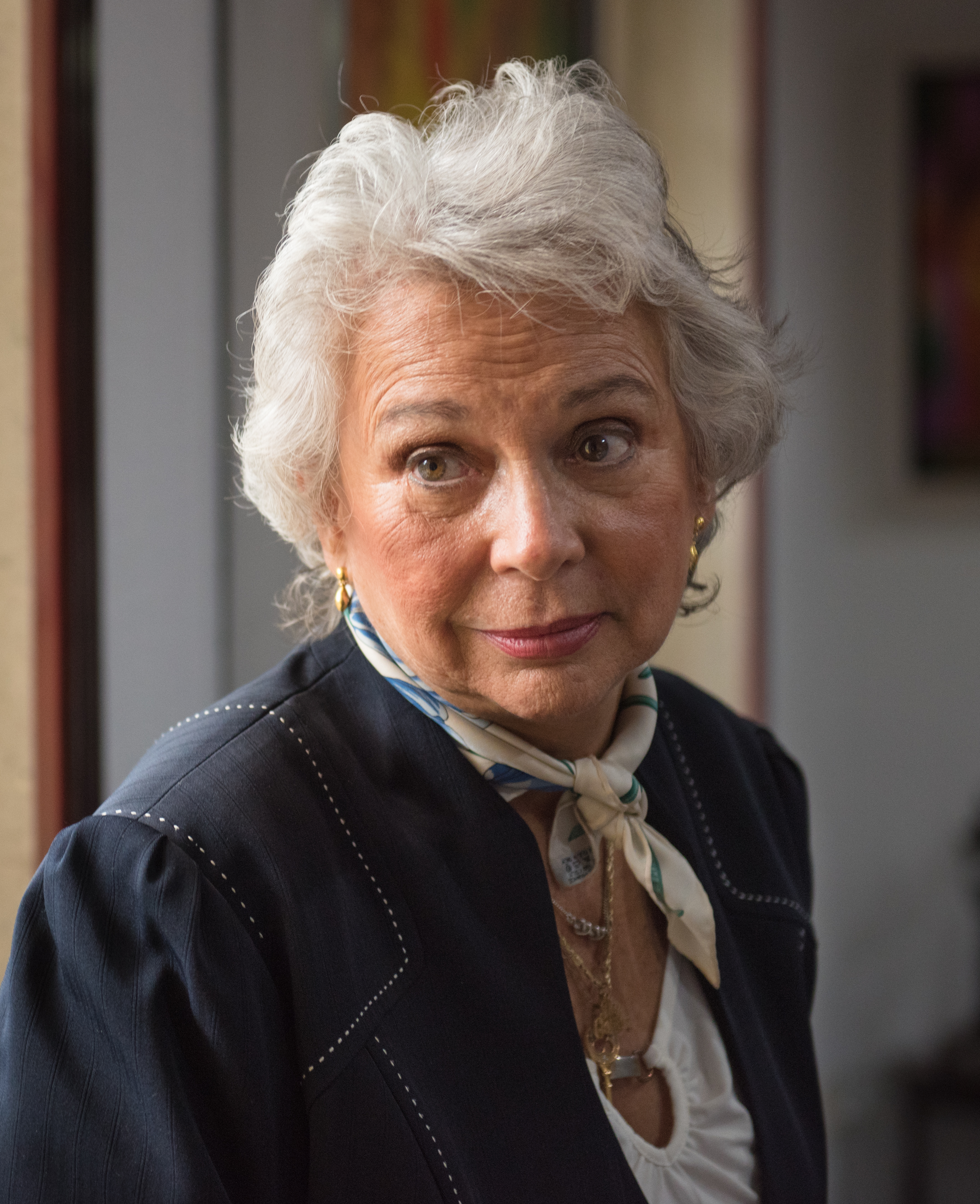
- Sánchez Cordero in 2018

Member of the Chamber of Deputies Proportional representation
- Incumbent
- Assumed office 1 September 2024

President of the Senate
- In office 1 September 2021 – 31 August 2022
- Preceded by: Eduardo Ramírez Aguilar
- Succeeded by: Alejandro Armenta Mier

Secretary of the Interior of Mexico
- In office 1 December 2018 – 26 August 2021
- President: Andrés Manuel López Obrador
- Preceded by: Alfonso Navarrete Prida
- Succeeded by: Adán Augusto López

Senator of Mexico Proportional representation
- In office 26 August 2021 – 31 August 2024
- Preceded by: Jesusa Rodríguez
- In office 1 September 2018 – 29 November 2018
- Succeeded by: Jesusa Rodríguez

Associate Justice of the Supreme Court of Justice of the Nation
- In office 26 January 1995 – 30 November 2015
- Appointed by: Ernesto Zedillo
- Preceded by: Seat established
- Succeeded by: Norma Lucía Piña Hernández

Personal details
- Born: Olga María del Carmen Sánchez Cordero Dávila; 16 July 1947 (age 78) Mexico City, Mexico
- Political party: National Regeneration Movement
- Spouse: Eduardo García Villegas
- Children: 3
- Education: National Autonomous University of Mexico (LLB)

Olga María del Carmen Sánchez Cordero Dávila (born 16 July 1947) is a Mexican politician and former jurist. She served as Secretary of the Interior under President Andrés Manuel López Obrador from 2018 to 2021, the first woman to serve in the position.

From 1995 to 2015, she was an Associate Justice on the Supreme Court of Justice, Mexico's highest federal court. A member of Morena, she has been elected to both the Senate and the Chamber of Deputies.

== Early life and education ==
Sánchez Cordero was born in Mexico City on 16 July 1947. She studied law at the National Autonomous University of Mexico (UNAM). While at UNAM, she was a participant in the in 1968 student protests.

She later received judicial training at the Autonomous University of Nuevo León, the Autonomous University of Morelos, as well as the University College of Swansea in Swansea, Wales, United Kingdom. Sánchez Cordero was the first female notary public in Mexico City.

== Judicial career ==
After graduating from law school, she later became secretary of school affairs at the UNAM Faculty of Law, serving from 1976 to 1978. From 1980 to 1984, she was director of the seminar of general and legal sociology at UNAM. Sánchez Cordero served on the Supreme Court Justice of the Federal District (Mexico City) from 1993 to 1995.

=== Supreme Court of Justice ===
She was appointed Minister (Associate Justice) of the Supreme Court of Justice of the Nation (SCJN) by President Ernesto Zedillo. Her nomination was confirmed by the Senate on 26 January 1995. Her appointment made her the ninth woman to hold a seat on the SCJN. She left the position on 30 November 2015.

== López Obrador administration and Senate ==
In December 2017, Andrés Manuel López Obrador (then a 2018 presidential candidate) released his proposed list of Cabinet appointments, with Sánchez Cordero as his choice for Secretary of the Interior. She was chosen by Morena to serve on its national list for the 2018 Senate election, and took office on 1 September 2018 as part of the 64th session of Congress.

She resigned from the Senate on 29 November 2018 and took office as Secretary of the Interior on 1 December 2018. Her appointment made her the first woman to serve in the position. Sánchez Cordero resigned as Secretary of the Interior in 2021 and was succeeded by Adán Augusto López, the Governor of Tabasco.

She returned to the Senate on 26 August 2021 to support the López Obrador administration's legislative agenda. Sánchez Cordero was elected President of the Senate, and served in the position until 30 August 2022, when she was succeeded by Alejandro Armenta Mier.

Sánchez Cordero declined to run for president in the 2024 election. She advised Claudia Sheinbaum during her candidacy for Morena's presidential nomination. She indicated in an interview that she did not intend to join Sheinbaum's cabinet if elected.

In the 2024 election, she was elected to the Chamber of Deputies as a plurinominal deputy for the 2024–27 term.

== Political views ==
Sánchez Cordero is a self-described feminist. She is a supporter of efforts to decriminalize abortion throughout the country. The Economist describes her as a "social liberal" and "European-style social democrat." Sánchez Cordero is a supporter of same-sex marriage.

She has argued that the criminalization of marijuana has contributed to violence and deprivation, and supports decriminalization efforts. In 2024, she advocated for a state-backed social program to assist women looking to enter the workforce.

== Personal life and recognition ==
Sánchez Cordero is married to Eduardo García Villegas and has three children. She and her husband own an apartment in Houston, Texas, United States. She reported income of MXN $10,688,288 in 2019, including her salary of MXN $1,914,432 plus investments. In 2013, she ranked first on Forbes Mexico's list of the fifty most powerful women in the country.
