= San Salvador Huixcolotla =

- Municipality and town
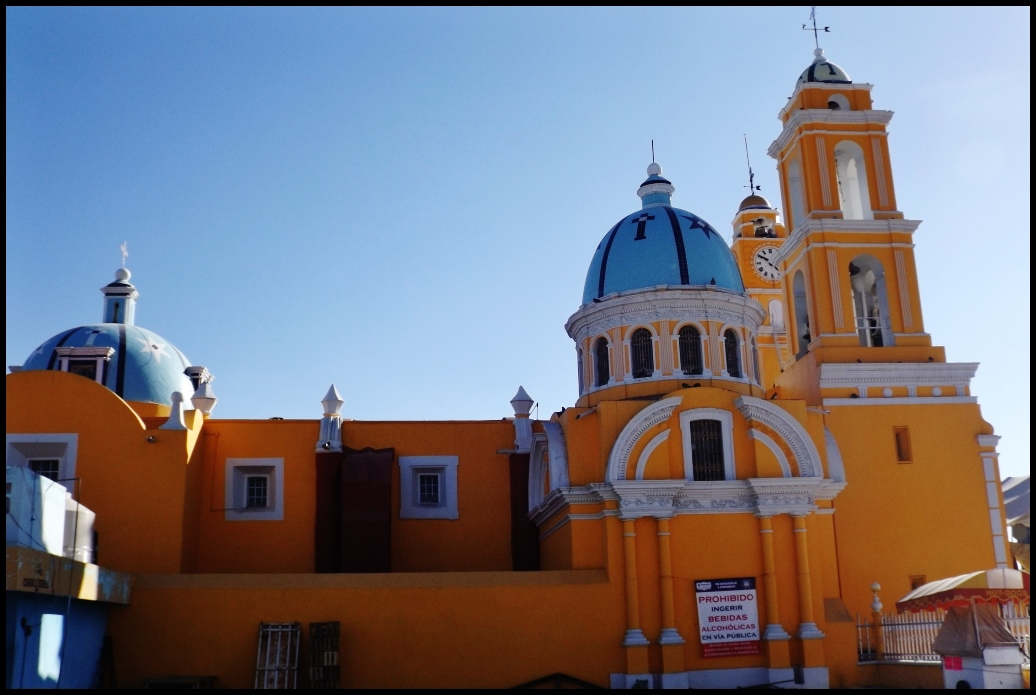
- Parroquia del Divino Salvador (Church of the Divine Savior) in the center of San Salvador Huixcolotla

- Location of Puebla State in Mexico

- Location within Puebla State
- Coordinates: 18°54′53″N 97°46′25″W
- Country: Mexico
- State: Puebla

Government
  - Presidente: C. Silvano Teodoro Mauricio (2018-2021)

Area
  - Total: 23.909 km^{2} (9.231 sq mi)
- Elevation: 2,040 m (6,690 ft)

Population (2010)
  - Total: 12,148
- Time zone: UTC-6 (Zona Centro)
- Website: www.huixcolotla.gob.mx

San Salvador Huixcolotla is a town and municipality in the Mexican state of Puebla that may be best known as the birthplace of papel picado. San Salvador is of Spanish origin and translates to "Holy Savior" and Huixcolotla is Nahuatl for "place of the curved spines".

== History ==
The original inhabitants were Popoloca speakers, under the Aztec Triple Alliance. Friar Juan de Rivas founded a small congregation in 1539 as part of the Spanish colonization and in 1750, construction began on Iglesia del Divino Salvador (Church of the Divine Savior). In 1779 it became a town, and on 15 April 1930, it was declared a municipality under the governorship of Leonides Andrew Almazán.

== Geography ==
The total area of San Salvador Huixcolotla is 23.909 square kilometres (9.231 sq mi), of which 79% is devoted to agriculture and the remaining is 21% developed. The four barrios are El Calvario, San Antonio, San Martín, and La Candelaria, and the three colonias are San Isidro, Dolores, and Benito Juárez. It is surrounded to the north by the municipalities of Los Reyes de Juárez and Acatzingo; to the east by Acatzingo and Tecamachalco; to the south by Tecamachalco, Tochtepec, and Cuapiaxtla de Madero; and to the west by Cuapiaxtla de Madero and Los Reyes de Juárez.

=== Climate ===
The typical range of temperatures is 12–18 °C (54–64 °F). Typical annual rainfall is 1,100–1,300 millimetres (43–51 in).

== Demographics ==
78.12% of the population lives in poverty. As of 2015, electricity and sanitary systems are universal, but only 50.10% of households have piped water inside their homes. 90.25% of the population between age 6 and 14 can read and write.

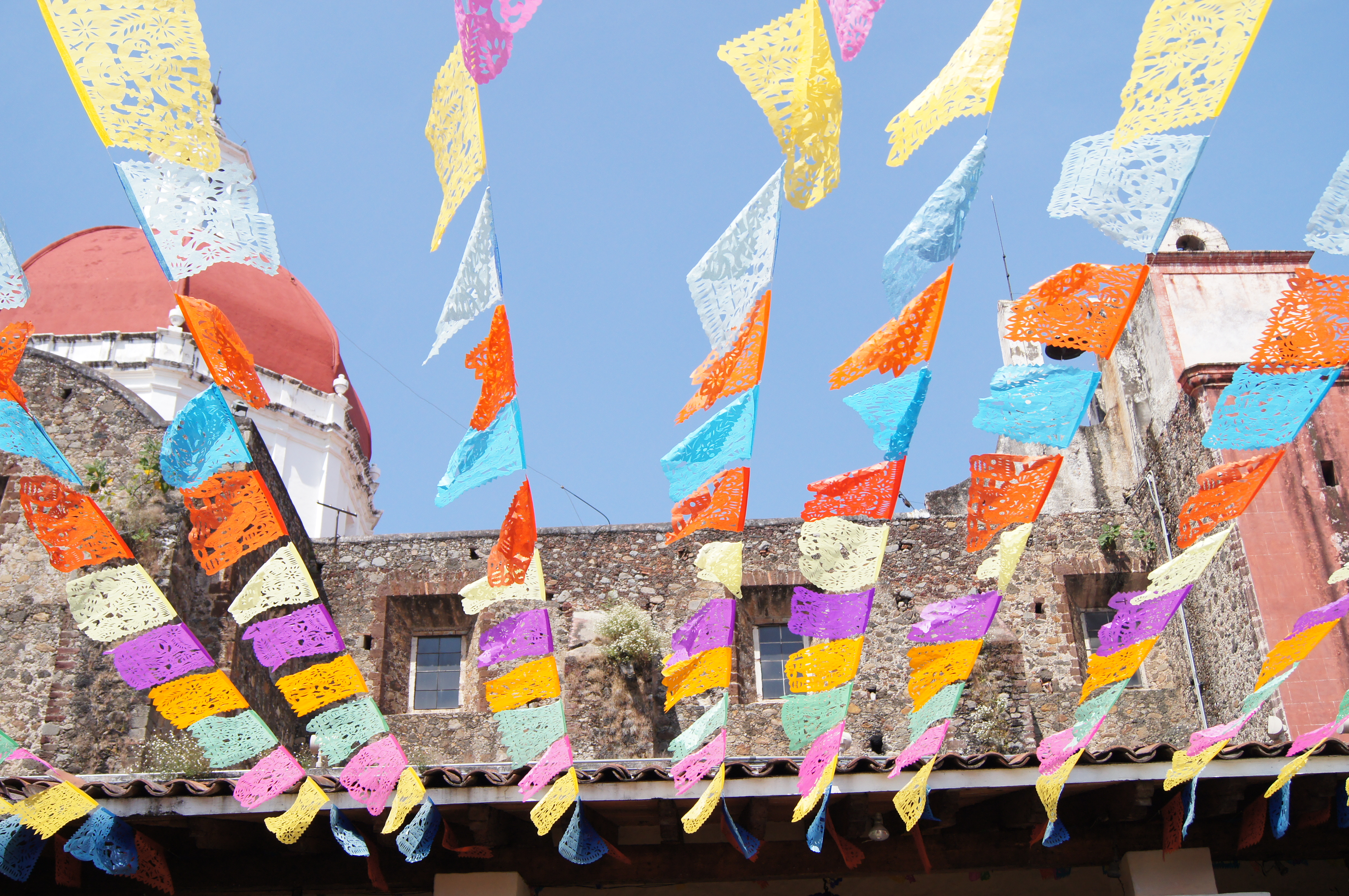
Papel Picado (not from San Salvador Huixcolotla)

== Papel picado ==
Papel Picado ("perforated paper," "pecked paper") is a decorative Mexican folk art made by cutting elaborate designs into sheets of tissue paper that were popularized in San Salvador Huixcolotla. It is thought to have originated from the pre-Hispanic practice of making religious offerings with amate bark paper. Among the first makers were Juan Hernandez, Cristóbal Flores, Santiago Vivanco R., and Lauro Pérez Macías. By the late 1920s, it had spread outside Puebla to Tlaxcala and is now used around the world in observations of Día de Muertos (Day of the Dead). In addition to Día de Muertos, known locally as Todos Santos, papel picado is also commonly made to celebrate Semana Santa (the Holy Week of Easter), Mexican independence, and Christmas.

In 1998 the governor of Puebla declared the town, in which 35% of the residents participate in this craft, a cultural heritage of the state. Papel Picado from Huixcolotla is exported around the world via the Museo Nacional de Arte.

== Other culture ==
An annual fair celebrates the town's patron of San Salvador and runs from 6–14 August. A typical dish is the eponymous mole poblana of the region.
