= Melquíades Morales =

Mexican lawyer and politician

Melquiades Morales
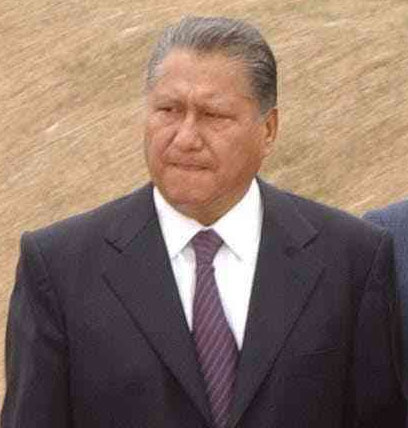

Governor of Puebla
- In office 1 February 1999 – 31 January 2005
- Preceded by: Manuel Bartlett
- Succeeded by: Mario Plutarco Marín

Senator for Puebla
- In office 1 September 2006 – 31 August 2012
- Preceded by: Francisco Fraile
- Succeeded by: Javier Lozano Alarcón
- In office 1 November 1994 – 5 August 1998
- Preceded by: Blas Chumacero
- Succeeded by: Jorge Rodolfo Budib Lichtle

Member of the Chamber of Deputies for Puebla's 7th district
- In office 1 November 1991 – 31 October 1994
- Preceded by: Francisco Salas Hernández
- Succeeded by: María de los Ángeles Blanco
- In office 1 September 1985 – 31 August 1988
- Preceded by: María Isabel Serdán Álvarez
- Succeeded by: Francisco Salas Hernández

Member of the Chamber of Deputies for Puebla's 14th district
- In office 1 September 1979 – 31 August 1982
- Succeeded by: Sacramento Joffre Vázquez

Personal details
- Born: 22 June 1942 (age 83); Esperanza, Puebla
- Political party: PRI
- Spouse: María del Socorro Alfaro
- Profession: lawyer, politician

Melquíades Morales Flores (born 22 June 1942) is a Mexican lawyer and politician, affiliated with the Partido Revolucionario Institucional (PRI). Between 1999 and 2005 he served as governor of the state of Puebla.

Born in the small town of Esperanza, Puebla, Morales studied law at the Autonomous University of Puebla (BUAP), where he also later taught. He has held various positions within the PRI's party structure, including a time as leader of the party in both the city of Puebla, Puebla, and in the state. In 1984 he served as Puebla's Secretary of the Interior, and has represented Puebla in both the Chamber of Deputies and the Senate. In 1998 he requested a leave of absence from his senatorial seat in order to seek the Puebla governorship.

In 2006 Melquíades Morales went back to the political spotlight, running for the second time trying to get a seat in the Senate, representing the state of Puebla, headlining the Partido Revolucionario Institucional (PRI) / Alianza por México nomination alongside Mario Alberto Montero Serrano.

His son Fernando Morales Martínez is also a politician.

Preceded by Manuel Bartlett	Governor of Puebla; 1999-2005	Succeeded by Mario Plutarco Marín
