= Mixtla =

Coordinates: 18.9972°N 97.8145°W

- Municipality and town
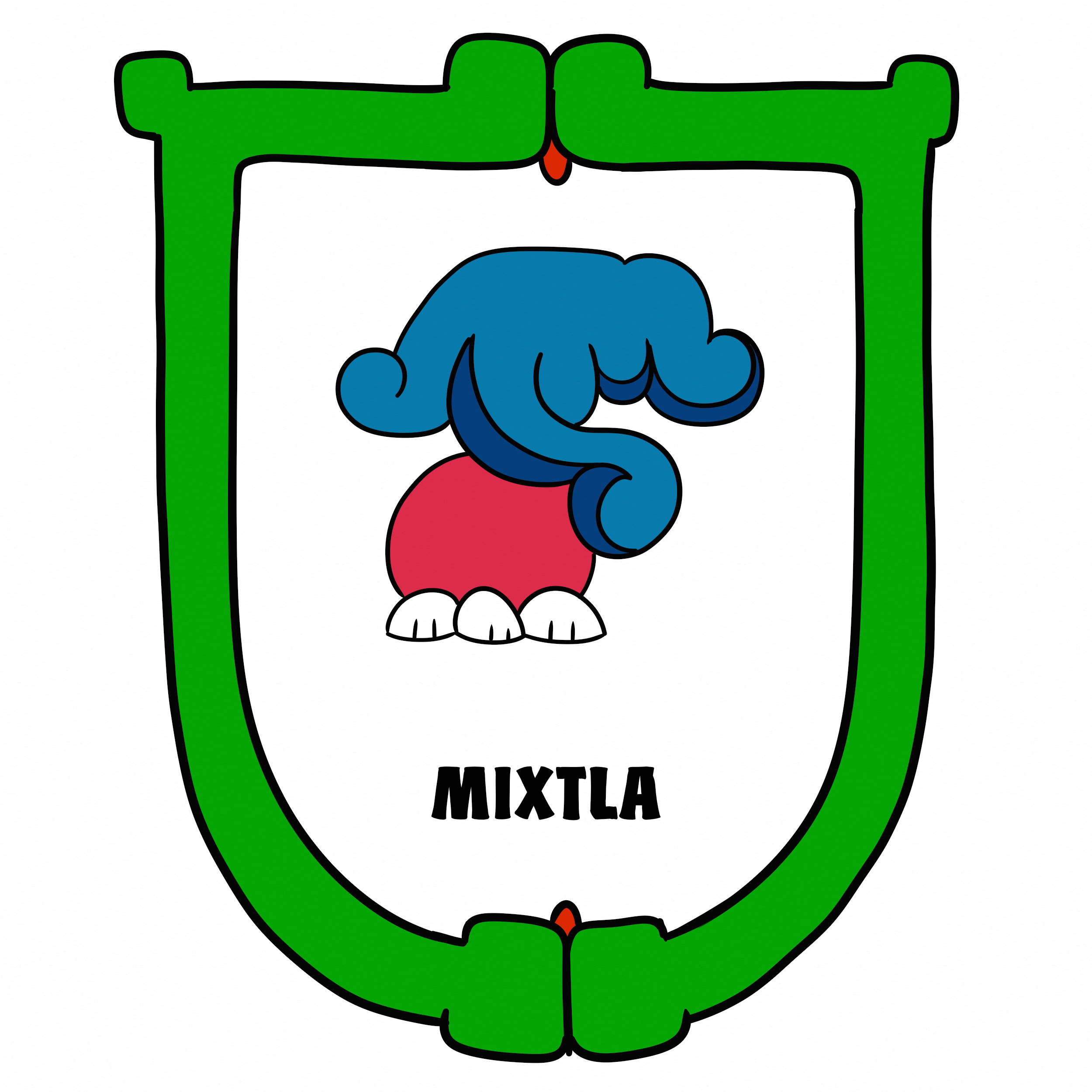
- Seal
- Interactive map of Mixtla
- Country: Mexico
- State: Puebla

Population (2020)
  - Total: 2,668
  - Town: 1,807
- Time zone: UTC-6 (Zona Centro)

Mixtla is a town and municipality in the Mexican state of Puebla. The seat of the municipality is at San Francisco Mixtla.

As of April 2, 2021, Mixtla had presented two confirmed cases but no deaths related to the COVID-19 pandemic in Mexico.

The dismembered body of former municipal president Altamirano Gonzalo Elías Zopiyactle (2005-2007), 48, was found with a narco-message from "Miauuu" on April 2, 2021 in Zongolica along Mexican Federal Highway 123.
