= Tecali de Herrera =

Coordinates: 18°54′N 97°58′W

- Municipality and town
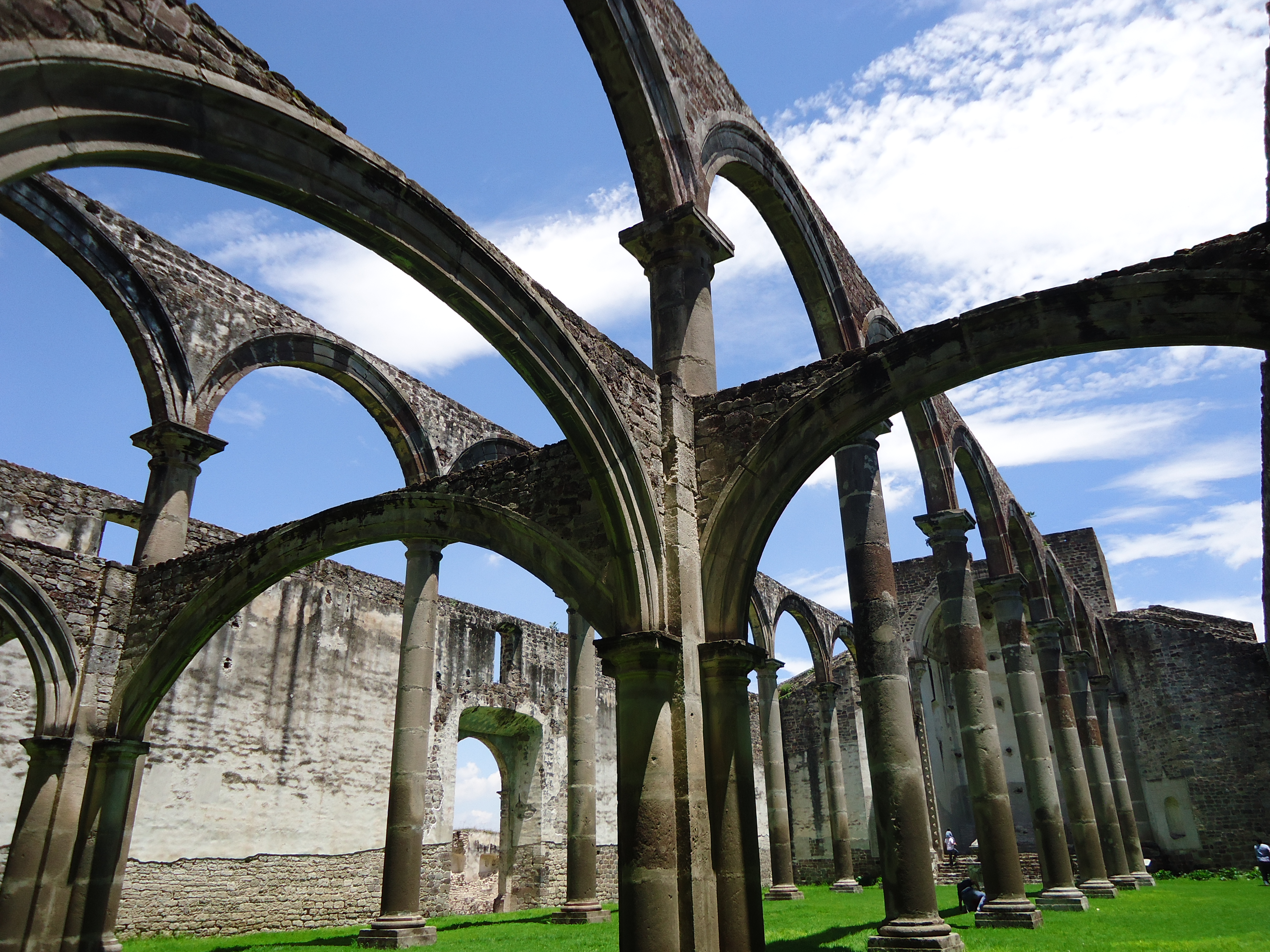
- 16th century Convent of Tecali de Herrera ruins
- Interactive map of Tecali de Herrera
- Country: Mexico
- State: Puebla
- Time zone: UTC-6 (Zona Centro)
- Postal code: 75240

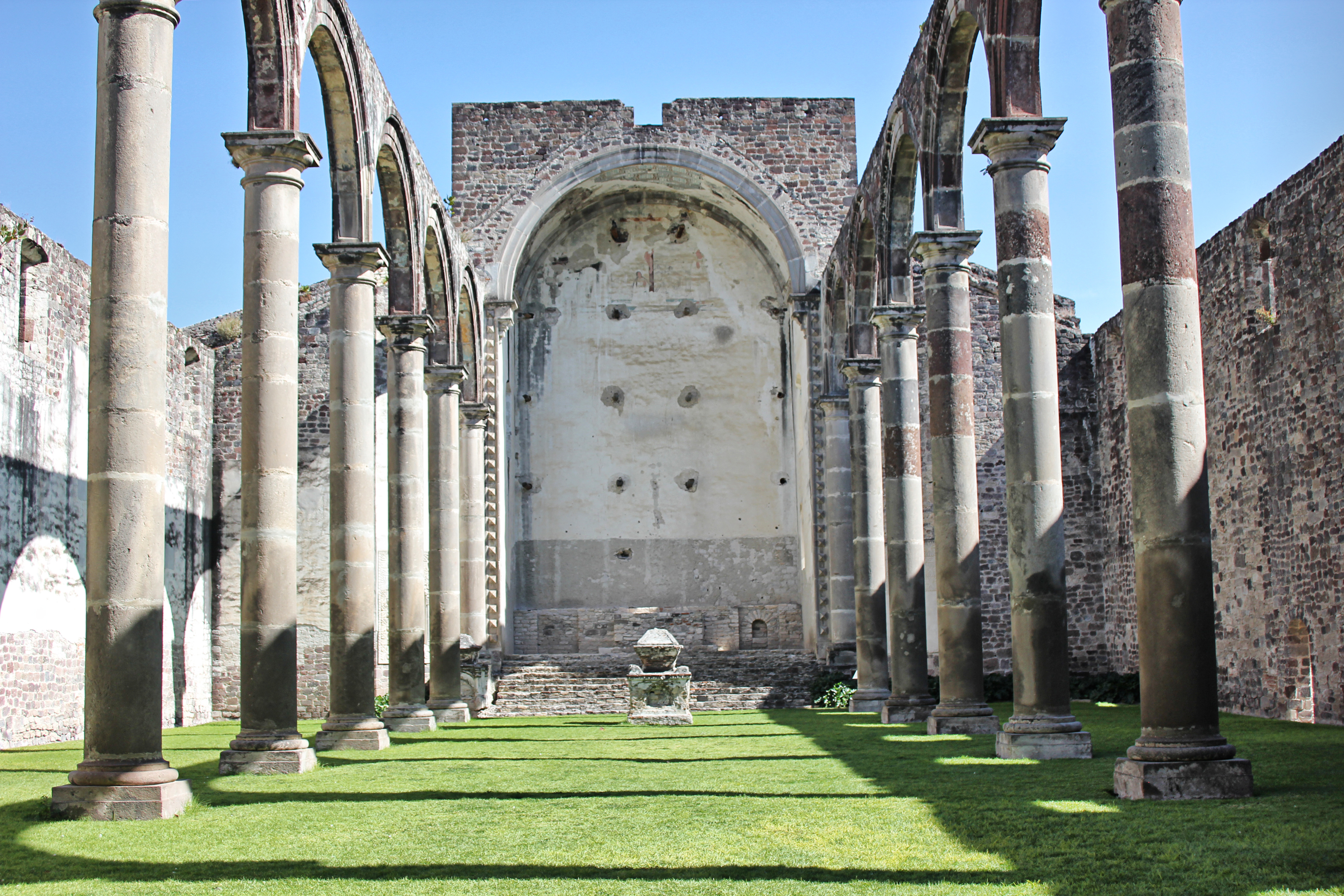
Nave of the Convent of Tecali de Herrera.

Tecali de Herrera is a town and municipality in the Mexican state of Puebla.

== Town ==
The town of Tecali de Herrera is located about 47 kilometres (29 mi) southeast of the city of Puebla.

It is center of onyx artisan objects production in Mexico. The Municipal Market Onyx is supplied by the local union craftsmen.

== History ==
=== Pre-Columbian ===
Tecali was one of the most important cities of the Toltec−Chichimeca nobility, in the pre-Columbian era. It is registered in the "Matricula de Tributos" made during the time of Moctezuma. In the Nahuatl language the name Tecali derives fromtetl (stone) and calli (house), meaning 'where the houses of stone are.'

=== Convent of Tecali de Herrera ===
The ruins of the Spanish colonial era Convent of Tecali of Herrera (Ex-Convento de Tecali de Herrera) are a designated Cultural Heritage Monument in the municipality. The former Franciscan convent was completed in 1540, in New Spain (colonial México). It was designed in the Colonial Spanish Renaissance style by Diego de Arciniega.
