= Antonio Vasconcelos Rueda =

Mexican politician

- Born: 21 August 1970 (age 55); Puebla, Mexico
- Occupation: Politician
- Political party: PAN

Antonio Vasconcelos Rueda (born 21 August 1970) is a Mexican politician affiliated with the National Action Party (PAN). In the 2006 general election he was elected to the Chamber of Deputies to represent Puebla's 8th district during the 60th session of Congress.
