= Acajete, Puebla =

Acajete
- town
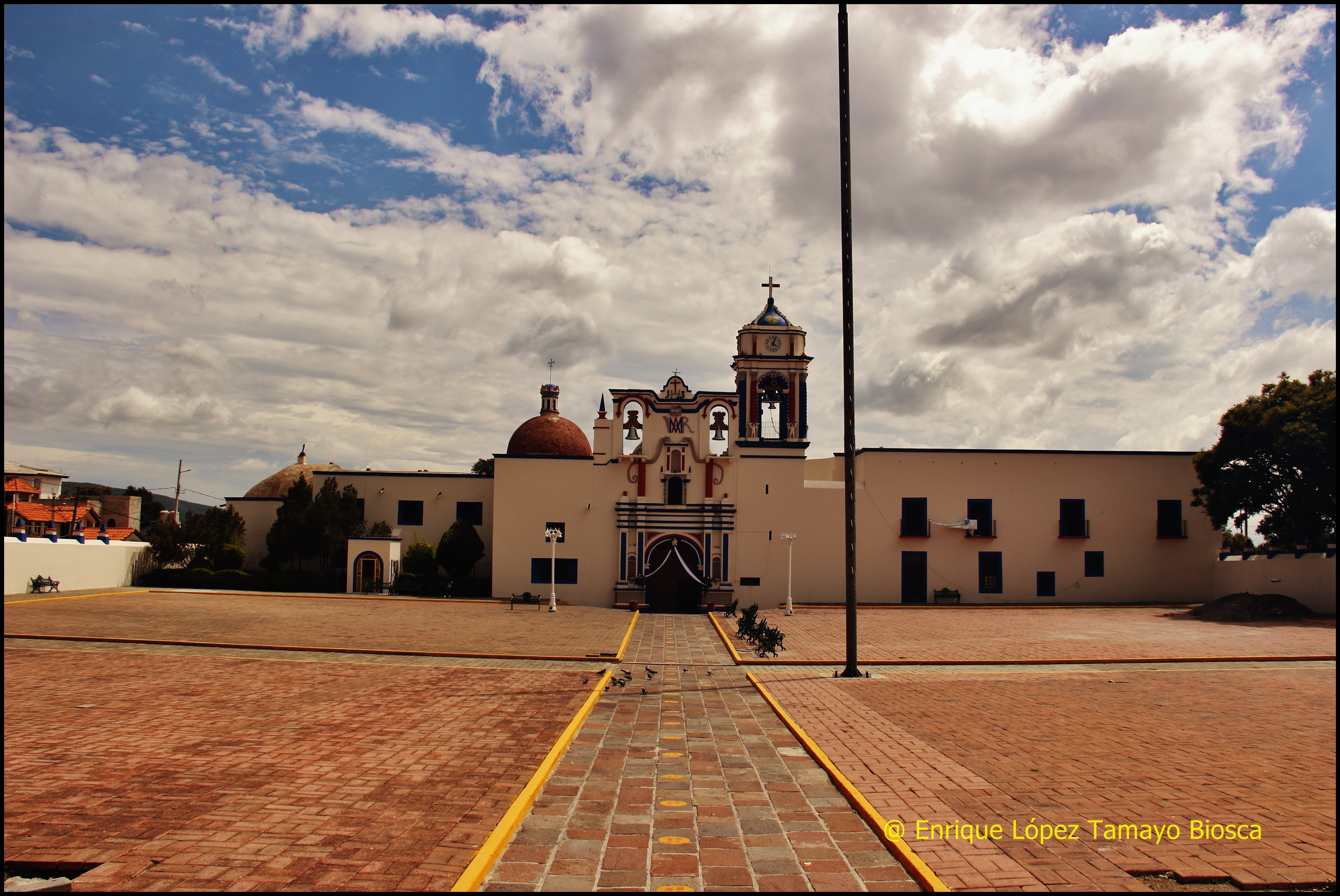

- Coat of arms
- Interactive map of Acajete
- Country: Mexico
- State: Puebla

Government
  - Presidente municipal: David Meléndez López
- Time zone: UTC-6 (Central Standard Time)
  - Summer (DST): UTC-5 (Central Daylight Time)

Acajete is a town in the Mexican state of Puebla. It is the capital of the municipality of the same name. The settlement was founded in 1521 by the Spanish.
