= Acajete Municipality, Puebla =

Acajete
- Municipality
- Acajete within Puebla state

- Coat of arms

- Location within Mexico Location within Puebla (state)
- Coordinates: 19°06′23.4″N 97°57′13.4″W
- Country: Mexico
- State: Puebla

Government
  - Mayor: Cristian Flores

Area
  - Total: 176.9 km^{2} (68.3 sq mi)

Population (March 15, 2020)
  - Total: 72,894
  - Density: 412.1/km^{2} (1,067/sq mi)
- Time zone: UTC−06:00
- Postal code: 75110, 75112–75114, 75116–75119
- MCN: 21001
- Website: Official website

Acajete is a municipality in the Mexican state of Puebla. The municipality is located in the centre of the state and its seat has the same name as the state.
