= Quecholac =

Coordinates: 18.9554°N 97.6575°W

- Municipality and town
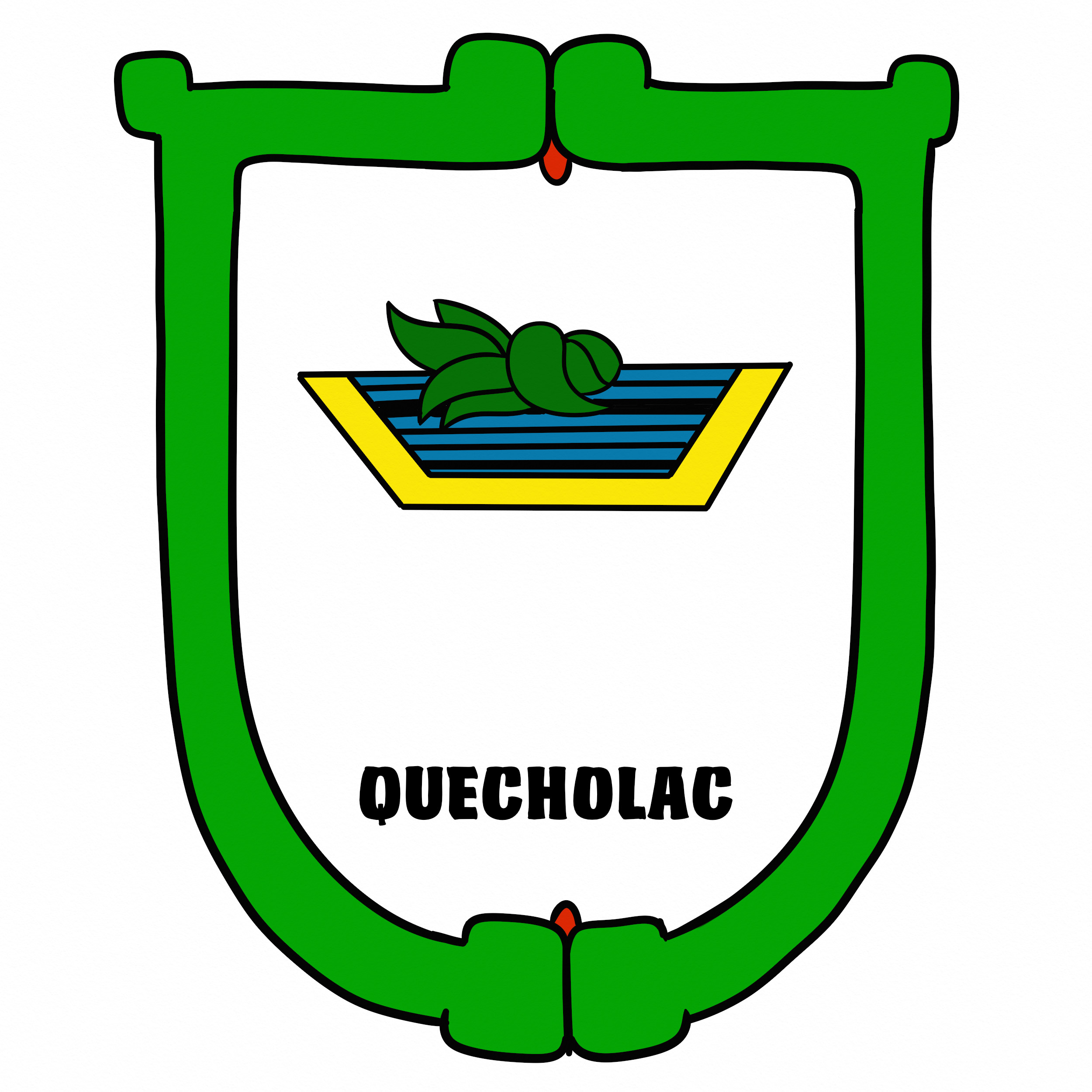
- Coat of arms
- Interactive map of Quecholac
- Country: Mexico
- State: Puebla

Population (2020)
  - Total: 57,992
- Time zone: UTC-6 (Zona Centro)

Quecholac is a town and municipality in the Mexican state of Puebla.
