= San Juan Atenco =

Coordinates: 19°05′N 97°32′W

- Municipality and town
- Interactive map of San Juan Atenco
- Country: Mexico
- State: Puebla
- Time zone: UTC-6 (Zona Centro)

San Juan Atenco is a town and municipality in the Mexican state of Puebla.
