= Jaime Alcántara Silva =

Mexican politician

- Born: 13 April 1950 (age 76); Cuacnolapan, Puebla, Mexico
- Occupation: Politician
- Political party: PRI

Jaime Alcántara Silva (born 13 April 1950) is a Mexican politician from the Institutional Revolutionary Party. He has served as Deputy of the LII and LVIII Legislatures of the Mexican Congress representing Puebla.
