= Tepeaca =

Coordinates: 18.9656°N 97.9042°W

- Municipality
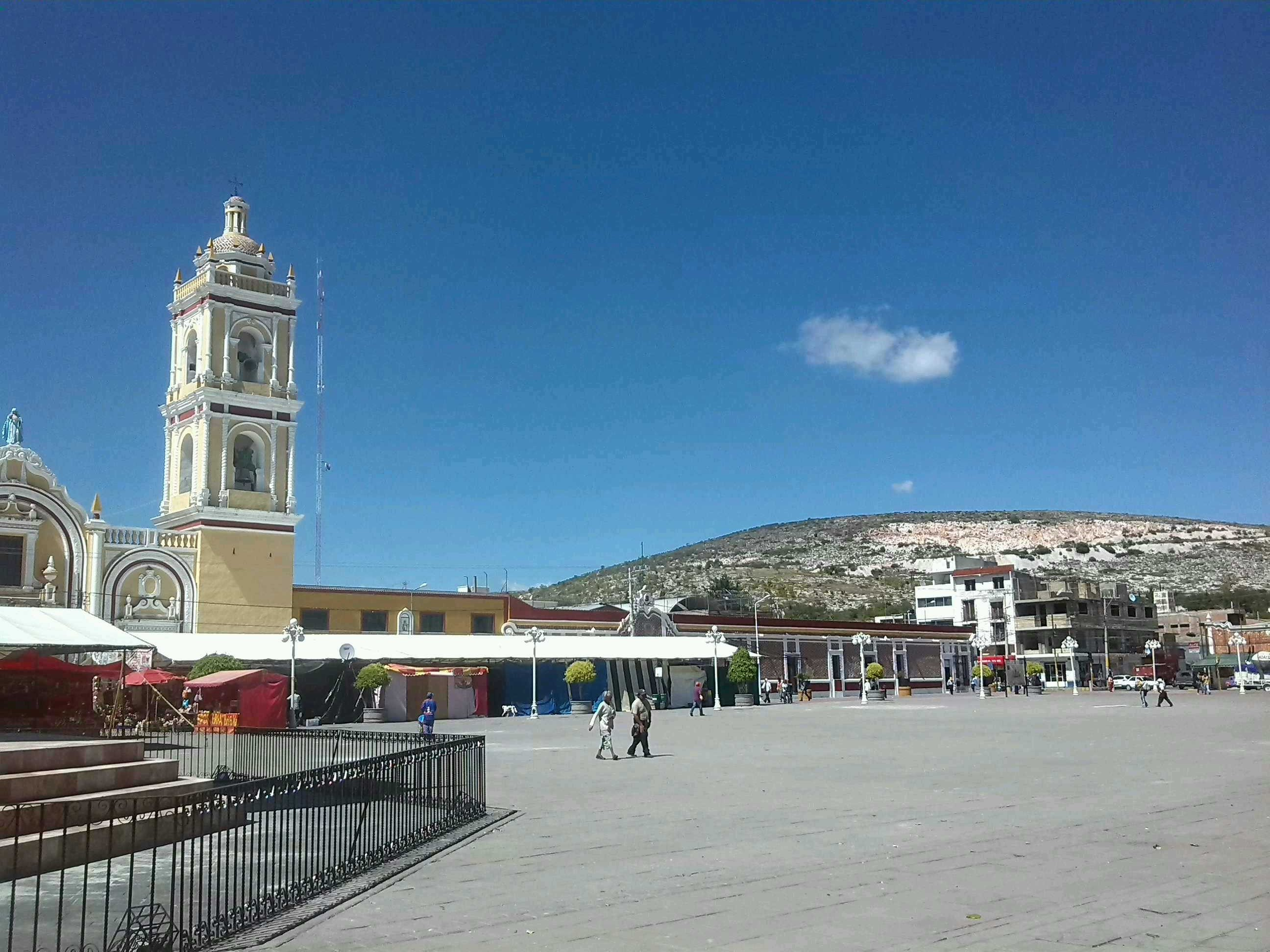

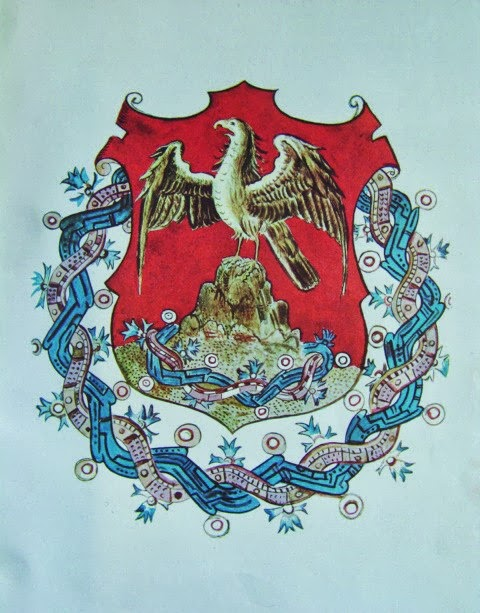
- Coat of arms
- Interactive map of Tepeaca
- Country: Mexico
- State: Puebla
- Time zone: UTC-6 (Zona Centro)

Tepeaca is a municipality in the Mexican state of Puebla. Tepeaca is located 35 km (21.75 mi) from the city of Puebla and is the municipal seat of the municipality of the same name. Its name comes from a Spanish variant of "Tepeyacac" composed of the Nahuatl words tepetl ("hill") and yacatl ("nose tip, which is in the foreground") (can be translated in various ways: "in the top of the hill" or "the principle of the hills"). It has been called Tepeaca de Negrete as it was the birthplace and hometown of General Miguel Negrete Novoa. Along with Tecali Herrera, he extracted the onyx and marble. The town was originally founded by Hernán Cortés as Segura de la Frontera.

In the parish of San Francisco de Asís is a Child Jesus image called the Santo Niño Doctor de los Enfemos. The image is old but devotion to it is relatively recent. The image used to belong to a nun of the Order of Josephine at Concepción Béistegui Hospital in Mexico City. When the nun was transferred to Tepeaca, she brought the image with her and had it with her as she treated the sick. This image has had its own feast day at this church since 1961 on 30 April.

In prehispanic times, Tepeaca was a Nahua altepetl ruled by three related tlatoque. The people were Chichimec descendants and their patron deity was Camaxtli. Acatzingo, and perhaps Tecamachalco and Quecholac were subordinate to Tepeaca. The entire region was conquered by Moctezuma I; it thereafter served as a center of tribute collection for the Aztec Empire and was obliged to make luxury goods available at its market, probably to the benefit of merchants from other settlements.
