= Ciudad Serdán =

Ciudad Serdán San Andrés Chalchicomula
- locality
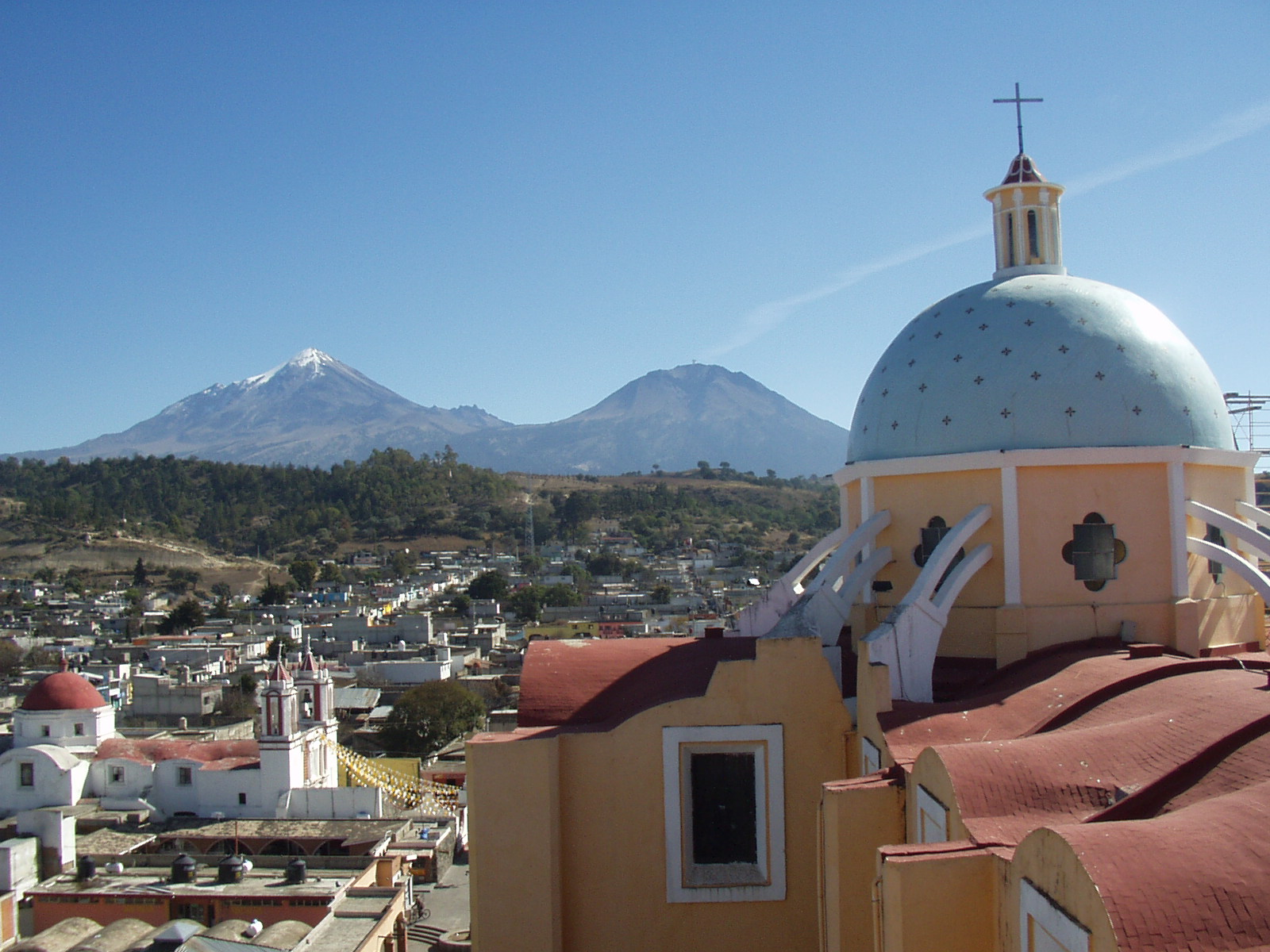

- Location within Puebla (state) Location within Mexico
- Coordinates: 18°59′00″N 97°27′00″W
- Country: Mexico
- State: Puebla
- Municipality: Chalchicomula de Sesma Municipality
- Founded: 1560

Government
  - Municipal President: Juan Navarro
- Elevation: 2,565 m (8,415 ft)

Population (2010)Municipality
  - Total: 23,824
- Time zone: UTC-6 (Central (US Central))
- Postal code (of seat): 75520
- Area code: 245
- Website: (in Spanish)

Ciudad Serdán (formerly San Andrés Chalchicomula) is the municipal seat of Chalchicomula de Sesma Municipality in the Mexican state of Puebla.

Its geographical coordinates are 18° 59′ North, and 97° 27′ West. Its average altitude is 2,520 m (8,270 ft) above sea level.

== Notable people ==
- Gustavo Díaz Ordaz (1911-1979), president of Mexico from 1964-1970
