= Chalchicomula de Sesma Municipality =

Coordinates: 18.9833°N 97.4500°W

Chalchicomula de Sesma
- Municipality
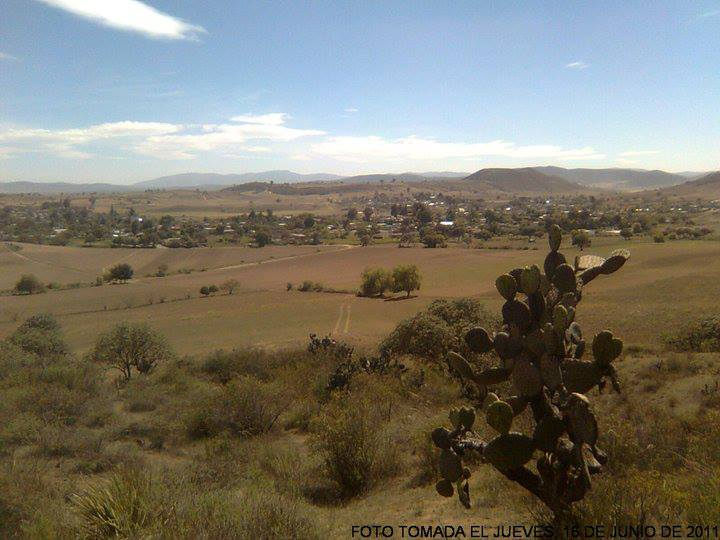

- Coat of arms

- Location of the municipality in Puebla
- Country: Mexico
- State: Puebla

Area
  - Total: 364.85 km^{2} (140.87 sq mi)

Population (2005)
  - Total: 43,882
  - Density: 120.27/km^{2} (311.51/sq mi)
- Time zone: UTC-6 (Zona Centro)

Chalchicomula de Sesma is a municipality in the Mexican state of Puebla.

The seat is Ciudad Serdán.

== Etymology ==
The name of the municipality is of Nahuatl origin and comes from the words chalchihuitl, meaning "turquoise," and xomulli, loosely translated as "hollow" or "nook".
