= Acatzingo =

- Municipality
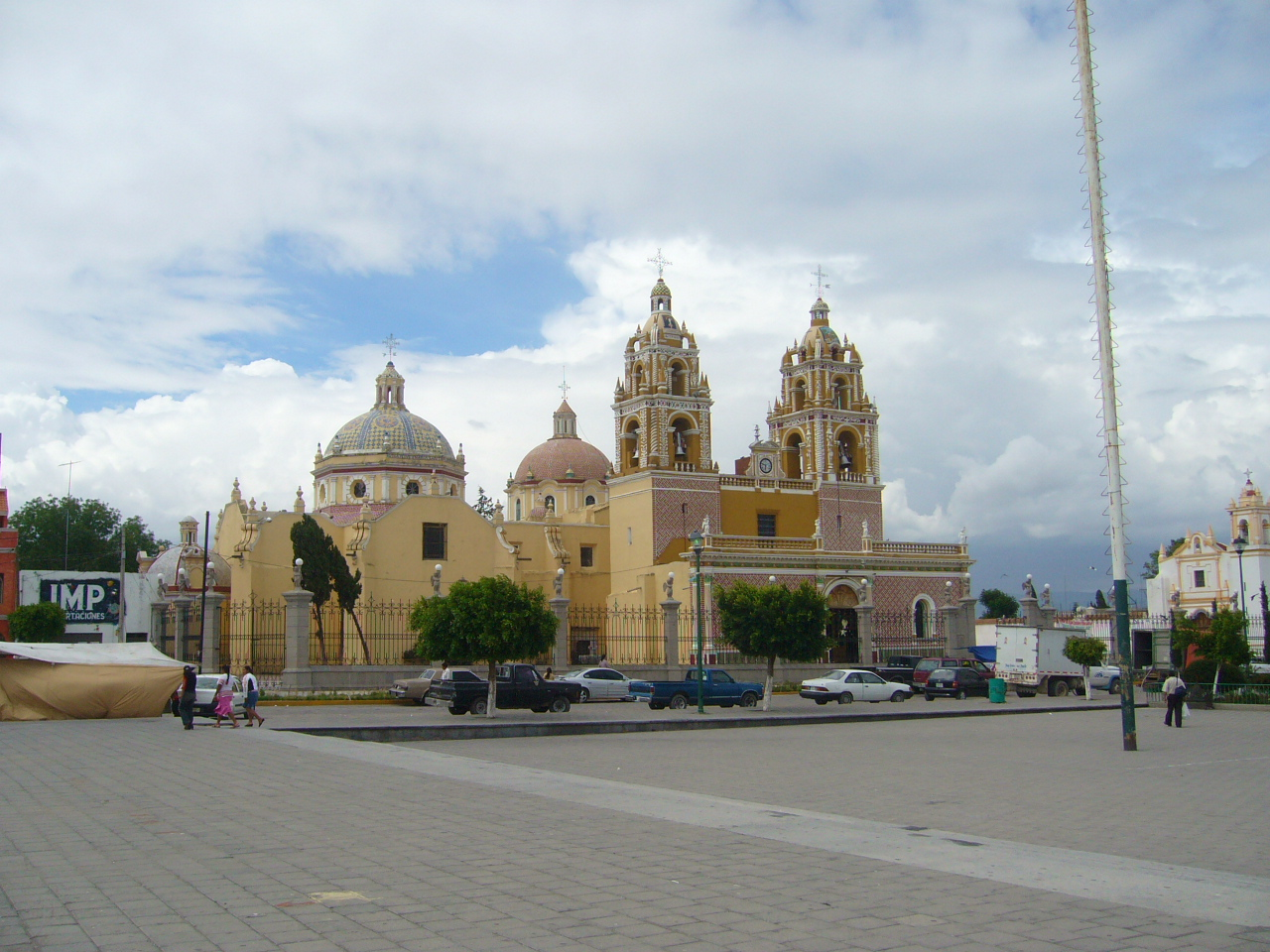
- Church of Acatzingo

- Coat of arms

- Location within Mexico Location within Puebla (state)
- Coordinates: 18°58′49.6″N 97°47′00.4″W
- Country: Mexico
- State: Puebla

Government
  - Mayor: Germán Coleote

Area
  - Total: 140.6 km^{2} (54.3 sq mi)

Population (March 15, 2020)
  - Total: 63,743
  - Density: 453.4/km^{2} (1,174/sq mi)
- Time zone: UTC−06:00
- Postal code: 75150, 75151, 75153–75159
- MCN: 21004
- Website: Official website

Acatzingo is a municipality in the Mexican state of Puebla.

The BUAP has a Regional Section there.

== Geography ==
=== Climate ===
Climate data for Acatzingo de Hidalgo (1951–2010)
| Month | Jan | Feb | Mar | Apr | May | Jun | Jul | Aug | Sep | Oct | Nov | Dec | Year |
|---|---|---|---|---|---|---|---|---|---|---|---|---|---|
| Record high °C (°F) | 32.0 (89.6) | 35.0 (95.0) | 35.0 (95.0) | 36.0 (96.8) | 36.0 (96.8) | 37.0 (98.6) | 34.0 (93.2) | 38.0 (100.4) | 34.0 (93.2) | 33.0 (91.4) | 33.0 (91.4) | 32.0 (89.6) | 38.0 (100.4) |
| Mean daily maximum °C (°F) | 23.9 (75.0) | 25.4 (77.7) | 27.9 (82.2) | 29.5 (85.1) | 29.2 (84.6) | 27.1 (80.8) | 26.1 (79.0) | 26.8 (80.2) | 25.8 (78.4) | 25.7 (78.3) | 25.0 (77.0) | 24.1 (75.4) | 26.4 (79.5) |
| Daily mean °C (°F) | 14.1 (57.4) | 15.2 (59.4) | 17.4 (63.3) | 19.2 (66.6) | 19.9 (67.8) | 19.2 (66.6) | 18.4 (65.1) | 18.7 (65.7) | 18.3 (64.9) | 17.4 (63.3) | 15.8 (60.4) | 14.4 (57.9) | 17.3 (63.1) |
| Mean daily minimum °C (°F) | 4.3 (39.7) | 5.1 (41.2) | 6.9 (44.4) | 9.0 (48.2) | 10.6 (51.1) | 11.4 (52.5) | 10.6 (51.1) | 10.5 (50.9) | 10.9 (51.6) | 9.0 (48.2) | 6.6 (43.9) | 4.8 (40.6) | 8.3 (46.9) |
| Record low °C (°F) | −7.0 (19.4) | −7.0 (19.4) | −4.0 (24.8) | 0.0 (32.0) | 1.0 (33.8) | 5.0 (41.0) | 0.0 (32.0) | 4.0 (39.2) | 4.0 (39.2) | −1.0 (30.2) | −8.5 (16.7) | −5.0 (23.0) | −8.5 (16.7) |
| Average precipitation mm (inches) | 12.2 (0.48) | 10.6 (0.42) | 9.9 (0.39) | 35.4 (1.39) | 91.1 (3.59) | 151.9 (5.98) | 94.1 (3.70) | 86.8 (3.42) | 116.0 (4.57) | 51.6 (2.03) | 14.4 (0.57) | 7.9 (0.31) | 681.9 (26.85) |
| Average precipitation days (≥ 0.1 mm) | 1.3 | 1.3 | 1.6 | 5.2 | 10.2 | 13.3 | 10.5 | 10.2 | 11.5 | 6.2 | 2.1 | 1.1 | 74.5 |
Source: Servicio Meteorologico Nacional
