= Esperanza (municipality) =

Coordinates: 18.8630°N 97.3765°W

- Municipality
- Location of the municipality in Puebla
- Country: Mexico
- State: Puebla

Population (2020)
  - Total: 14,766
- Time zone: UTC-6 (Zona Centro)

Esperanza is a municipality in the Mexican state of Puebla.
