= 1843 in Mexico =

- Decades: 1820s; 1830s; 1840s; 1850s; 1860s
- See also: History of Mexico; List of years in Mexico; Timeline of Mexican history

Events in the year 1843 in Mexico.

== Incumbents ==
- President:
  - until March 4: Nicolás Bravo
  - March 4 – October 4: Antonio López de Santa Anna
  - starting October 4: Valentín Canalizo

=== Governors ===
- Aguascalientes: Mariano Chico Navarro
- Chiapas: Ignacio Barberena
- Chihuahua: Mariano Monterde/Mariano Martínez de Lejarza/Mariano Monterde
- Coahuila: Francisco Mejía/José Juan Sánchez Estrada
- Durango:
- Guanajuato:
- Guerrero:
- Jalisco: Mariano Paredes y Arrillaga/José María Jarero/José Antonio Mozo
- State of Mexico:
- Michoacán:
- Nuevo León: Manuel María de Llano
- Oaxaca:
- Puebla:
- Querétaro: Julián Juvera
- San Luis Potosí:
- Sinaloa:
- Sonora:
- Tabasco:
- Tamaulipas: Francisco Vital Fernandez/Jose Ignacio Gutierrez/Juan Nepomuceno Cortina
- Veracruz:
- Yucatán: Miguel Barbachano
- Zacatecas:

== Events ==
- April 30 – May 16 – Naval Battle of Campeche: Naval Battle between the Mexican Navy versus the Texas Navy and the Yucatán Navy. The battle featured the most advanced warships of its day.
- August 23 – President Antonio López de Santa Anna announced that the annexation of Texas by the United States would be considered an act of war by Mexico.

== Notable deaths ==
- March 21 — Guadalupe Victoria, 1st President of Mexico (b. 1786)
