= 1847 in Mexico =

- Decades: 1820s; 1830s; 1840s; 1850s; 1860s
- See also: History of Mexico; List of years in Mexico; Timeline of Mexican history

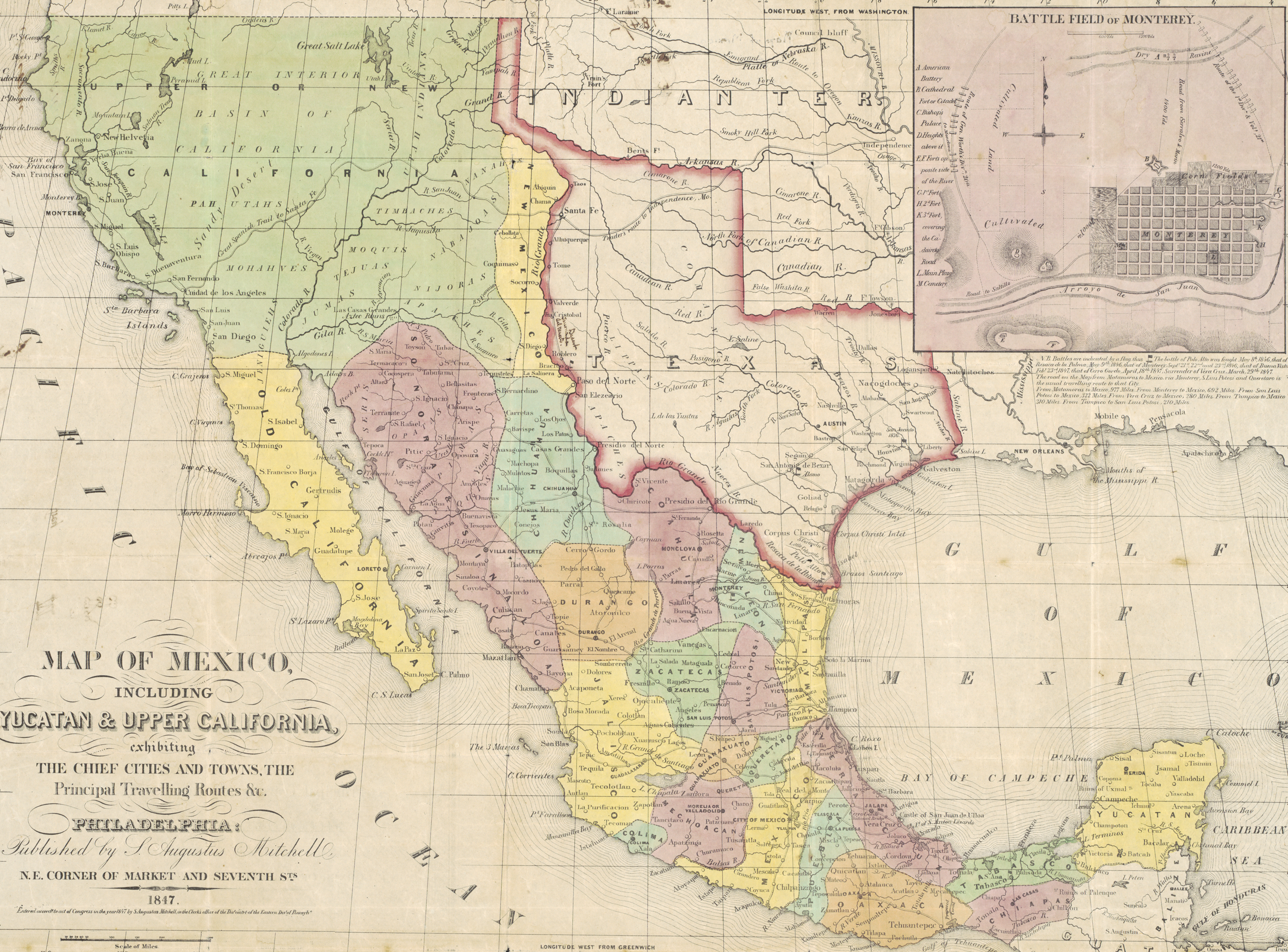
1847 map of Mexico

Events in the year 1847 in Mexico.

== Incumbents ==
- President:
  - until March 21: Valentín Gómez Farías
  - March 21 – April 2: Antonio López de Santa Anna
  - April 2 – May 20: Pedro María de Anaya
  - May 20 – September 15: Antonio López de Santa Anna
  - September 16 – November 13: Manuel de la Peña y Peña
  - starting November 13: Pedro María de Anaya

=== Governors ===
- Aguascalientes: Felipe Cosio
- Chiapas: Jerónimo Cardona
- Chihuahua: Ángel Trías Álvarez/Laureano Muñoz Arregui/José María Sánchez Pareja/Laureano Muñoz Arregui/Ángel Trías Álvarez
- Coahuila: José María de Aguirre González/N/A
- Durango:
- Guanajuato:
- Guerrero:
- Jalisco: Joaquín Angulo/Sabás Sánchez Hidalgo
- State of Mexico:
- Michoacán:
- Nuevo León: José María Parás
- Oaxaca: Benito Juárez
- Puebla:
- Querétaro: Francisco Berdusco/Francisco de Paula Mesa
- San Luis Potosí:
- Sinaloa:
- Sonora:
- Tabasco:
- Tamaulipas: Francisco Vital Fernandez
- Veracruz: Manuel Gutiérrez Zamora/José de Emparán/Manuel Gutiérrez Zamora
- Yucatán: Miguel Barbachano/Santiago Méndez
- Zacatecas:

== Events ==
- January 13 – The Treaty of Cahuenga ends the fighting in the Mexican–American War in California.
- February 22 – Mexican–American War – Battle of Buena Vista: 5,000 American troops under General Zachary Taylor use their superiority in artillery to drive off 15,000 Mexican troops under Antonio López de Santa Anna, defeating the Mexicans the next day.
- March 9 – Mexican–American War: United States forces under General Winfield Scott invade Mexico near Veracruz.
- March 29 – Mexican–American War: United States forces led by General Winfield Scott take Veracruz after a siege.
- April 18 – Mexican–American War – Battle of Cerro Gordo: U.S. troops of General Winfield Scott begin to advance along the aqueduct around Lake Chalco and Lake Xochimilco in Mexico
- August 20 – Mexican–American War: US troops defeat Mexican troops in Valencia de Fuentes, Mexico
- September 8 – Battle of Molino Del Rey
