= 1846 in Mexico =

- Decades: 1820s; 1830s; 1840s; 1850s; 1860s
- See also: History of Mexico; List of years in Mexico; Timeline of Mexican history

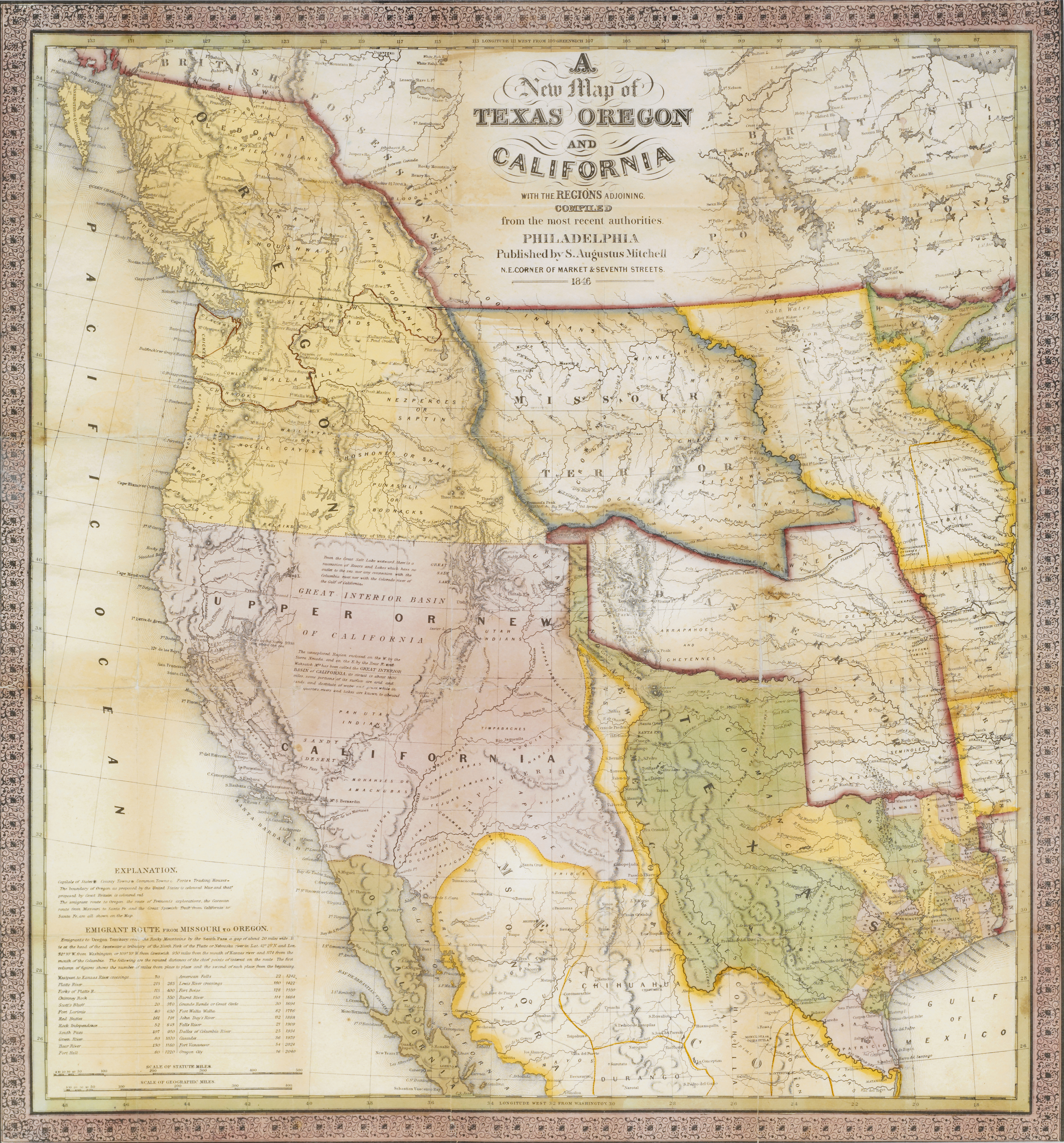
Map of Texas, Oregon, and California in 1846

Events in the year 1846 in Mexico.

== Incumbents ==
- President – Mariano Paredes
- President – José Mariano Salas
- President – Valentín Gómez Farías

=== Governors ===
- Aguascalientes: Felipe Nieto y del Portillo/Felipe Cosio
- Chiapas: Jerónimo Cardona
- Chihuahua: Ángel Trías Álvarez/Mauricio Ugarte/Cayetano Justiniani/José María Irigoyen Rodríguez/Ángel Trías Álvarez
- Coahuila: Rafael Vázquez/José María de Aguirre González/Santiago Rodríguez del Bosquea
- Durango:
- Guanajuato:
- Guerrero:
- Jalisco: Antonio Escobedo/Juan Nepomuceno Cumplido/José María Yáñez/Joaquín Angulo
- State of Mexico:
- Michoacán:
- Nuevo León: Pedro de Ampudia
- Oaxaca:
- Puebla:
- Querétaro: Julián Juvera
- San Luis Potosí:
- Sinaloa:
- Sonora:
- Tabasco:
- Tamaulipas: Juan Martin de la Garza Flores/Manuel Núñez Ponce/Manuel Saldaña/Francisco Vital Fernandez
- Veracruz: Manuel Gutiérrez Zamora/José de Emparán/Manuel Gutiérrez Zamora
- Yucatán: Miguel Barbachano
- Zacatecas:

== Events ==
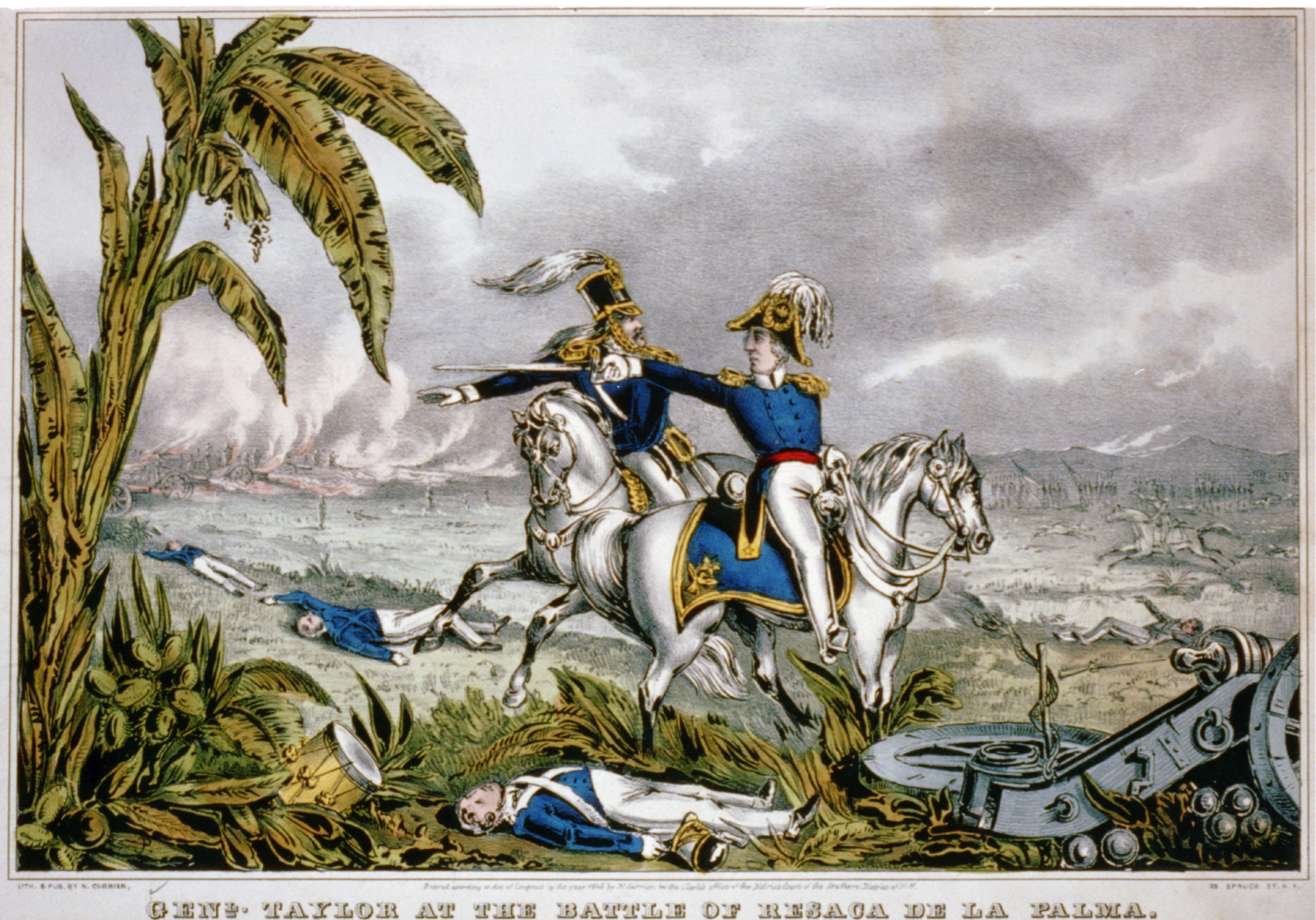
Zachary Taylor at the Battle of Resaca de la Palma

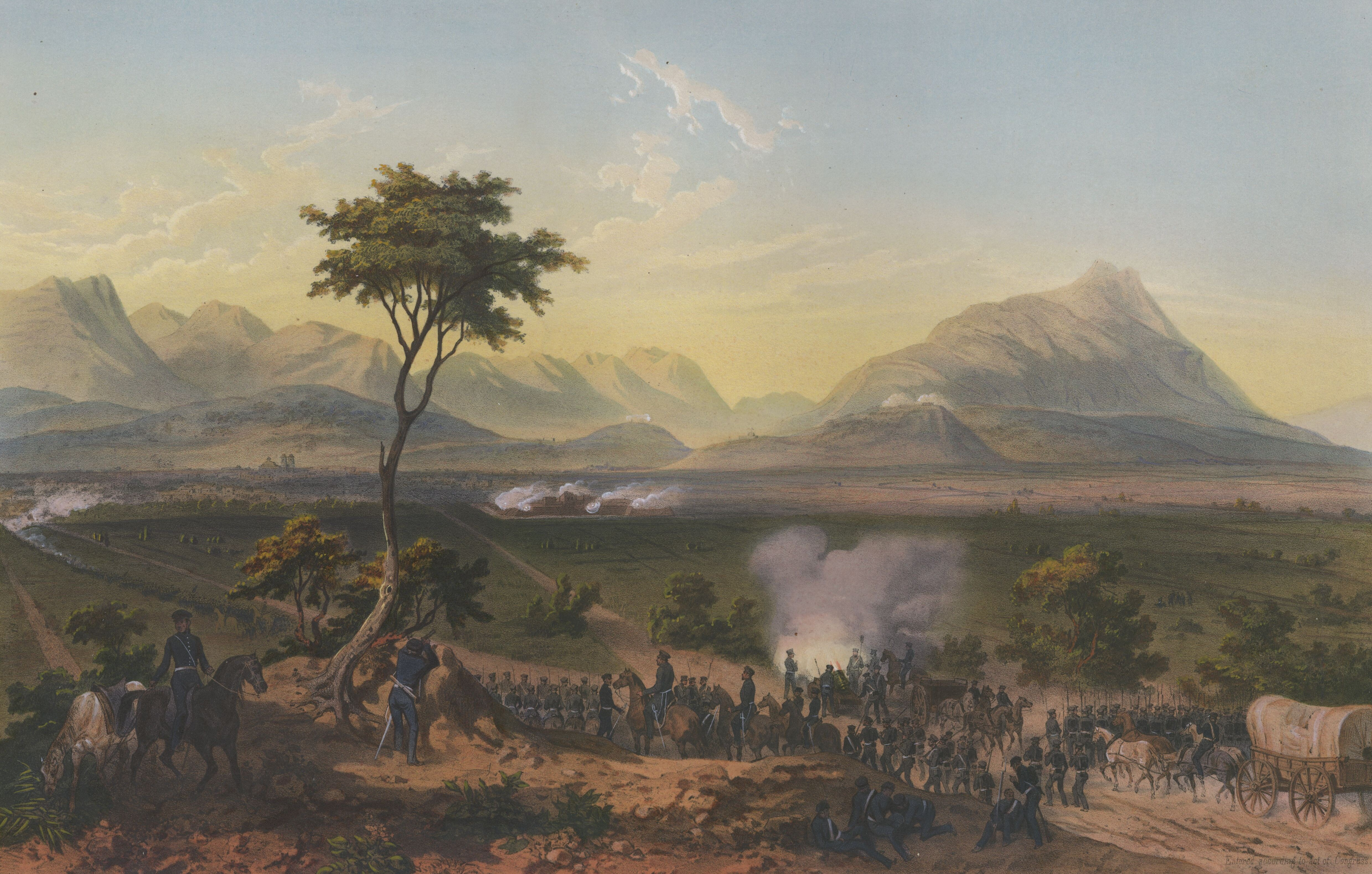
September 21–24: Battle of Monterrey (Mexican–American War).

- April 25 – Mexican–American War: Open conflict begins over border disputes of Texas's boundaries.
- May 8 – Mexican–American War – Battle of Palo Alto: Zachary Taylor defeats a Mexican force north of the Rio Grande at Palo Alto, Texas, in the first major battle of the war.
- May 9 – Mexican–American War – Battle of Resaca de la Palma in Brownsville, Texas
- May 13 – Mexican–American War: The United States declares war on Mexico.
- June 10 – Mexican–American War: The California Republic declares independence from Mexico.
- June 14 – Bear Flag Revolt: American settlers in Sonoma, California, start a rebellion against Mexico and proclaim the California Republic.
- July 7 – Acting on instructions from Washington, DC, Commodore John Drake Sloat orders his troops to occupy Monterey and Yerba Buena, thus beginning the United States annexation of California.
- August 6 – José Mariano Salas assumes the presidency as provisional president.
- August 22 – President Salas decrees the 1824 Constitution of Mexico in effect again.
- September 21–24 – Battle of Monterrey

== Notable births ==
- May 22 – Rita Cetina Gutiérrez, teacher, poet and activist (d. 1908)
