= 1839 in Mexico =

- Decades: 1810s; 1820s; 1830s; 1840s; 1850s
- See also: History of Mexico; List of years in Mexico; Timeline of Mexican history

Events in the year 1839 in Mexico.

== Incumbents ==
- President – Anastasio Bustamante until March 20, Antonio López de Santa Anna until July 10, Nicolás Bravo until July 19, Anastasio Bustamante

=== Governors ===
- Aguascalientes:
- Chiapas: Salvador Ayanegui
- Chihuahua: Berardo Revilla/José María Irigoyen Rodríguez/Simón Elías González/José María Irigoyen de la O/José María Irigoyen Rodríguez/José María Irigoyen de la O
- Coahuila: Francisco García Conde/Isidro Reyes
- Durango:
- Guanajuato:
- Guerrero:
- Jalisco: Antonio Escobedo
- State of Mexico:
- Michoacán:
- Nuevo León: Joaquín García/Manuel María de Llano
- Oaxaca:
- Puebla:
- Querétaro: Ramón Covarrubias
- San Luis Potosí:
- Sinaloa:
- Sonora:
- Tabasco:
- Tamaulipas: José Antonio Fernández Izaguirre/Jose Antonio Quintero
- Veracruz:
- Yucatán:
- Zacatecas:

== Events ==
- November 27, 1838 – March 9, 1839 – Pastry War
- May 2, 1839 – Santiago Imán heads a peasant revolt in the Yucatán.
- May 3, 1839 - José Antonio Mexía captured and executed by firing squad.
- December 27, 1939 - The first Spanish envoy to independent Mexico, Ángel Calderón de la Barca y Belgrano arrived in Veracruz. His wife was Fanny Calderón de la Barca who wrote Life in Mexico, a well-known book about the couples' life from 1839 to 1843 in Mexico.

== Notable births ==
- * May 25 Manuel Sánchez Mármol – writer, lawyer, politician, and a member of the Mexican Academy of Language was born in Cunduacán, Tabasco

== Notable deaths ==
- May 3 José Antonio Mexía – politician executed in Acajete, Veracruz (born 1800)

=== Dates unknown ===
- José María Lanz – engineer and author, died in Paris (born 1764)
- Francisco María Ruiz – soldier and settler of San Diego, Alta California (born 1754)
