= Domingo Barret =

Mexican politician

9th President of the Republic of Yucatán and Governor of Yucatán
- In office January 21, 1847 – October 3, 1847
- Preceded by: Miguel Barbachano
- Succeeded by: Santiago Méndez

Personal details
- Born: Domingo Barret Echeverri Campeche, New Spain
- Died: Campeche, Mexico
- Occupation: Politician

Domingo Barret Echeverri was governor of Yucatán, Mexico. He was interim governor of Yucatán in 1847 during the beginning of the so-called War of the Castes and the time when turning Mexico war with the United States of America, Yucatán decided to remain neutral in the conflict.

He belonged to the political group Santiago Méndez Ibarra, who represented the interests against those of Campeche Mérida (Yucatán) that were represented by the group of Miguel Barbachano, during the conflict years prior to the decision of the state of Yucatán and Campeche separation just at the beginning of the so-called Caste War, which was staged in the Yucatán Peninsula from 1847 to 1901. The political leader Santiago Méndez Ibarra, Gov. Domingo Barret, and his hosts, exhausted their resources to resolve the situation and went to the extent of offering sovereignty to Yucatán couple get help resolving the war situation worsened day by day. At the end of such a situation Campeche had no choice but to summon the internal drive, Miguel Barbachano calling for him to return to Cuba, commissioning him to negotiate peace with the Indians. On October 3, 1847, Barrett handed power to Mendez who later would give it to Miguel Barbachano turn to take charge of serious conflict had begun.
