= Joaquín Díaz Mena =

Mexican politician (born 1974)

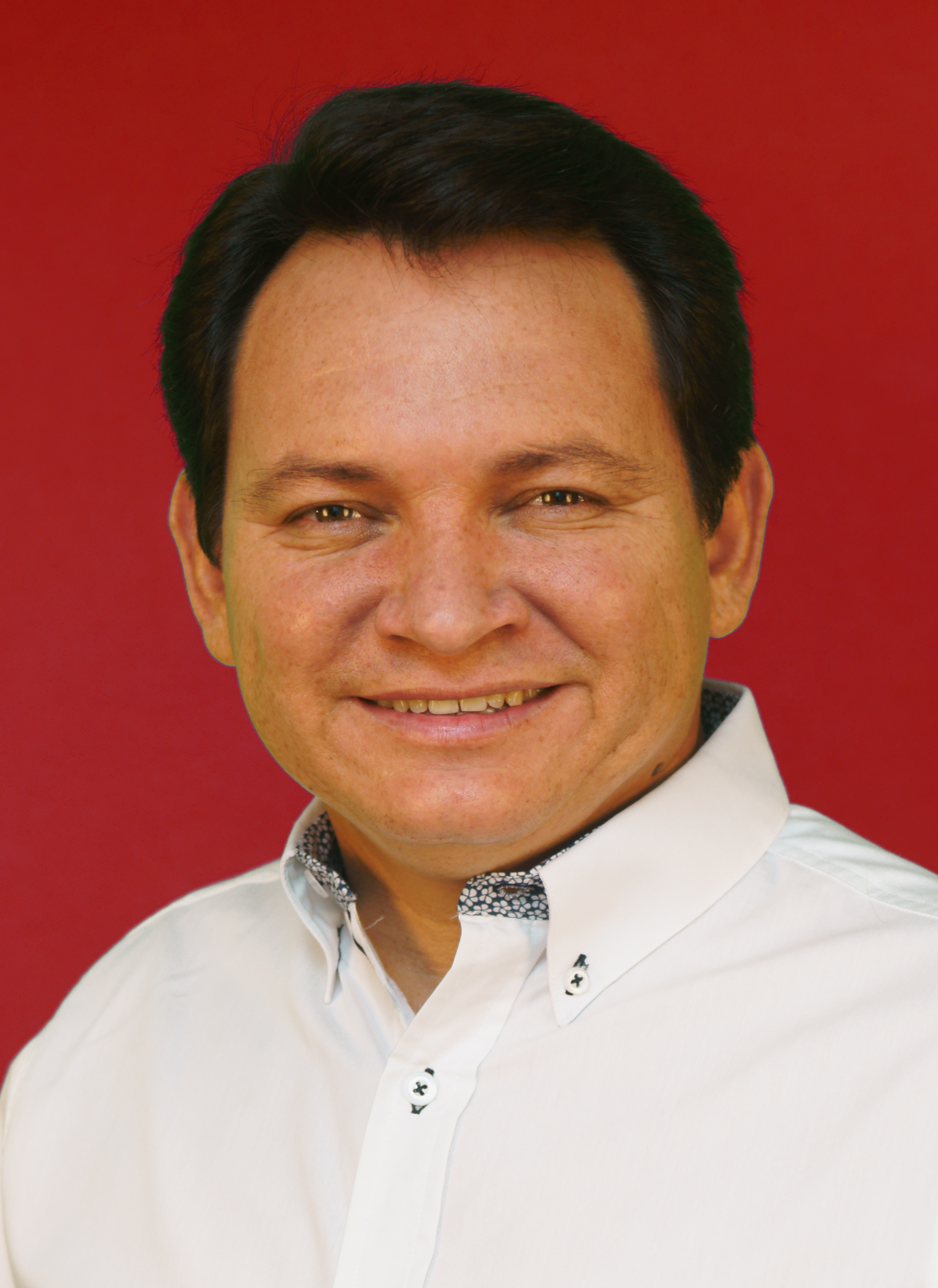

Governor of Yucatán
- Incumbent
- Assumed office 1 October 2024
- Preceded by: Mauricio Vila Dosal

Member of the Chamber of Deputies
- In office 1 September 2006 – 30 August 2009
- Preceded by: Roger Alcocer
- Succeeded by: Liborio Vidal Aguilar

Personal details
- Born: Joaquín Jesús Díaz Mena; 16 August 1974 (age 51) San Felipe, Yucatán, Mexico
- Party: MORENA
- Occupation: Politician

Joaquín Jesús Díaz Mena (born 16 August 1974), nicknamed Huacho, is a Mexican politician currently from the National Regeneration Movement (Morena). He was a federal deputy during the 63rd session of Congress, representing Yucatán from the third electoral region. He is the current Governor of Yucatán, in which office he has served since 1 October 2024.

== Life ==
Díaz Mena obtained a degree in Tourism Business Administration-Hotels and Restaurants from the Instituto Tecnológico de Mérida in 1994; he managed the Mesón Hacienda restaurant, and the Hotel Club Las Velas in Cancún. Additionally, he was a teacher; in 1997, he began a four-year stint as a Telesecundaria teacher, spending two of those years at the Colegio de Bachilleres de Yucatán. In the late 1990s he also began ranching; he got involved with the Ganadería San Joaquín, and with the Asociación Ganadera de San Felipe, Yucatán, the local cattle ranchers' association.

In 2001, Díaz Mena began his political career when he became the municipal president of San Felipe; in the following year he joined the National Action Party (PAN). In 2004, he was sent as a deputy to the LVII Legislature of Yucatán, where he presided over the Education, Science, Art and Technology Commission; during his two years in the state legislature, he briefly served as the Yucatán state PAN's finance secretary and began studying to obtain his master's degrees, one in public administration from the Universidad del Mayab and the other from the National Autonomous University of Mexico (UNAM) in urban and regional economics.

In 2006, voters in the First federal electoral district of Yucatán, with seat on Valladolid, sent Díaz Mena to the federal Chamber of Deputies for the first time. In the 60th Congress, he was a secretary on the Fishing Commission and also sat on those dealing with Indigenous Matters and Special for Regional Development Projects in Southern and Southeastern Mexico. After leaving the Chamber of Deputies, he became a national-level PAN instructor, a national councilor, and from 2010 to 2011, the local secretary of training for the PAN in San Felipe, and a delegate and teacher for the Secretariat of Public Education (SEP). In 2013, Díaz Mena was said to have temporarily disappeared after a controversy erupted over his being given a high-level educational position without having applied for it.

Díaz Mena mounted a bid for governor of Yucatán as the PAN candidate in 2012, but ultimately lost to the PRI candidate, Rolando Zapata Bello.

In 2015, Díaz Mena returned to San Lázaro, this time as a proportional representation deputy from the third region. He was the secretary of the Indigenous Matters and South/Southeastern Border Matters Commissions and also served on the Public Education and Educational Services Commission. He briefly left the Chamber of Deputies in February 2016 after coming down with type A influenza, though he initially had feared he had contracted the zika virus.

=== Party switch to Morena and gubernatorial candidacies ===
On 5 March 2018, Díaz Mena announced his resignation from the PAN and that he would become a member of National Regeneration Movement (Morena), declaring that the state party had become a "rich kids' club" and calling out party leaders for leading the "decomposition" of the institution, saying that if the party's founders came back to life, they would be disappointed at its current state. Twelve days later, Morena and the other parties in the Juntos Haremos Historia coalition nominated Díaz Mena as their gubernatorial candidate.

On election day, Díaz Mena pulled 20.45 percent of the vote, placing third behind PRI candidate Mauricio Sahuí Rivero and the winner, PAN candidate Mauricio Vila Dosal.

Díaz Mena contended again for the governorship of Yucatán in the 2 June 2024 election, representing the Morena-led Sigamos Haciendo Historia coalition. This time he won.
