= 1842 in Mexico =

- Decades: 1820s; 1830s; 1840s; 1850s; 1860s
- See also: History of Mexico; List of years in Mexico; Timeline of Mexican history

Events in the year 1842 in Mexico.

== Incumbents ==
- President:
  - Antonio López de Santa Anna until October 26
  - Nicolás Bravo after October 26

=== Governors ===
- Aguascalientes:
- Chiapas: Salvador Ayanegui
- Chihuahua: Francisco García Conde/Mariano Martínez de Lejarza/Francisco García Conde/Mariano Monterde
- Coahuila: José Ignacio de Arizpe/Francisco Mejía
- Durango:
- Guanajuato:
- Guerrero:
- Jalisco: Antonio Escobedo
- State of Mexico:
- Michoacán:
- Nuevo León: Manuel María de Llano
- Oaxaca:
- Puebla:
- Querétaro: Sabás Antonio Domínguez/José Francisco Figueroa/Julián Juvera
- San Luis Potosí:
- Sinaloa:
- Sonora:
- Tabasco:
- Tamaulipas: Jose Antonio Quintero
- Veracruz:
- Yucatán: Miguel Barbachano
- Zacatecas:

== Events ==
- March 5 – Mexican troops led by Rafael Vasquez invade Texas, briefly occupy San Antonio, and then head back to the Rio Grande. This is the first such invasion since the Texas Revolution.

== Notable births ==
- September 8 – Juan José Carrillo, Mayor of Santa Monica, California was born in Santa Barbara, Alta California (died 1916)
- October 8 – Francisco del Paso y Troncoso, historian and Nahuatl scholar was born in Veracruz, Veracruz (died 1916)

== Notable deaths ==
- August 24 – Leona Vicario, supporter of the Mexican War of Independence and wife of Andrés Quintana Roo (born 1789)

=== Dates unknown ===
- Silvestre De León, soldier and third Alcalde of Victoria murdered in Victoria (born 1802)
- José Mariano Elízaga, composer died in Morelia (born 1786)
- Agustín V. Zamorano, printer and Governor of Alta California died in San Diego (born 1798)
