= José Tiburcio López Constante =

Mexican politician and governor of Yucatán

José Tiburcio López

3rd President of the Republic of Yucatán and Governor of Yucatán
- In office June 2, 1844 – January 1, 1846
- Preceded by: Miguel Barbachano
- Succeeded by: Miguel Barbachano

Personal details
- Born: José Tiburcio López Constante after 1790 Mérida, New Spain
- Died: 25 September 1858 (aged 67–68) New Orleans, United States
- Occupation: Politician

José Tiburcio López Constante (after 1790 – 25 September 1858) was governor of Yucatán, Mexico.

Yucatán's first constitution was promulgated in 1825. Antonio López de Santa Anna was removed as military commander of the area and immediately resigned as governor of Yucatán. At that point, López Constant was appointed by the Congress as the new governor. He took office on April 25, 1825 and the following May 3 issued the call for the first elections were to be held in Yucatan under the new constitution. After performing these on August 21 of that year, the legislature declared Yucatán José Tiburcio Lopez constant as governor for the next four years and Peter de Souza as vice-governor. Despite the national context's worry over the fight between federalists and centralists, the initial year under Lopez's leadership was generally tranquil. Fostered productive activities in the state, particularly those relating to the henequen industry then began to develop.

A decade later, in 1844, Lopez was again constant Yucatán governor to be appointed by Antonio López de Santa Anna, then president of Mexico, based on the provisions of the Organic Bases, 1843 governing the centralist Mexico then. The designation is given, however, in the context of emergency in which recognized the right to Yucatán to govern independently and free trade also occurring him, what had been a repeated approach the Yucatán since joining the republic .
