= 1848 in Mexico =

- Decades: 1820s; 1830s; 1840s; 1850s; 1860s
- See also: History of Mexico; List of years in Mexico; Timeline of Mexican history

Events in the year 1848 in Mexico.

== Incumbents ==
- President – Pedro María de Anaya
- President – Manuel de la Peña y Peña
- President – José Joaquín de Herrera

=== Governors ===
- Aguascalientes: Felipe Cosio
- Chiapas: Manuel María Parada/Jerónimo Cardona/Ponciano Solórzano del Barco/Fernando Nicolás Maldonado
- Chihuahua: Ángel Trías Álvarez/Laureano Muñoz Arregui/Ángel Trías Álvarez/Laureano Muñoz Arregui
- Coahuila: Eduardo González Laso
- Durango:
- Guanajuato:
- Jalisco: Joaquín Angulo González
- State of Mexico:
- Michoacán:
- Nuevo León: José María Parás
- Oaxaca:
- Puebla:
- Querétaro: Francisco de Paula Mesa
- San Luis Potosí:
- Sinaloa:
- Sonora:
- Tabasco:
- Tamaulipas: Jesús de Cárdenas
- Veracruz: Manuel Gutiérrez Zamora/José de Emparán/Manuel Gutiérrez Zamora
- Yucatán:
- Zacatecas:

== Events ==
- January 6 – Mexican General Antonio Gaona and his son are captured at the Battle of (sic)Napoluca (Nopalucan).
- January 22 to February 14 – A failed Mexican siege of Siege of San José del Cabo
- February 2 – The Treaty of Guadalupe Hidalgo is signed, ending the war and ceding to the United States virtually all of what is today the southwest of that country.
- March 16 – Battle of Santa Cruz de Rosales in Chihuahua
- March 31 – Lt. Col. Henry Stanton Burton defeated Mexican forces in Baja California Sur
- May 30 – Treaty of Guadalupe Hidalgo takes effect with the United States
- Peralta massacre

== Notable births ==
- January 26 – Justo Sierra (writer)
