= 1836 in Mexico =

- Decades: 1810s; 1820s; 1830s; 1840s; 1850s
- See also: History of Mexico; List of years in Mexico; Timeline of Mexican history

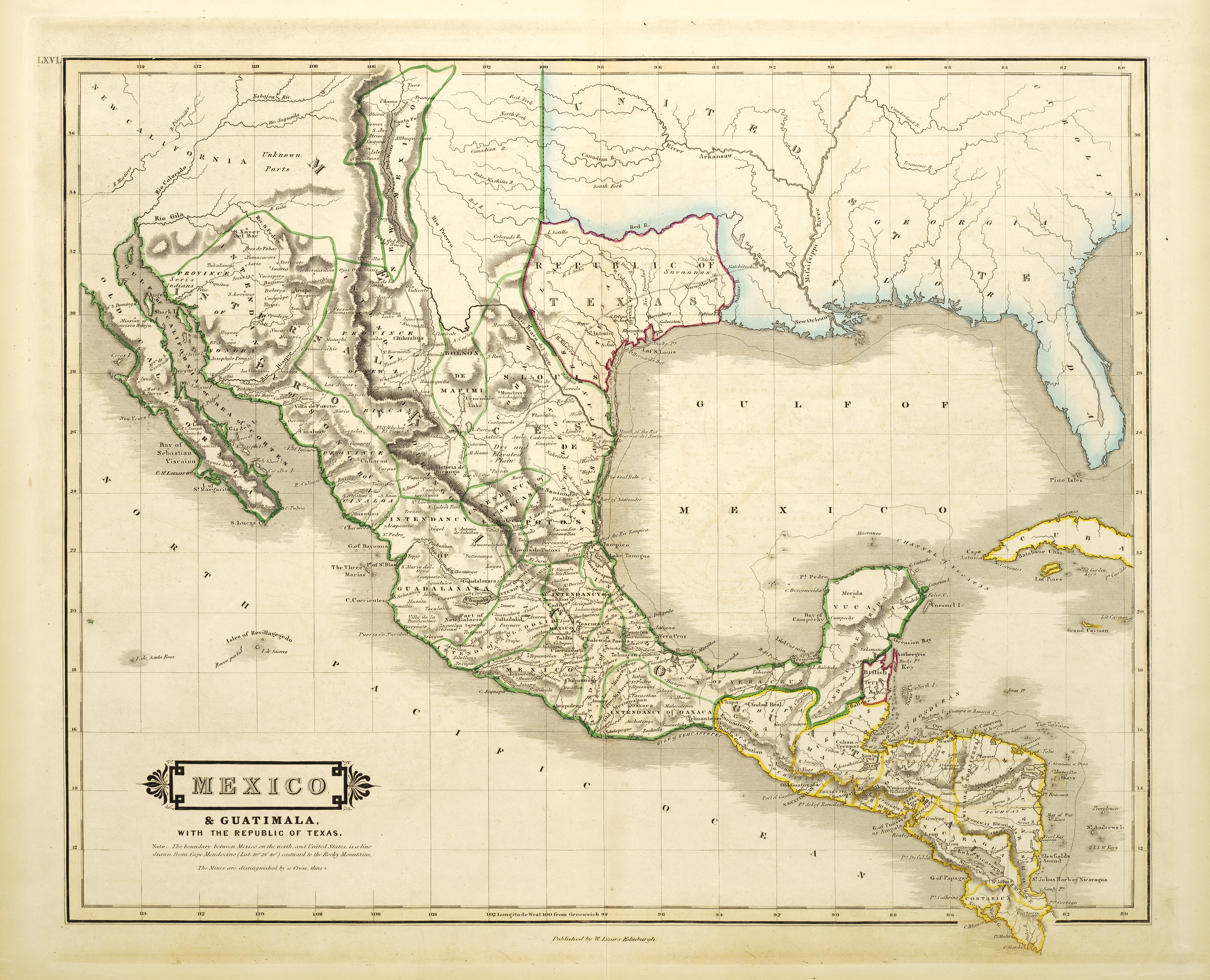
Map of Mexico in 1836

Events in the year 1836 in Mexico.

== Incumbents ==
- Miguel Barragán – President of Mexico until resignation due to illness February 27
- José Justo Corro – President of Mexico starting on March 2

=== Governors ===
- Aguascalientes: Pedro García Rojas
- Chiapas: Mariano Montes de Oca/Clemente Aceituno
- Chihuahua:
- Coahuila: José Rafael Eça y Múzquiz
- Durango:
- Guanajuato:
- Guerrero:
- Jalisco: José Antonio Romero/Antonio Escobedo
- State of Mexico:
- Michoacán:
- Nuevo León: Juan Nepomuceno de la Garza y Evía/Joaquín García
- Oaxaca:
- Puebla:
- Querétaro: José Rafael Canalizo
- San Luis Potosí:
- Sinaloa:
- Sonora:
- Tabasco:
- Tamaulipas: José Antonio Fernández Izaguirre/José Guadalupe de Samano
- Veracruz:
- Yucatán:
- Zacatecas:

== Events ==
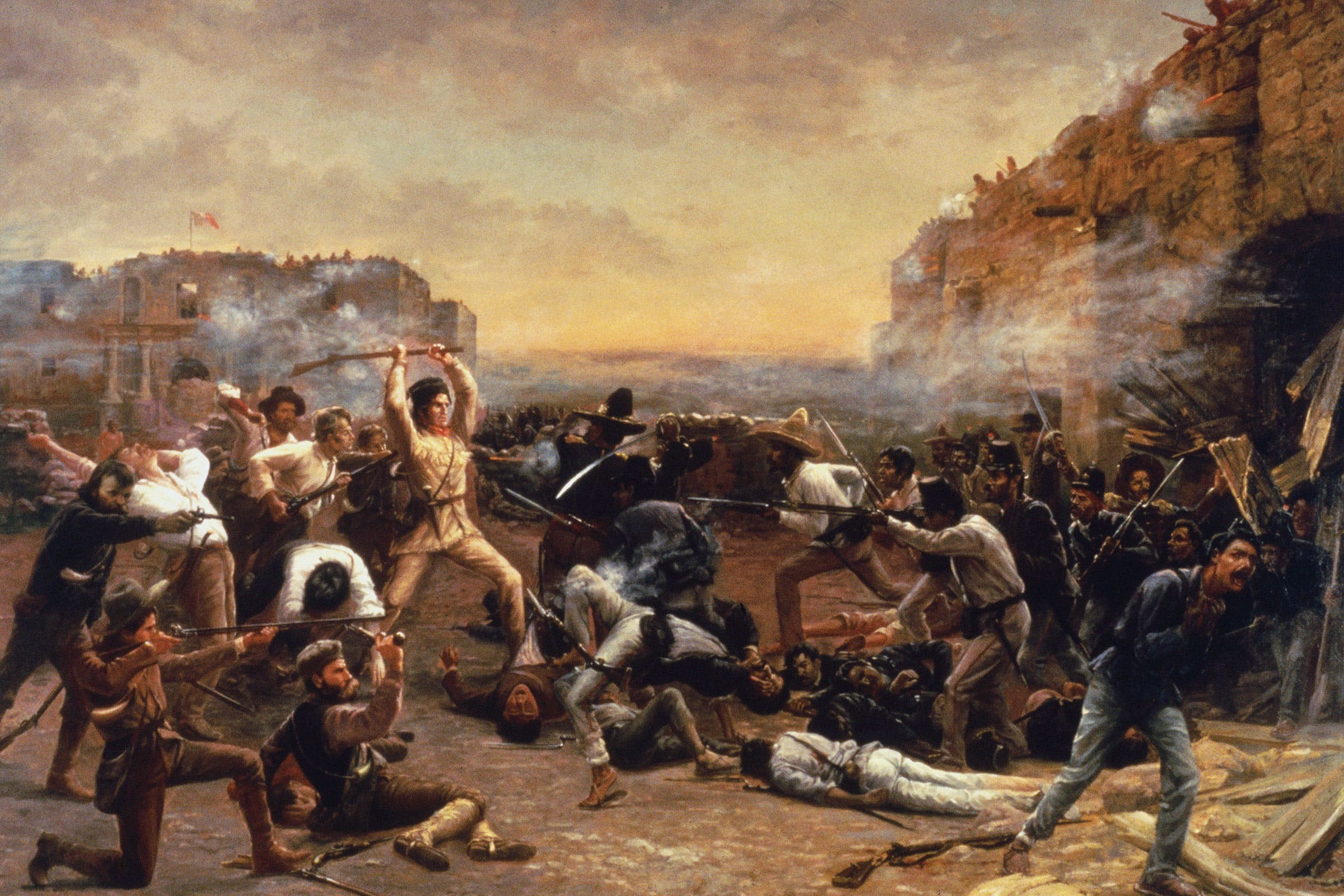
February 23–March 6: Battle of the Alamo

- February 23 – Battle of the Alamo: The siege of the Alamo begins in San Antonio, Texas.
- March 2 – At the Convention of 1836, the Republic of Texas declares independence from Mexico.
- March 6 – The Battle of the Alamo ends; 189 Texans are slaughtered by about 1,600 Mexicans.
- March 27 – Texas Revolution: Goliad massacre – Antonio López de Santa Anna orders the Mexican army to kill about 400 Texans at Goliad, Texas
- April 21 – Texas Revolution: Battle of San Jacinto – Republic of Texas forces under Sam Houston defeat troops under Mexican General Antonio López de Santa Anna. (Santa Anna and hundreds of his troops are taken prisoner along the San Jacinto River the next day.)
- April 22 – Texas Revolution: A day after the Battle of San Jacinto, forces under Texas General Sam Houston capture Mexican General Antonio López de Santa Anna.

== Notable births ==
- May 16 – Juan de la Luz Enríquez, Governor of Veracruz (died 1892)
- June 9 – Manuel de Aspiroz, statesman, Senator, and diplomat was born in Puebla, Puebla (died 1905)

== Notable deaths ==
- March 1 – Miguel Barragán, President of Mexico (born 1789)
