= Governor Pacheco =

Governor Pacheco may refer to:

- Enrique Dávila Pacheco (15??–1663), Acting Governor of Yucatán, Governor of Nueva Vizcaya and Governor of Tlaxcala
- Ivonne Ortega Pacheco (born 1972), Governor of Yucatán from 2007 to 2012
- José Condungua Pacheco (born 1958), Governor of Cabo Delgado Province, Mozambique, from 1998 to 2005
- Romualdo Pacheco (1831–1899), 12th Governor of California
- Rondon Pacheco (1919–2016), Governor of Minas Gerais, Brazil, from 1971 to 1975
- Víctor Cervera Pacheco (1936–2004), Governor of Yucatán from 1984 to 1988

== See also ==
- Alonso de Pacheco de Herédia (fl. 1640s), 12th Spanish Governor of New Mexico
