= 1835 in Mexico =

- Decades: 1810s; 1820s; 1830s; 1840s; 1850s
- See also: History of Mexico; List of years in Mexico; Timeline of Mexican history

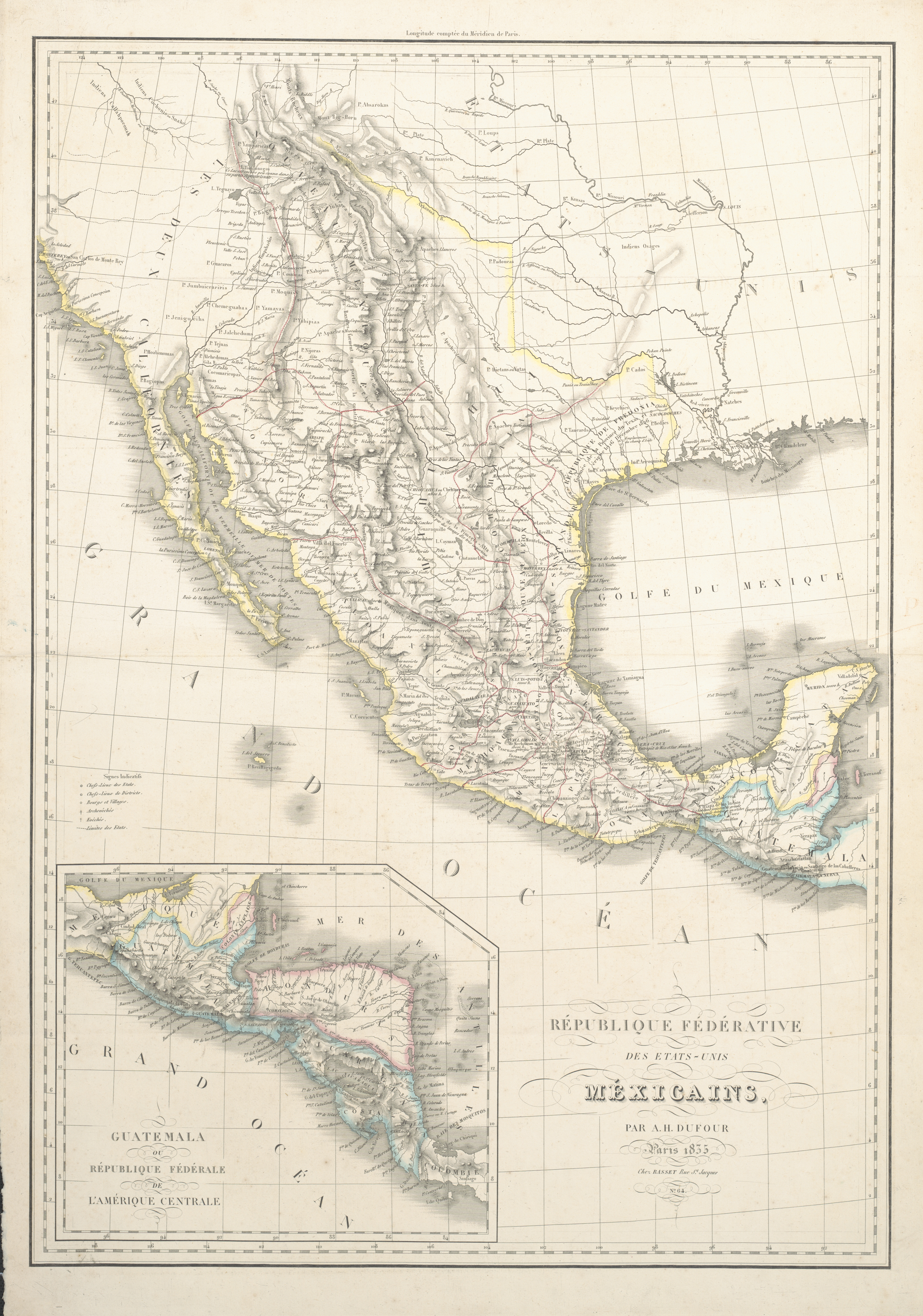
Map of Mexico in 1835

Events in the year 1835 in Mexico.

== Incumbents ==
- Antonio López de Santa Anna – President of Mexico, until 27 January
- Miguel Barragán – President of Mexico, 28 January until 27 February 1836

=== Governors ===
- Aguascalientes: Pedro García Rojas
- Chiapas: Mariano Montes de Oca
- Chihuahua: José Joaquín Calvo/José María Echavarría/José Joaquín Calvo
- Coahuila: Juan José Elguézabal/José María Cantú/Marcial Borrego/Agustín Viesca y Montes/José Miguel Falcón/Bartolomé de Cárdenas/José Rafael Eça y Múzquiz
- Durango:
- Guanajuato:
- Guerrero:
- Jalisco: José Antonio Romero
- State of Mexico:
- Michoacán:
- Nuevo León: Juan Nepomuceno de la Garza y Evía/Joaquín García
- Oaxaca:
- Puebla:
- Querétaro: José Rafael Canalizo
- San Luis Potosí:
- Sinaloa:
- Sonora:
- Tabasco:
- Tamaulipas: Juan Nepomuceno de la Garza y Evía/José Guadalupe de Samano/José Antonio Fernández Izaguirre
- Veracruz:
- Yucatán:
- Zacatecas:

== Events ==
- March 23 – The Mexican Academy of Language is established.
- May 23 – President Santa Anna separates by decree the State of Aguascalientes from the State of Zacatecas.
- October 2 – Texas Revolution – Battle of Gonzales: Mexican soldiers attempt to disarm the people of Gonzales, Texas but encounter stiff resistance from a hastily assembled militia.
- October 23 – The base for a Centralist Constitution is promulgated, giving birth to the Siete Leyes and establishing a Central Power overlooking the other three Powers of the Union.
- December 9 – The Army of the Republic of Texas captures San Antonio.

== Notable births ==
- november 8 – Concepción Lombardo, wife of Miguel Miramon, who served twice as President of Mexico between 1859 and 1860 (d. 1921)
- November 30 – Eligio Ancona del Castillo, lawyer, professor, journalist, historian, dramaturge, novelist and revolutionary politic, is born in Mérida, Yucatán.

== Notable deaths ==
- September 9 – José Figueroa, Governor of Alta California (born 1792)

=== Dates unknown ===
- Pedro Patiño Ixtolinque, sculptor who worked on the Puebla Cathedral and the Mexico City Metropolitan Cathedral (born 1774)
- Vicente Francisco de Sarría, Franciscan missionary to Alta California (born 1767)
- José Félix Trespalacios, first Governor of Coahuila y Tejas and also a Senator from Chihuahua
