= Fuenmayor (surname) =

Fuenmayor is a Spanish surname. Notable people with the surname include:

- Denisse Fuenmayor (born 1979), Venezuelan softball player
- Johana Fuenmayor, Venezuelan fencer
- Juan Fuenmayor (born 1979), Venezuelan footballer
- Manuel Fuenmayor (born 1980), Venezuelan javelin thrower
- Ruy Fernández de Fuenmayor (1603–1651), Spanish soldier and colonial governor
