= Carlos Berlín Montero =

Mexican politician

Jorge Carlos Berlín Montero
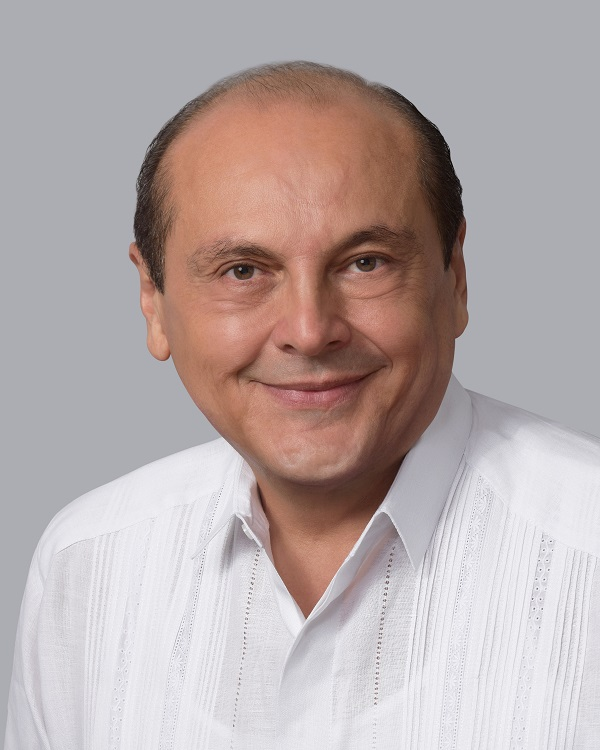
- Born: December 10, 1956 (age 69); Calotmul, Yucatán, Mexico
- Occupation: Politician
- Political party: PRI

Jorge Carlos Berlín Montero (born December 10, 1956) is a Mexican politician from the Institutional Revolutionary Party (PRI). In the 2000 general election he was elected to the Chamber of Deputies to represent the first district of Yucatán.
