= List of presidents of the Republic of Yucatán =

President of the Republic of Yucatán
- Flag of the Republic of Yucatán
- Government of Yucatán
- Member of: Congress of Yucatán
- Appointer: Direct popular election
- Constituting instrument: Constitution of Yucatán
- Precursor: President of Mexico
- Formation: March 16, 1841
- First holder: Santiago Méndez Ibarra
- Final holder: Miguel Barbachano y Tarrazo
- Abolished: July 14, 1848
- Superseded by: President of Mexico

This is a list of the presidents of the Republic of Yucatán during two periods of the nineteenth century. The first Republic of Yucatán, founded May 29, 1823, willingly joined the Mexican federation as the Federated Republic of Yucatán on December 23, 1823, less than seven months later. The second Republic of Yucatán began in 1841, with its declaration of independence from the Mexican Federation. It remained independent for 7 years, after which it rejoined the Mexican Federation.

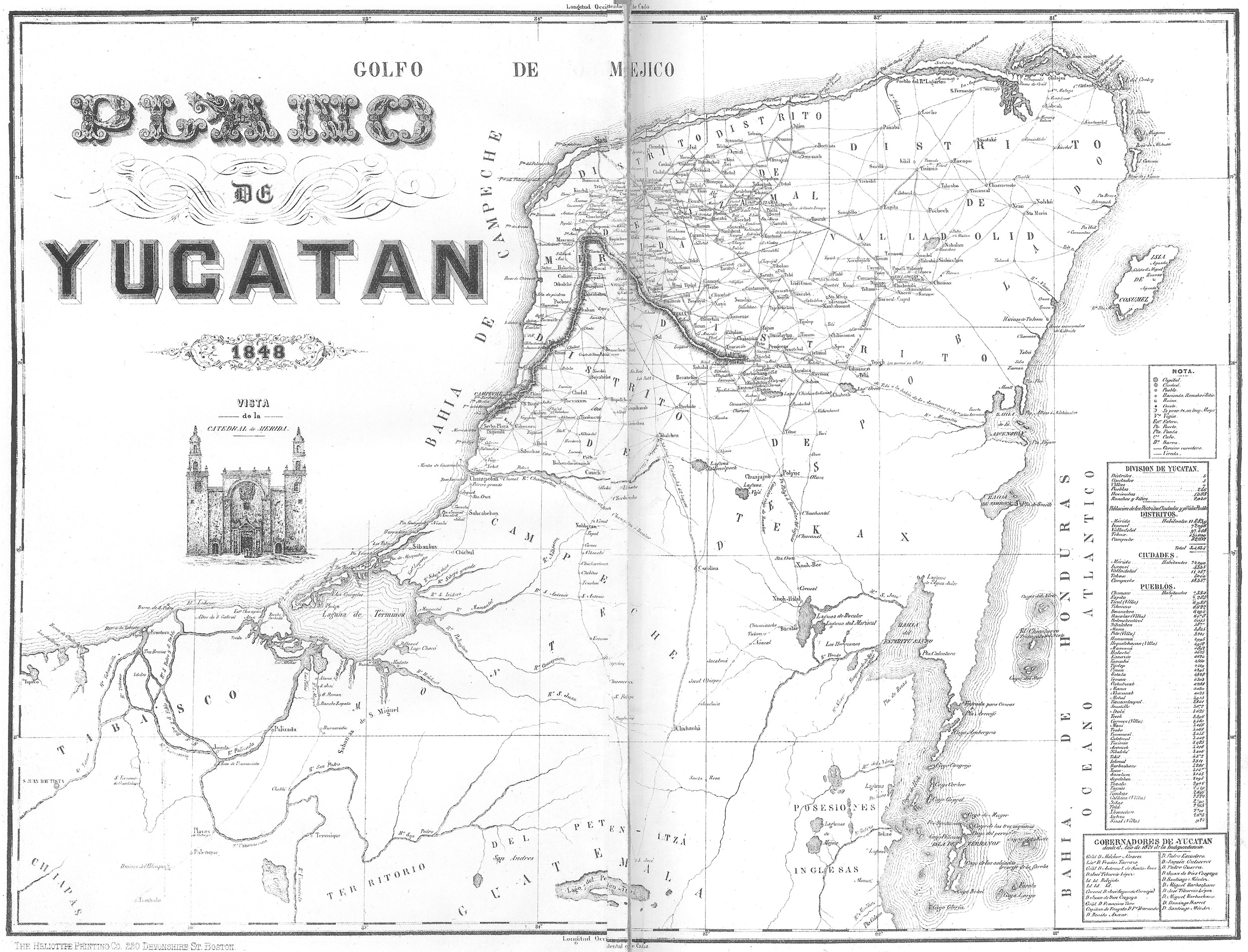
Map of the Republic of Yucatán

== Officeholders ==
No.	Portrait	Name (born–died)	Term of office			Ref.
No.	Portrait	Name (born–died)	Took office	Left office	Time in office	Ref.
1		Santiago Méndez Ibarra	August 22, 1840	December 11, 1841		
2		Miguel Barbachano y Tarrazo	December 11, 1841	October 13, 1842		
(1)		Santiago Méndez Ibarra	October 13, 1842	August 18, 1842		
(2)		Miguel Barbachano y Tarrazo	August 18, 1842	November 14, 1843		
(1)		Santiago Méndez Ibarra	November 14, 1843	May 15, 1844		
(2)		Miguel Barbachano y Tarrazo	May 15, 1844	June 2, 1844		
3		José Tiburcio López Constante	June 2, 1844	January 1, 1846		
(2)		Miguel Barbachano y Tarrazo	January 1, 1846	January 21, 1847		
4		Domingo Barret Echeverri	January 21, 1847	October 3, 1847		
(1)		Santiago Méndez Ibarra	October 3, 1847	March 26, 1847		
(2)		Miguel Barbachano y Tarrazo	March 26, 1847	July 14, 1848		
