= Francisco Núñez Melián =

Governor of Venezuela
- In office 1630–1637
- Preceded by: Juan de Meneses y Padilla
- Succeeded by: Ruy Fernández de Fuenmayor

Governor of Yucatán
- In office 1643–1644
- Preceded by: Diego Zapata de Cárdenas
- Succeeded by: Enrique Dávila Pacheco (interim)

Personal details
- Born: Unknown Madrid, Spain
- Died: 1644 Mérida, Yucatán, Mexico

Francisco Núñez Melián (died 13 April 1644) was a Spanish adventurer and royal administrator born in Madrid.

By 1619, Melián had become a member of the Havana city council. He also held the prominent post of treasurer for the Windward Islands region of the Santa Cruzada, a fund that managed the alms given by the faithful for indulgences and the support of the church.

In 1624, after initial attempts to salvage the ships of the 1622 Tierra Firme (South American) Fleet had failed, he was granted license by King Philip IV to search for the wrecks of the Nuestra Señora de Atocha and Santa Margarita. He sent a crew to the area in 1625, but they vanished at sea.

In 1626, he led an expedition to locate the wrecks of the two ships Nuestra Señora de Atocha and Santa Margarita. On 3 June 1626 one of his slaves, Casta Bañon, discovered the wreck of Santa Margarita.

He was Governor of Venezuela from 1630 to 1637. Between 1643 and 1644 he was Governor of Yucatán, appointed by Philip IV of Spain. He died while in office on 13 April 1644.

Preceded by Juan de Meneses y Padilla	Governor of Venezuela; 1630–1637	Succeeded by Ruy Fernández de Fuenmayor
Preceded by Diego Zapata de Cárdenas	Governor of Yucatán; 1643–1644	Succeeded by Enrique Dávila Pacheco (interim)
