= William Renán Sosa Altamira =

Mexican politician

- Born: 21 April 1957 (age 69)
- Occupation: Politician
- Political party: PRI

William Renán Sosa Altamira (born 21 April 1957) is a Mexican politician affiliated with the Institutional Revolutionary Party (PRI). In the 2012 general election he was elected to the Chamber of Deputies to represent the first district of Yucatán during the 62nd Congress.
