= Juan Pío Manzano =

Mexican physician and politician

Juan Pío Manzano Fajardo (c. 1817–1901) was a Mexican physician and politician, who was born and died in Valladolid, Yucatán. He was governor of Yucatán from 1889 to 1890.
