= 1st federal electoral district of Yucatán =

Federal electoral district of Mexico

Yucatán's 1st
- Electoral district of the Chamber of Deputies of Mexico

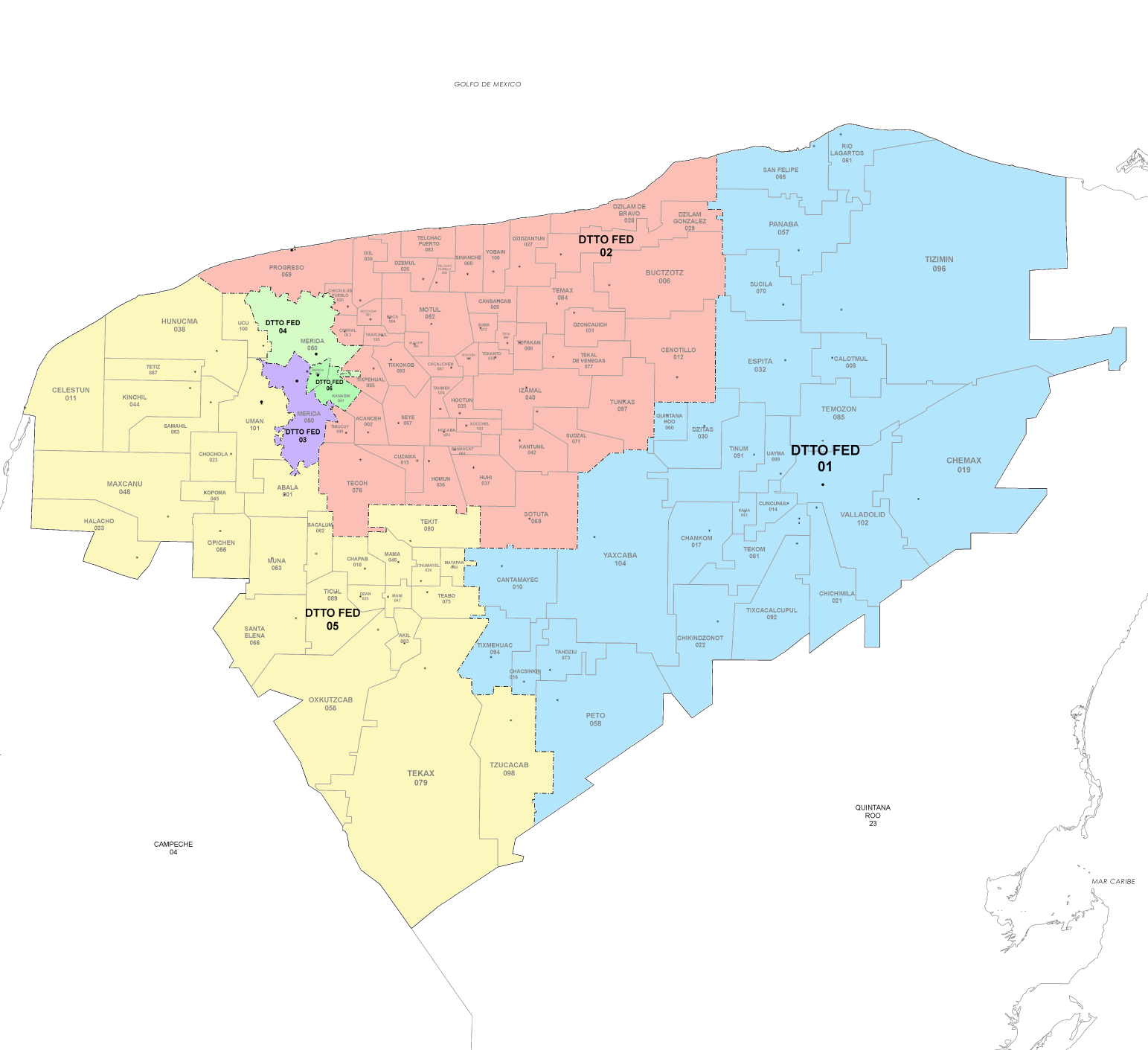
- 1st district since 2023

Incumbent
- Member: Rocío Barrera Puc
- Party: ▌Morena
- Congress: 66th (2024–2027)

District
- State: Yucatán
- Head town: Valladolid
- Coordinates: 20°41′N 88°12′W
- Covers: 27 municipalities: Cantamayec, Yaxcabá, Cuncunul, Chacsinkín, Chankom, Chemax, Chichimilá, Chikindzonot, Dzitás, Espita, Kaua, Panabá, Peto, Quintana Roo, Río Lagartos, San Felipe, Sucilá, Tahdziú, Calotmul, Tekom, Temozón, Tinum, Tixcacalcupul, Tixméhuac, Tizimín, Uayma, Valladolid
- PR region: Third
- Precincts: 197
- Population: 376,469 (2020 census)
- Indigenous: Yes (84%)

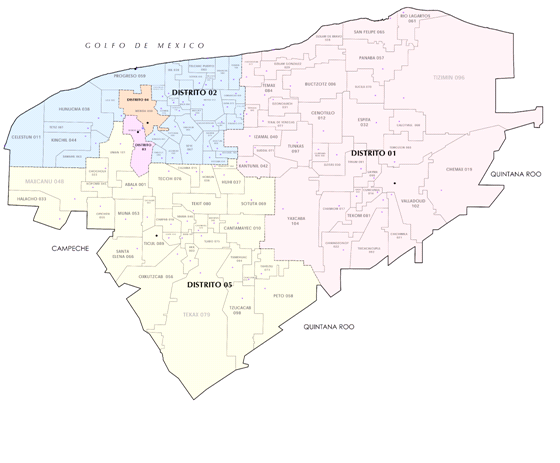
Yucatán under the 2017–2022 districting plan

1st district in 2005–2017

The 1st federal electoral district of Yucatán (Spanish: Distrito electoral federal 01 de Yucatán) is one of the 300 electoral districts into which Mexico is divided for elections to the federal Chamber of Deputies and one of six such districts in the state of Yucatán.

It elects one deputy to the lower house of Congress for each three-year legislative period by means of the first-past-the-post system. Votes cast in the district also count towards the calculation of proportional representation ("plurinominal") deputies elected from the third region.

The current member for the district, elected in the 2024 general election, is Rocío Natali Barrera Puc of the National Regeneration Movement (Morena).

== District territory ==
Yucatán gained a congressional seat in the 2023 redistricting process carried out by the National Electoral Institute (INE). Under the new districting plan, which is to be used for the 2024, 2027 and 2030 federal elections, the first district is located in the east and south-east of the state. It comprises 197 electoral precincts (secciones electorales) across 27 municipalities:

- Cantamayec, Yaxcabá, Cuncunul, Chacsinkín, Chankom, Chemax, Chichimilá, Chikindzonot, Dzitás, Espita, Kaua, Panabá, Peto, Quintana Roo, Río Lagartos, San Felipe, Sucilá, Tahdziú, Calotmul, Tekom, Temozón, Tinum, Tixcacalcupul, Tixméhuac, Tizimín, Uayma and Valladolid.

The head town (cabecera distrital), where results from individual polling stations are gathered together and tallied, is the city of Valladolid. The district had a population of 376,469 in the 2020 census and, with Indigenous and Afrodescendent inhabitants accounting for over 84% of that total, Yucatán's first – like all the state's electoral districts, both local and federal – is classified by the INE as an indigenous district. (Note: Total inhabitants, not voters. The INE deems any local or federal electoral district where Indigenous or Afrodescendent inhabitants number 40% or more of the population to be an indigenous district.)

== Previous districting schemes ==
Evolution of electoral district numbers
	1974	1978	1996	2005	2017	2023
Yucatán	3	4	5	5	5	6
Chamber of Deputies	196	300				

2017–2022

Between 1996 and 2022, Yucatán had five federal electoral districts. Under the 2017 scheme, the first district's head town was at Valladolid and it covered 35 municipalities in the east of the state:
- Buctzotz, Calotmul, Cenotillo, Cuncunul, Chankom, Chemax, Chichimilá, Chikindzonot, Dzinzantún, Dzilam de Bravo, Dzilam González, Dzitás, Dzoncauich, Espita, Izamal, Kantunil, Kaua, Panabá, Quintana Roo, Río Lagartos, San Felipe, Sucilá, Sudzal, Tekal de Venegas, Tekom, Temax, Temozón, Tepakán, Tinum, Tixcacalcupul, Tizimín, Tunkás, Uayma, Valladolid and Yaxcabá.

2005–2017

Under the 2005 districting scheme, the district covered 33 municipalities in the east and south-east portions of the state and had its head town at Valladolid.

1996–2005

Between 1996 and 2005, the district's head town was at Valladolid and it covered 35 municipalities in an area broadly similar to its 2005 configuration, but with more of the northern coast and less of the south-eastern border with the state of Quintana Roo.

1978–1996

The districting scheme in force from 1978 to 1996 was the result of the 1977 electoral reforms, which increased the number of single-member seats in the Chamber of Deputies from 196 to 300. Under that plan, Yucatán's district allocation rose from three to four. The first district had its head town at the state capital, Mérida, and it covered a portion of that city.

== Deputies returned to Congress ==
(Mexico) National parties
- Current
- PAN
- PRI
- PT
- PVEM
- MC
- Morena
- PAZ
- Somos
- Defunct or local only
- PLM
- PNR
- PRM
- PNM
- PP
- PPS
- PARM
- PFCRN
- CON
- PANAL
- PSD
- PES
- PES
- PRD

Yucatán's 1st district
Election	Deputy	Party	Term	Legislature
1973	Víctor Cervera Pacheco	Institutional Revolutionary Party	1973–1976	49th Congress
1976	Mirna Hoyos de Navarrete	Institutional Revolutionary Party	1976–1979	50th Congress
1979	Federico Granja Ricalde	Institutional Revolutionary Party	1979–1982	51st Congress
1982	Víctor Cervera Pacheco; Herbé Rodríguez Abraham	Institutional Revolutionary Party	1982–1984; 1984–1985	52nd Congress
1985	Rodolfo Antonio Menéndez	Institutional Revolutionary Party	1985–1988	53rd Congress
1988	Ana Rosa Payán Cervera	National Action Party (Mexico)	1988–1991	54th Congress
1991	Luis Correa Mena	National Action Party (Mexico)	1991–1994	55th Congress
1994	Manuel Fuentes Alcocer	National Action Party (Mexico)	1994–1997	56th Congress
1997	Orlando Paredes Lara	Institutional Revolutionary Party	1997–2000	57th Congress
2000	Jorge Carlos Berlín Montero	Institutional Revolutionary Party	2000–2003	58th Congress
2003	Roger David Alcocer García	Institutional Revolutionary Party	2003–2006	59th Congress
2006	Joaquín Jesús Díaz Mena	National Action Party (Mexico)	2006–2009	60th Congress
2009	Liborio Vidal Aguilar	Ecologist Green Party of Mexico	2009–2012	61st Congress
2012	William Renan Sosa Altamira	Institutional Revolutionary Party	2012–2015	62nd Congress
2015	Liborio Vidal Aguilar	Institutional Revolutionary Party	2015–2018	63rd Congress
2018	Jesús Carlos Vidal Peniche	Institutional Revolutionary Party	2018–2021	64th Congress
2021	Sergio Chalé Cauich	National Action Party (Mexico)	2021–2024	65th Congress
2024	Rocío Natali Barrera Puc	National Regeneration Movement	2024–2027	66th Congress

== Presidential elections ==
Yucatán's 1st district
Election	District won by	Party or coalition	%
2018	Andrés Manuel López Obrador	Juntos Haremos Historia	35.3914
2024	Claudia Sheinbaum Pardo	Sigamos Haciendo Historia	64.7446
