= Justo Sierra O'Reilly =

Mexican novelist and historian (1814–1861)

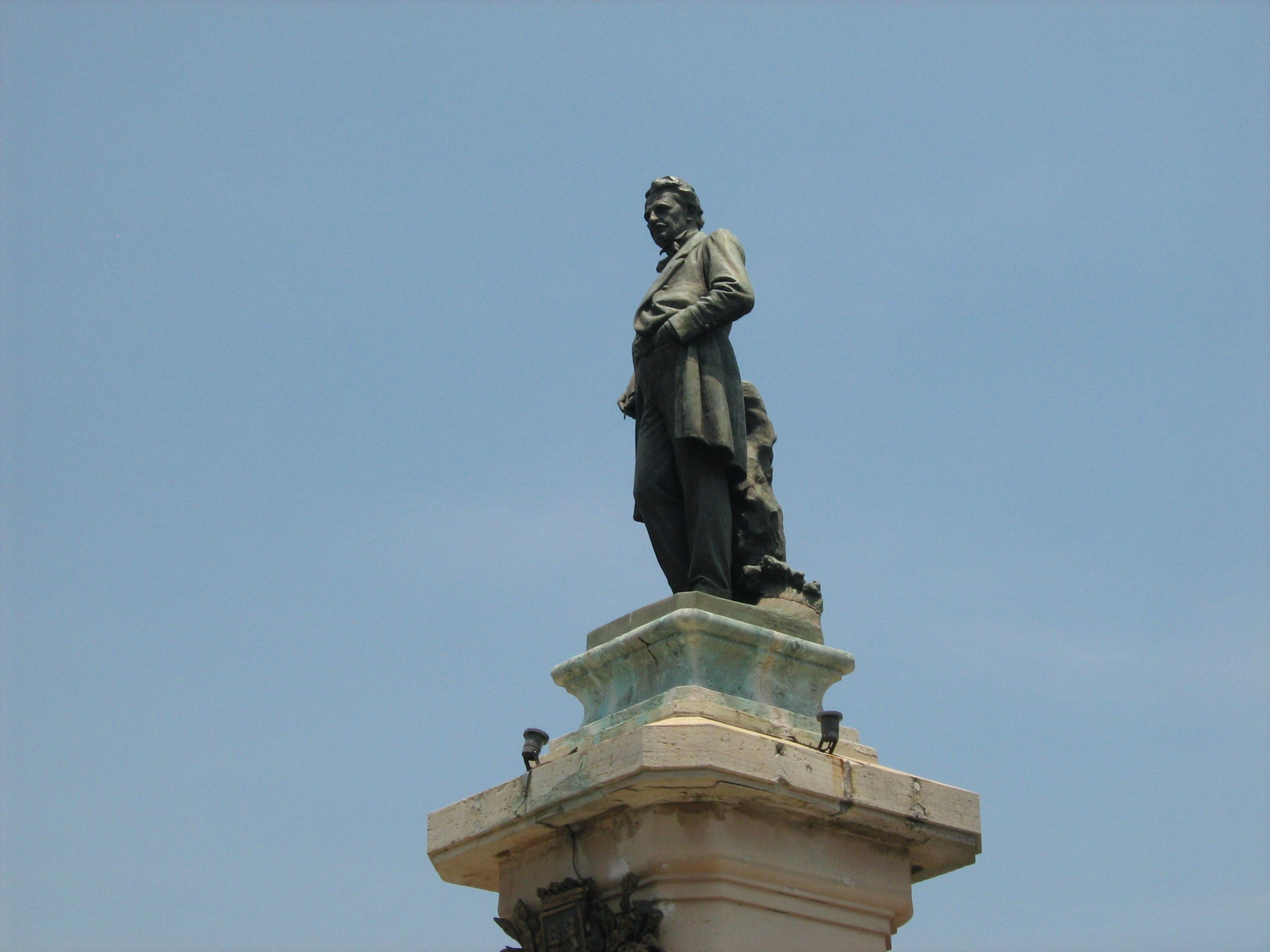
Monument in Mérida, Mexico

Justo Sierra O'Reilly (Tixcacal-Tuyú; September 24, 1814 – 1861) was a Mexican novelist and historian.

Sierra O'Reilly was born in the southeastern Mexican state of Yucatán, his father-in-law Santiago Méndez Ibarra was the governor there in 1847, in the middle of the Mexican–American War (in which the state of Yucatán declared its neutrality) and at the outbreak of the Caste War of Yucatán. In September of that year, he went to the United States as a negotiator on behalf of his father-in-law's government, to request U.S. military aid against the Maya rebels (who seemed, at that moment, poised to take over the peninsula), and to offer the possibility of U.S. annexation of Yucatán in exchange. His attempts at diplomacy on behalf of the quasi-independent peninsula went nowhere, and by the time he returned home in 1848, Mexico had lost the northern half of its territory to the U.S. but had also solved its differences with Yucatán, and Sierra O'Reilly found himself with an unemployed father-in-law and no government position for himself.

It was then, at the age of 34, that he turned to literature. The chapters of his popular melodramatic novel, La Hija del Judío, a historical novel in the style of Sir Walter Scott about the star-crossed love of the daughter of a Jewish merchant in colonial Mexico, were published in installments in El Fénix, a newspaper that he founded in Campeche. Published years later in book form, the novel sold well all over Latin America. His other works include the pirate novel El Filibustero, the travel journal Impresiones de un viaje a los Estados Unidos de América y al Canadá (1851), and numerous writings on the regional history of Yucatán such as Teogonía de los antiguos indios and Importancia de un Museo de Antigüedades, as well as Spanish translations of John Lloyd Stephens's works on Yucatán. He died in 1861 in Mérida.

He was the father of Mexican author and political figure Justo Sierra Méndez.

== See also ==
- Mexican literature
- Caste War

== Sources ==
- Breve historia de Campeche by Carlos Justo Sierra
- "Un James Bond Novohispano" from Revista Conciencia Online, Año 2, Número 7, noviembre de 2001
