= Enrique Dávila Pacheco =

Spanish royal ambassador and Governor

Governor Enrique Dávila Pacheco

Acting Governor of Yucatán
- In office 28 May 1644 – 4 December 1645
- Preceded by: Francisco Núñez Melián
- Succeeded by: Esteban de Azcárraga

Captain General of Yucatán
- In office 28 May 1644 – 4 December 1645
- Preceded by: Francisco Núñez Melián
- Succeeded by: Esteban de Azcárraga

Acting Governor of Yucatán
- In office 15 December 1648 – 19 October 1650
- Preceded by: Esteban de Azcárraga
- Succeeded by: García de Valdés y Osorio

Captain General of Yucatán
- In office 15 December 1648 – 19 October 1650
- Preceded by: Esteban de Azcárraga
- Succeeded by: García de Valdés y Osorio

Governor of Nueva Vizcaya
- In office 7 March 1653 – 1655

Governor of Tlaxcala (New Spain)
- In office 28 February 1662 – 7 January 1663

Personal details
- Born: Unknown Spain
- Died: 1663 New Spain
- Profession: Royal and General Manager; Governor
- II: XI; II: XIII

Enrique Dávila Pacheco (15?? – 1663) was a royal ambassador of Spain, Acting Governor and Captain General of Yucatán, Governor of Nueva Vizcaya and Governor of Tlaxcala. He was appointed to the position of Governor of Nueva Vizcaya by King Philip IV of Spain.

== Biography ==
Pacheco was appointed as the acting governor of Yucatán by García Sarmiento de Sotomayor, after the death of Francisco Núñez Melián, becoming the governor on 28 May 1644. He was appointed as the Governor of Nueva Vizcaya by Philip IV of Spain. According to the Encyclopedia Yucatán, during his brief administration (being an active governor), Pacheco visited every province in New Spain except Tabasco. He instituted important practical measures for Maya peoples and the expulsion from Spanish settlements of certain speculators and smugglers who were benefiting through stealing from the indigenous people of Mexico.

In September 1644, there was a possible landing of English pirates under the command of privateer James Jackson, who reached the coast of Campeche with thirteen vessels and over a thousand men. There was early intervention by the villagers, which was ordered and supervised by Governor Davila. The villagers discouraged the attackers to continue southwards, landing in Champotón, a less protected port. This meant that some booty pirates went to Champotón, as almost the entire population had left the port. They managed to capture a group of indigenous people and two Spanish missionaries, who they stripped of their belongings. Along with their hostages, the pirates sailed away, where they became victims of bad weather which capsized several boats, making the captured group survive. They arrived battered in Cuba, and later returned to Yucatán.

Pacheco ruled the province peacefully and in harmony with its inhabitants. Field master Esteban de Azcárraga unexpectedly appeared in San Francisco de Campeche, disguised as a boy and carrying the royal sheets that accredited him. Azcárraga had been appointed (to do this) by Philip IV of Spain of Spain. Pacheco immediately made arrangements to give power to the newcomer, who took office on 4 December 1645. At that point, Enrique Davila returned to Mexico City. Azcárraga later died three years later (1648) as a victim of a lethal epidemic plague that struck the Yucatán peninsula in 1648.

On 28 February 1662, viceroy Juan de Leyva de la Cerda, conde de Baños was appointed governor of the city and province Tlaxcala. Pacheco was replaced as Mayor of Mexico City a year later on January 7, 1663 due to his death. He was replaced by Manuel Sotomayor.
