= Liborio Vidal Aguilar =

Mexican politician

- Born: 27 April 1963 (age 63); Valladolid, Yucatán, Mexico
- Occupation: Politician
- Political party: Morena (2026–present)
- Other political affiliations: Institutional Revolutionary Party (1990–2001, 2015-2021); Party of the Democratic Revolution (2001–2009); Ecologist Green Party of Mexico (2009–2015); National Action Party (2021–2026)

Liborio Vidal Aguilar (born 27 April 1963) is a Mexican politician from Morena. As a member of the Institutional Revolutionary Party, he served in the Chamber of Deputies representing the first federal electoral district of Yucatán in 2009–2012 and again in 2015–2018.

== Life ==
Vidal broke into politics in 1990 when he became the president of the PRI in his hometown of Valladolid, Yucatán. The next year, he was elected municipal president, a capacity in which he served until 1993. That year, he also began the first in a string of tenures as a business leader, in a family business known as Proveedora del Hogar Vidal, S.A. de C.V.

From 1994 to 1995 and again between 1998 and 2001, Vidal served as a local deputy in the 53rd and 55 sessions of the Congress of Yucatán. In between, he was the state subsecretary of government and simultaneously served as a state political councilor. Meanwhile, between 1996 and 1999, he was the founder and director general of another business, Bodega Mayorista del Sureste, S.A. de C.V. (Bomssa). Bomssa was based in Mérida, with branches in Comitán, Cancún and Coatzacoalcos. In 1999, he shifted to directing Proveedora Mueblera Vidal, S.A. de C.V., a position he held for eight years. During this time, from 2001 to 2003, Vidal served as the vice president of the chamber of commerce of Valladolid. During this time, Vidal also jumped from the PRI to join the Party of the Democratic Revolution (PRD); he and several other former members of the PRI in Yucatán rejoined the party in 2007.

For a time in 2007, Vidal was the state secretary of social development; between 2008 and 2009, he was the secretary of community social policy. In 2009, voters elected Vidal to the federal legislature for the first time, as a deputy to the 61st Congress. He sat as part of the Ecologist Green Party of Mexico (PVEM) faction and was the secretary of the Social Development Commission. Vidal also participated on commissions dealing with agriculture, fishing, and southern border matters.

In 2015, the PRI ran Vidal as its candidate for the district 1 seat and sent him back to San Lázaro for the 63rd Congress. He was the secretary on the Southern/Southeastern Border Matters Commission and also serves on those dealing with Culture and Film, as well as Tourism.

For most of the last 25 years, beginning with his tenure as municipal president of Valladolid, Vidal has donated his statutory salary from his various government positions for charitable purposes, a tradition he continued in 2016 by donating $86,000 per month, stating that he earns enough from his business ventures. For the first time, in 2016, citizens got to choose to which priority areas Vidal's donation would be directed, selecting medicine for low-income children, environmental education, and homes for the elderly.
