= Roger Alcocer =

Mexican politician

- Born: 18 June 1966 (age 59); Valladolid, Yucatán, Mexico
- Occupation: Politician
- Political party: PRI

Roger David Alcocer García (born 18 June 1966) is a Mexican politician affiliated with the Institutional Revolutionary Party (PRI). In the 2003 mid-terms he was elected to the Chamber of Deputies to represent the first district of Yucatán during the 59th Congress.
