= Santiago Imán =

Santiago Imán was a Creole revolutionary involved in a series of events that led to, and helped cause, the Caste War of Yucatán and was born in 1800. Through 1839 to 1840, starting on May 29, he led a revolt which helped push the Yucatán's separation from Mexico, which was currently going through tough problems after the Pastry War with France and was also having difficulty, and weakness, regaining territory lost to the U.S., including Texas. He encouraged Federalism in the Yucatán once Mexican independence came and Spanish rule was eliminated. He was higher up in the caste like system at the time as a merchant Creole who owned land in the city of Tizimín. The Centralized Mexican government at the time was becoming more frustrated, in need of men to reconquer Texas from the United States, and sought to gather soldiers by being more oppressive to this deed. Imán knew that his best bet was to gather the Mayan peoples that resided in the Yucatán to aide in forming Yucatán as an independent nation. He gained their devotion by promising the abolition of Church taxes, which the Mayan people for obvious religious reasons didn't appreciate, and with his ambition and the motivation on the heads of the Mayan peasantry they momentarily drove Independence for the Yucatán till 1843; later Independence periods where brought in a few following years up until 1848 where they were quenched once and for all. His drive brought many social changes including the disuse of public lands, and new forms of awarding individuals for many forms of service mostly including military work. His actions would later drive and motivate more Creole revolutions notably the Caste War of Yucatán in 1847.

== Life to 1839 ==
According to Terry Rugeley, of Oklahoma University, Imán was born to a well-to-do family with his patriarchal father who was a real estate agent, whom also served on many political positions in The Oriente (Ecuador) named Fraustino Imán, in 1800. Following in his fathers footsteps he attained property, wealth, and power. His most successful prowess was in his military career where he attained the rank of Captain and had served on his battalion for more than 25 years. He and his battalion helped Caudillos on their payrolls and also their safety. Despite his success in the Texas Wars proved as a disaster and he was immediately seen as a Villain. He started conspiracies to save himself after that were threatening to the central government of Mexico who then put him in Jail in 1836. After this his heart was set on an all-out rebellion.

== Social chaos ==
Imán brought much social chaos during his rebellions with his some Five to Seven Hundred men at first and led violence across the town of Tizimín and surrounding area until many more people become absorbed into the all out drive against the central government. The Church was looked on as the prime target by the peoples, most of whom were Mayans. He forced many to sign his Federalist Pronouncement then fortified the city in wait for the central government's retaliation. The forces came and were much more of a force to be reckoned with than the churches in Tizimín. Imán was forced to retreat and continued in his attempts to get Mayan's on his side in other places. His philosophical approach to succeed using Mayans was the example he received from past men like Antonio Guemez. He progressively gained more power until it had spread to the whole peninsula.

== Capture of Valladolid and Yucatán Independence ==
He eventually led his Federalist army to Valladolid where they were able to capture the city in 1840. After which he wrote a declaration that (Translated to English, to see a picture of original document click here)

FELLOW.

The ruling protects the cause of freedom: the brave troops under my command have already taken possession of this city, Valladolid has emerged from slavery, abjection and disgrace.

I have the pleasure to introduce myself among this worthy people, and I am satisfied that there will be known, in me, the character of a proud victor, but the friendliness of a peaceful citizen: to win the laurels of that victory brings, I preferred the olive of peace, with this I invite you to accompany the minutes of the delivery of this heroic people, and do not believe the horrible blow of the gun is necessary for you out of your slumber, because I am convinced this fraternal hint will be enough to revive in your breasts, the patriotic feelings that motivate you for the just cause I maintain.

FELLOW CITIZENS: even when circumstances demand it, my heart melts to send a shot to my brothers, whose existence is very noticeable to me, everyone is Yucatecan, we are all children of a common mother, we despedacemos inmolándonos each other: by me part declare to you I just wanna shake the sacred bonds that unite us via positive covenants, and to restore the general code of the nation, and particularly the state, which set out to ensure a stable way, the social goods that emanate from them, and identify our interests with the rest of Mexico, to swear to belong: Lay down, then, ominous warnings that cause matter to tyranny, our object is not shirk of obedience to the Supreme Government, but wait for the moment happy giving away their respectable provisions, so after deign give the general clamor of the people: if you speak nceramente, while I assure you that never take you to your homes the devastation, death and pillage. No, countrymen, people who have occupied the troops under my command, I swear to heaven that they are not the bloody and shameful vestiges of depredation and plunder: even if my personal enemies have sought infamarme, can not take my satisfaction to say that in defending the rights of the country, I have religiously respected the properties, have protected the people, and I have not missed the guarantees and assurances I have given, as in more serious circumstances, perhaps imprudence will most shamelessly ollado sacred commitments, respected even less educated people than ours: fortunately we can not be blamed to act as shameful and depressing: so your rest assured that the properties and people, will be for my inviolable.

For the record you will see established a Supreme Power, but its powers are limited to protect your rights under the code demarcates powers to the Governor of the State: the existence of this corporation respectable, whose decrees will be given away religiously, is in my concept a clear testimony of my desire for your welfare, my respect for the sovereignty of the people and the sincerity of my wishes for the restoration of the federal system to do the happiness of my country, whose interests to draw the sword, made the sacrifice of his repose and existence, your fellow citizen and friend. Valladolid February 12, 1840.

Santiago Iman.

Six days later, Imán, as a Captain, declared the Yucatán Peninsula as Independent.

Santiago continued to lead as a "Brigaider General" in the following years including the retaliation attempts by the Central government and would reside in the minds of Yucatán citizens, progressing intensely into the Caste Wars in 1847.

== See also ==
- History of Mexico
- List of wars involving Mexico
- History of the Yucatán
- Republic of Yucatán
