= Santiago Méndez =

Mexican politician (1798–1872)

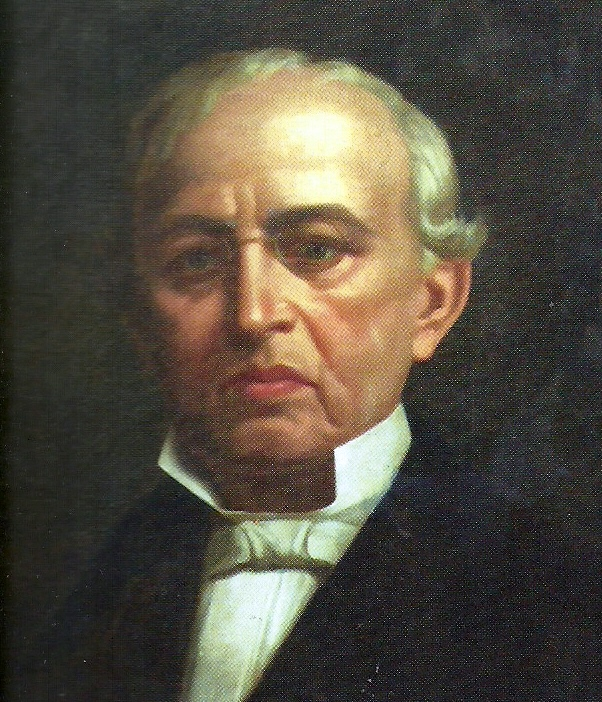

1st President of the Republic of Yucatán and Governor of Yucatán
- In office August 22, 1840 – December 11, 1841
- Preceded by: None
- Succeeded by: Miguel Barbachano
- In office October 13, 1842 – August 18, 1842
- Preceded by: Miguel Barbachano
- Succeeded by: Miguel Barbachano
- In office November 14, 1843 – May 15, 1844
- Preceded by: Miguel Barbachano
- Succeeded by: Miguel Barbachano
- In office October 3, 1847 – March 26, 1847
- Preceded by: Domingo Barret
- Succeeded by: Miguel Barbachano

Personal details
- Born: Santiago Méndez Ibarra; 1798 Campeche, New Spain
- Died: 1872 (aged 73–74) Mexico City, Mexico
- Occupation: Politician

Santiago Méndez Ibarra (1798 – 1872) was governor of Yucatán, Mexico 3 times from 1840 to 1857: 1840–44; 1847–48; 1855–57, alternating that office with Miguel Barbachano mainly during his first and second terms. Méndez was a moderate who advocated a strict conservative financial policy for the government. He was noted for his honesty, and gained no personal fortune from his years in governmental power. Santiago Méndez was more in favor of union with Mexico than Barbachano, but twice presided over Yucatán declaring its independence, due to frustration with Mexican dictator Antonio López de Santa Anna.

Santiago Méndez was father of Concepción Méndez Echazarreta and grandfather of Justo Sierra Méndez. Justo Sierra O'Reilly, his son-in-law collaborated with him in policy.
