= Republic of Yucatán =

Country in southeastern Mexico (1823, 1841–48)

Republic of Yucatán República de Yucatán (Spanish)
- 1841–1848
- Flag Coat of Arms

- Capital: Mérida; 20°58′N 89°37′W
- Common languages: Spanish (de facto); Yucatec Maya
- Religion: Catholicism
- Government: Federal republic
- President
  - 1840–1841 (first): Santiago Méndez
  - 1847–1848 (last): Miguel Barbachano
- History
  - Independence: March 16, 1841
  - Disestablished: July 14, 1848
- Currency: Mexican real
Preceded by	Succeeded by
Yucatán	Yucatán; Chan Santa Cruz
- Today part of: Mexico; Belize

The Republic of Yucatán (Spanish: República de Yucatán) was a sovereign state during two periods of the nineteenth century. The first Republic of Yucatán, founded May 29, 1823, willingly joined the Mexican federation as the Federated Republic of Yucatán on December 23, 1823, less than seven months later. The second Republic of Yucatán began in 1841, with its declaration of independence from the Centralist Republic of Mexico. It remained independent for seven years, after which it rejoined the United Mexican States. The area of the former republic includes the modern Mexican states of Yucatán, Campeche and Quintana Roo. The Republic of Yucatán usually refers to the second republic (1841–1848).

The Republic of Yucatán was governed by the Constitution of 1841 which guaranteed individual rights, religious freedom and what was then a new legal form called amparo (English: protection). The 1847 Caste War caused the Republic of Yucatán to request military aid from Mexico. This was given on the condition that the Republic rejoin the Mexican Federation.

== Colonial era and independence from Spain ==
In 1617, Yucatán was administered as a Captaincy General of New Spain. Its geographical position gave it some autonomy. During the Spanish Viceroyalty, the province and captaincy of Yucatán covered the current territories of Campeche, Quintana Roo, Tabasco, and Yucatán, plus, nominally, the northern territories of the Petén and the territory that is currently Belize. In 1786, the Spanish Crown implemented the system of Intendencias and the territory changed its name to Intendency of Yucatán, which included the same territories.

=== War of Mexican Independence ===
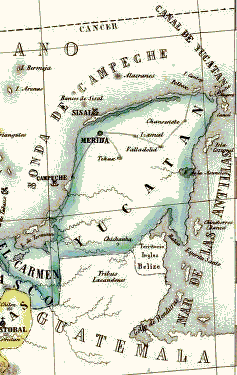
Captaincy General of Yucatán

In 1810, the priest Miguel Hidalgo y Costilla issued the Grito de Dolores (in effect a call for independence) in Dolores near Guanajuato. An army of insurgents began an eleven-year war of independence that culminated in a Mexican victory over the viceroy's armies. In 1821 the Mexicans offered the crown of the new Mexican Empire to Ferdinand VII or to a member of the Spanish royal family that he would designate. After the refusal of the Spanish monarchy to recognize the independence of Mexico, the ejército Trigarante (Army of the Three Guarantees), led by Agustín de Iturbide and Vicente Guerrero, cut all political and economic dependence on Spain. The Plan of Iguala established Roman Catholicism as Mexico's religion and equality for all social and ethnic groups in the new empire. These goals were summarized as "Religion, Independence and Unity" (Religión, Independencia y Unión).

Once the independence of the Mexican Empire was declared, Agustín de Iturbide was designated President of the Regency; because of his great popularity and prestige, the Interim Board gave him full authority. Elections for the Constituent Congress took place in December 1821 and in January 1822. There is no accurate record of how many deputies were elected, but it has been estimated at about 126, plus 52 given to Guatemala, Honduras, Nicaragua, Chiapas, former captaincies which also agreed to the Plan of Iguala.

José Joaquín Fernández de Lizardi, called The Mexican Thinker, proposed the right of Agustín de Iturbide to be emperor. On May 19, 1822 Valentín Gómez Farías presented a proposal signed by a minority of 42 deputies to proclaim Iturbide as Emperor, citing his extraordinary services as El Libertador (The Liberator). The masses also supported the appointment. Lorenzo de Zavala, a republican and liberal, objected, claiming that the Iturbide's supporters included the old viceroyalty leadership: the clergy, the nobility, and the army (including such men as Antonio López de Santa Anna). Regardless, Iturbide's coronation took place on July 21, 1822 in the Mexico City Metropolitan Cathedral, and he became emperor of Mexico as Agustin I.

=== Impact of Mexican independence ===
Just as Yucatán's geographical remoteness from the center of New Spain, specifically from Mexico City, had limited the influence of the viceroy on Yucatecan governance, so did it limit the military effects of Mexico's war of independence. Among the enlightened Yucatecan, the war encouraged a liberated spirit. The Yucatecan intelligentsia met regularly to discuss the war for independence in central Mexico at the Church of San Juan, located in Mérida, Yucatán. From this church they received their name, the Sanjuanistas. After the promulgation of the Constitution of Cádiz in 1812, Sanjuanistas grew in number, including Vicente María Velázquez (Chaplain of the church of San Juan), Manuel Jiménez Solís, Lorenzo de Zavala and José Matías Quintana, father of Andrés Quintana Roo. In 1814 King Ferdinand VII abolished the Constitution of Cádiz, and those who gathered in the church of San Juan were persecuted. Some of them arrested and imprisoned, including Lorenzo de Zavala, José Francisco Bates, and José Matias Quintana.

In 1820, Lorenzo de Zavala, a former Sanjuanista, formed the Patriotic Confederation. A schism developed within the Confederation that resulted in two opposing groups. One included the supporters of the Spanish government and the Constitution of Cádiz. The other, led by Zavala, sought complete independence from Spain. To eliminate the opposition, Mariano Carrillo Albornoz, then governor, forced Zavala and another former Sanjuanista, Manuel Garcia Sosa, to accept posts as deputies of the Cortes (legislative assembly of Spain) and sent them to Madrid; he ordered the other liberals imprisoned.

=== Federal pact with Mexico ===
Echeverri, who succeeded Carrillo Albornoz in 1821, proclaimed the independence of the peninsula and sent two representatives to negotiate the incorporation of Yucatán into the Mexican Empire. This incorporation took place on November 2, 1821.

In December 1822 Antonio López de Santa Anna and General Guadalupe Victoria signed the Plan of Casa Mata, a pact through which they sought to abolish the monarchy and transform Mexico into a republic. Initially a supporter of Iturbide, Santa Anna had adopted the republican cause. Agustín I was forced to abdicate and left the country. In May 1823, following Iturbide's resignation, Victoria became the first president of Mexico and Santa Anna became governor of Yucatán. Yucatán joined as the Federated Republic of Yucatán on December 23, 1823. Both were founding states of the United Mexican States.

The Federal Constitution of the United Mexican States of 1824 fully satisfied the ideals of the Yucatecan. The Constitution of Yucatán of 1825 reflects the agreement in principles:

Yucatán swears that recognizes and responds to the government of Mexico, only if it is liberal and representative; and with the condition that: The union of Yucatán is that of a Federated Republic, and not otherwise, and therefore entitled to form their particular Constitution and establish the laws that it deems necessary to its happiness.

In the Mexican government, two policies competed for primacy at that time. The Federalists argued for the balance of power among the three branches of state: executive, legislative, and judicial. The Centralists centered all authority on President of the Republic. Federalists ruled in Mexico from the birth of the Republic until 1835, and this corresponds with calm, peaceful relations between Mexico and the Yucatán. In 1835 the Centralists took power in Mexico and appointed the governor of Yucatán. As the Yucatán lost more and more of its autonomy, its people considered more seriously the possibility of their own independence and the formation of a second republic.

An important case set a precedent for the independence of the Yucatán and the formation of a new republic. As Mexico had won its independence from Spain, several provinces on the periphery of New Spain had been subsumed into the new Mexican empire and its successor state, the Republic of Mexico, or the United States of Mexico. One of its northernmost territories, Texas, had been populated mostly by settlers from the United States. Mexican centralization conflicted with the ideas of the Anglo-Texans, who decided to seek US volunteers for their own independence. With that support, Texas attained independence and emerged as a republic. The first vice-president of the Republic of Texas was Lorenzo de Zavala, a Mexican born in Yucatán and Minister of Finance in the government of the second Mexican president Vicente Guerrero.

== First Republic ==
The Centralist Republic with the separatist movements generated by the dissolution of the Federal Republic. Area in rebellion Area claimed by the Republics of Texas and the Rio Grande Area not in rebellion

=== Declaration of independence ===
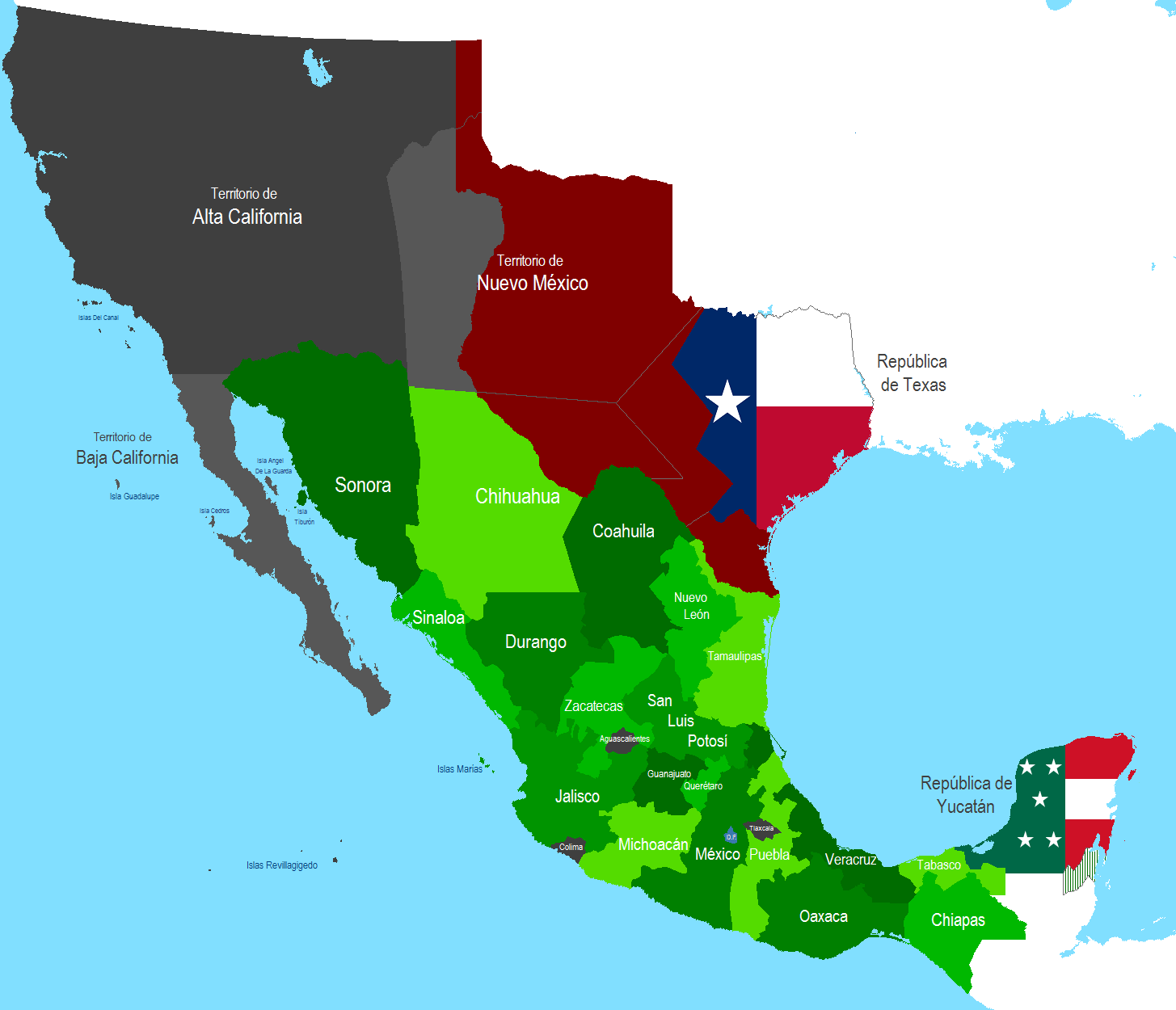
Map of México in 1847.

The federal army of Yucatán, commanded by Captain Santiago Imán, took the city of Valladolid and on February 12, 1840 issued a report, which stated that federalism should be restored as a form of government to combat poverty in the country. The act required the reestablishment of the Mexican Constitution of 1824. Six days later, in the presence of troops of the garrison of Mérida (the Yucatán capital city) under the command of Anastasio Torrens, and many supporters, Captain Santiago Imán proclaimed the independence of the Yucatecan territory. On June 6, 1840, the city of Campeche surrendered to the Yucatecan Federalists after a military siege. The central government of Mexico declared war on the Yucatán.

On March 16, 1841 at the first City Council meeting in Mérida, a crowd led by Miguel Barbachano Terrazo (future governor of Yucatán) broke into the room calling for the independence of Yucatán. Some members of this group lowered the Mexican flag, without considering the consequences, raising in its place a flag called the Yucatecan. Officially a few days after the Mexican flag was removed from boats and buildings in favor of the Yucatecan flag.

On October 1, 1841, the local Chamber of Deputies adopted the Act of Independence of the Yucatán Peninsula. The first article stated:

The people of Yucatán, in the full exercise of its sovereignty is becoming free and independent republic of the Mexican nation....

The Yucatán flag was hoisted first in the government building of the town of Yucatec on March 16, 1841, in protest at Santa Anna's centralization of Mexico. "The flag of Yucatán is divided into two fields: on the left, a field of green; and on the right, another divided in turn into three, red top and bottom, and white in the middle. The field of green features five stars standing for the five departments into which Yucatán was divided by a decree of November 30, 1840, namely: Mérida, Izamal, Valladolid, Campeche, and Tekax." The colors of the flag of the Yucatán are identical to those of the Mexican flag, in contrast to the flag of the other republic to declare independence from Mexico, the Republic of Texas, which used the colors of the flag of the United States.

=== Yucatecan Constitution of 1841 ===
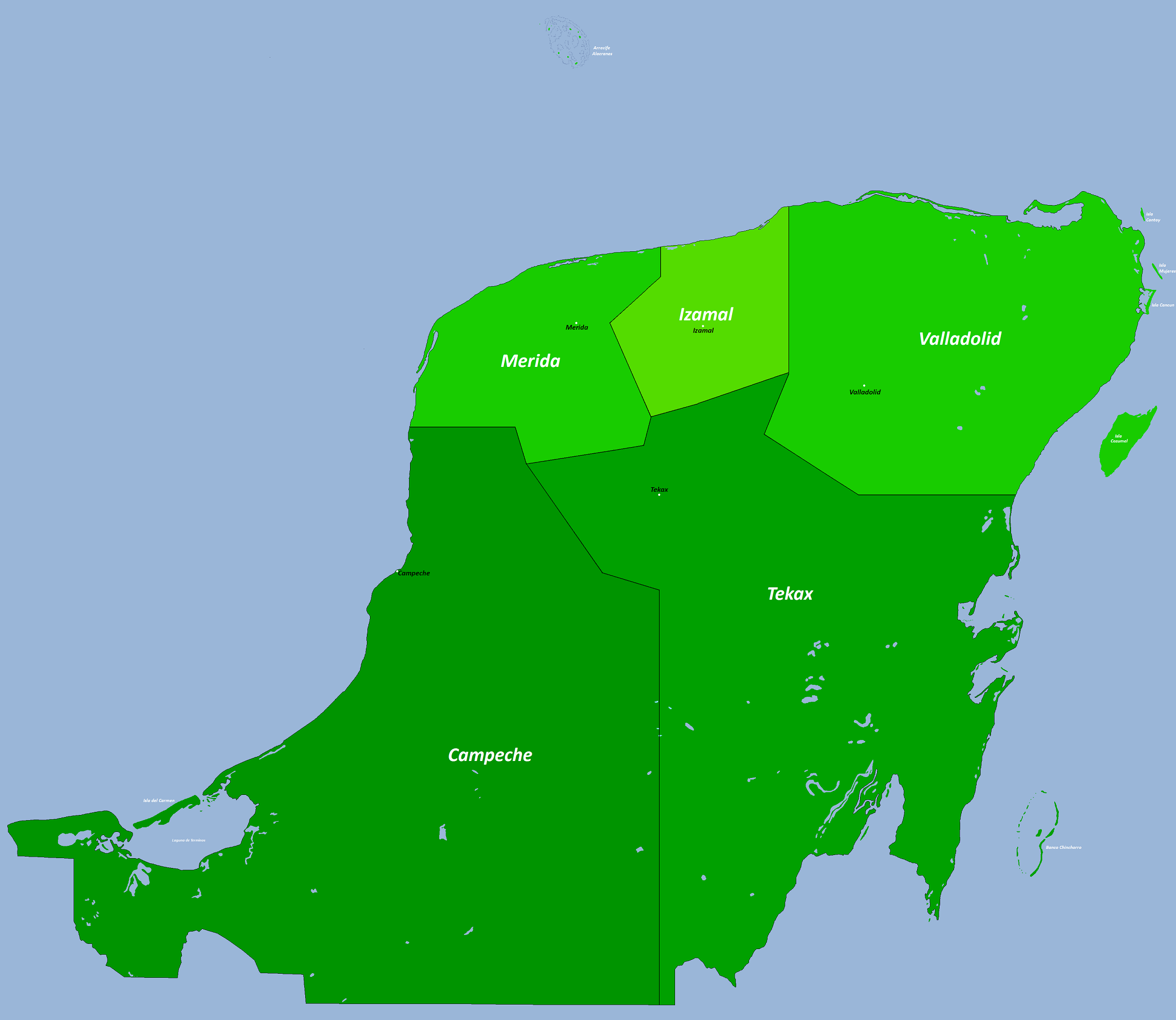
The Republic was divided into 5 districts.

The innovative 1841 Constitution of Yucatán was based on the Constitution of the State of Yucatán in 1825 but also contained a reform package drafted by the liberal lawyer Manuel Crescencio García Rejón. It was promulgated on March 31, 1841 and entered into force on May 16.

Important rights included individual rights as the fundamental rights of all citizens of the state either at home or abroad; the declaration of freedom of religion, in article 79: "none to be molested for his religious views, and those who come to settle in the country, as their descendants, have secured him the public and private exercise of their respective religions"; Article 69 established trial by a jury of peers. Article 73 abolished required civil or military service. Section I of Article 62 re-established the Amparo, the process of legal protection which is based on the idea of limiting the power of government authorities.

=== Santa Anna's coup and the Mexican rapprochement ===
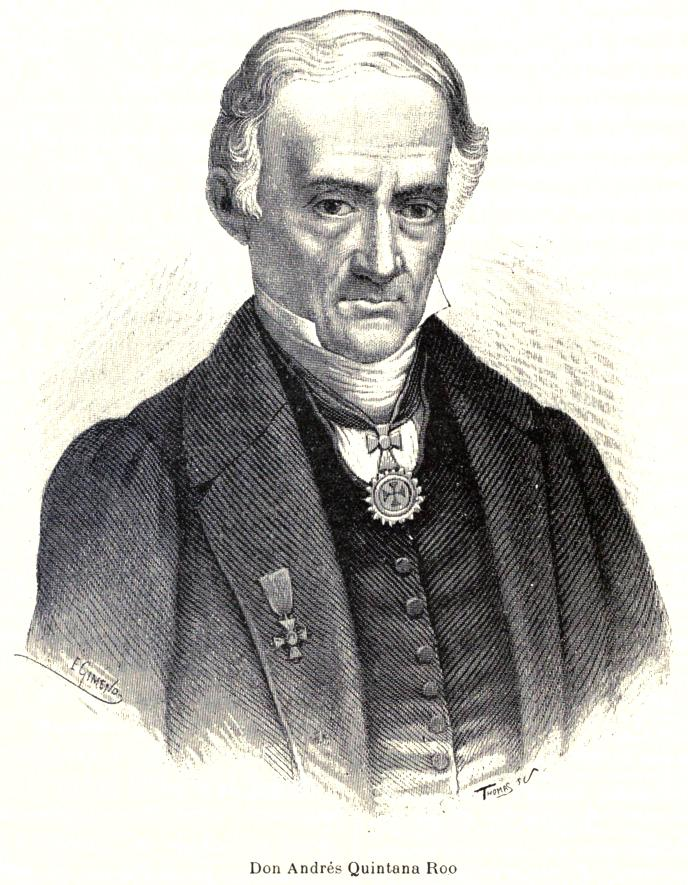
Andrés Quintana Roo

In October 1841, Antonio López de Santa Anna became president in a coup d'état, replacing Anastasio Bustamante. Santa Anna radicalized the centralist position of his government. He commissioned Andrés Quintana Roo, a native of Mérida, to negotiate with the Yucatecan authorities and Congress about rejoining Mexico. Quintana Roo's commission succeeded and the treaties of 28 and 29 November 1841 were signed. In them, Yucatán retained its own customs and tariff laws, and the free entry of goods to ports of the Republic was allowed to continue, among other benefits to Yucatán.

But the central government in Mexico City ignored these treaties. Instead, the central government demanded that Yucatán rejoin Mexico without conditions and fully accept the Plan of Tacubaya, and that Yucatán territory should be subject to all laws of Congress established by Santa Anna. It also required that Yucatán break all relations with the Republic of Texas, because Mexico was at war with the Texans. Attempts were made through several diplomatic channels to resolve the problems, but all failed.

=== Armed invasion of the Peninsula ===
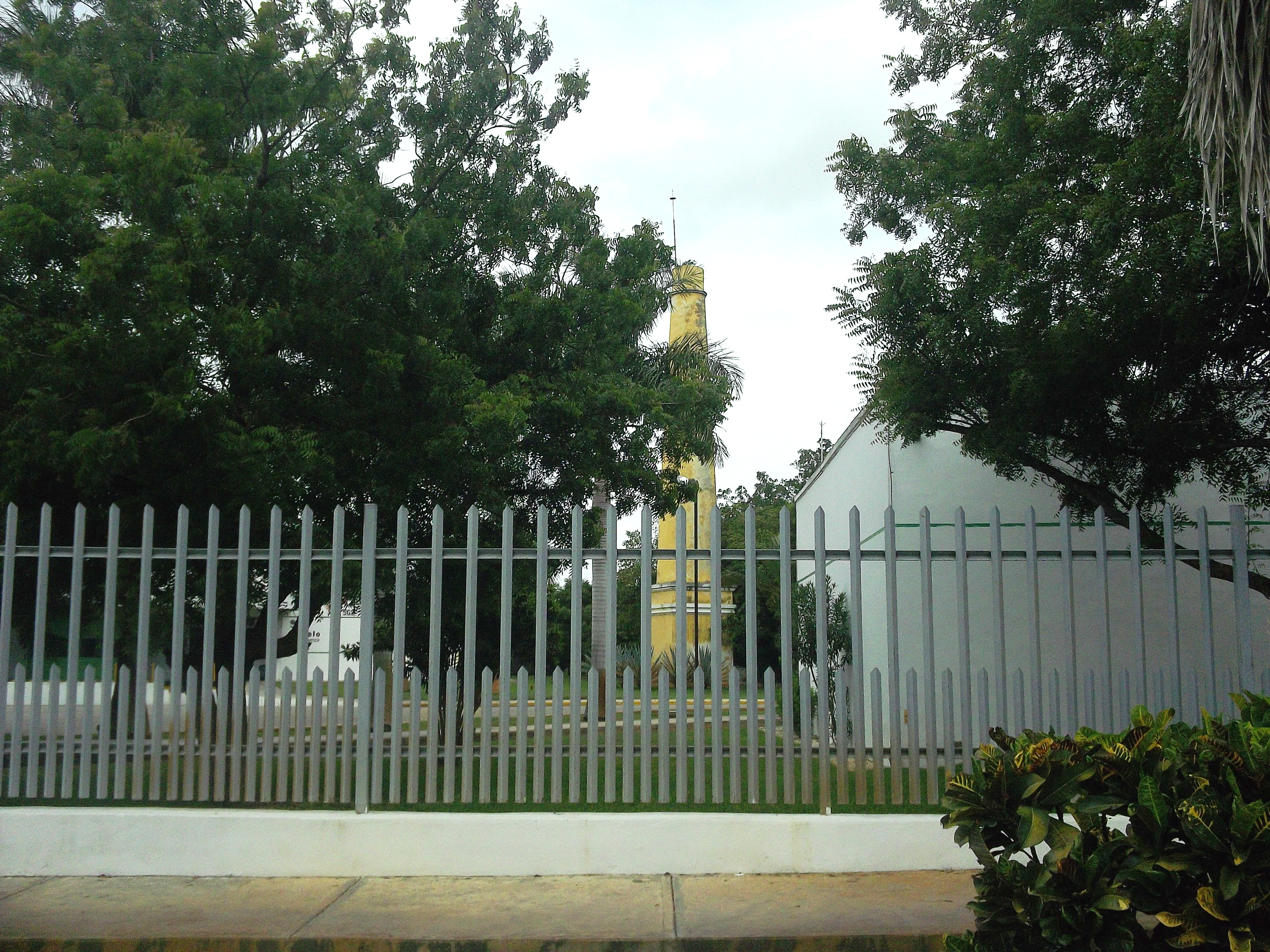
Pacabtún farm. It is currently within the City of Mérida and is privately owned.

Failing in the attempt to subdue Yucatán with words, Santa Anna sent armed forces to the peninsula to hunt for the federalists. In August 1842, a Mexican naval squadron formed off Carmen Island (now Ciudad del Carmen, Campeche), including four warships and commanded by Captain Thomas Marin. Marin demanded that Yucatán return to Mexico. A few days later his soldiers took the island without encountering armed resistance.

Control of this island gave the Mexican military a strategic base between the Mexican mainland and the Yucatecan peninsula. Water travel provided the fastest route between Yucatán and Mexico. There were no land routes through the jungles, and the sharp curve of the peninsula meant that the shortest distance between Valladolid, and Mexico City was over water.

Marin's small force was reinforced by Santa Anna's army of 4,000 men brought from Veracruz, and moved to his next goal: Campeche, a city that was protected by thick walls, built during the colonial era to defend the city from pirate attacks. The Mexican army took the city of Champoton, and after several failed attempts to take Campeche decided to go on to the capital, Mérida. The army landed at the port of Telchac Puerto and took one by one Telchac Pueblo, Motul, and Tixkokob.

The Mexican army arrived at Pacabtún's farm near Mérida, where they learned that Yucatán had already prepared the defense of Mérida, reinforced by 11,000 Mayan indigenous soldiers. On April 24, 1843, Mexican General Peña y Barragán surrendered and agreed to withdraw his troops by sea to Tampico in the state of Tamaulipas.

=== Rapprochement: temporary return to Mexico ===
Despite the withdrawal, Santa Anna refused to recognize the independence of Yucatán and banned the entry of ships under flag of Yucatán to Mexican territory. He also prohibited the transit of Mexican ships to Yucatán. This overturned all Yucatecan trade with the mainland of Mexico, causing deep economic problems. Barbachano, knowing that Santa Anna was defeated in the military by Yucatán, decided to negotiate with the central government.

Yucatán proposed several conditions to the central government. Santa Anna agreed to several conditions giving full autonomy to the Yucatán on December 5, 1843. Yucatán resumed trade with Mexico and the Republic retained its sovereignty.

== Second period of separation ==
The Mexican government on February 21, 1844 ruled that unique rights and autonomy awarded to Yucatán were unconstitutional. In late 1845, the Mexican Congress revoked the Conventions of December 1843. In view of this, the Assembly of Yucatán declared its independence on January 1, 1846.

Yucatán had additional conflicts besides the one with Mexico. Political Yucatecans were divided between the partisans of Mérida, led by Miguel Barbachano, and the partisans of Campeche, led by Santiago Méndez. This rivalry was so pointed that by early 1847 Yucatán had a government in both camps. To this should also be added a third group, the indigenous Maya peoples, who formed the bulk of the Yucatecan military and manual labor force.

In 1846, the Mexican government returned to the 1824 Constitution, restoring Mexican federalism. The Mérida-Barbachano faction received the news enthusiastically and agreed to rejoin Mexico on November 2, 1846. On the other side, the Campeche-Méndez faction claimed that any reunion with Mexico would involve Yucatán in war with the United States. In October 1846, the US Navy took Ciudad del Carmen, and blockaded Yucatán. On January 21, 1847, Santiago Méndez moved the Yucatán capital to Campeche which, within a few months, was also cut off by the US Navy from trade with Texas, Mérida and Mexico.

But meanwhile, widespread resentment and discontent had developed among the Mayan population. They paid high taxes, provided most manual and unskilled labor, and formed most of the rank and file of the military, while subject to discrimination and institutional racism by the wealthy whites and mestizos who controlled the regional government (including both the Campeche and Merida factions). Additionally, the Mayan people had historically always lived in extreme poverty, They had endured these conditions since the Spanish conquest.

On July 30, 1847, at Tepich, the Mayans revolted, launching what became the Caste War.

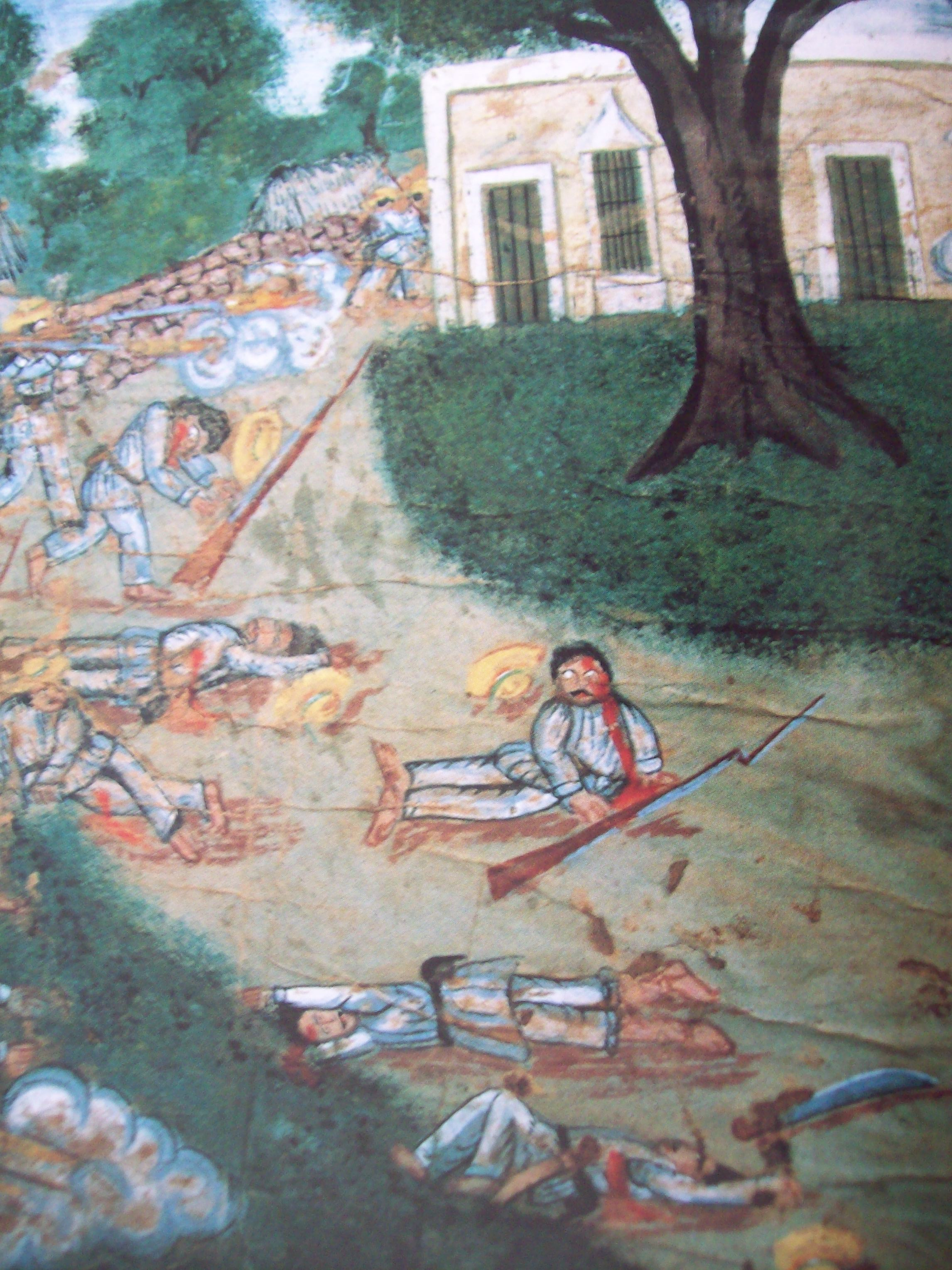
A scene from the Caste War. Oil on canvas, anonymous, painted circa 1850.

Between the American blockade and the Mayan uprising, the Méndez government faced a critical problem of internal security and protection of trade. Méndez sent a delegation, led by Judge José Rovira, to Washington, D.C. to argue that Yucatán's neutrality in the Mexican–American War should protect it from hostile blockade. They highlighted the Yucatán independence from Mexico based on the injustices committed by the Mexican central government and that their trade with the Gulf of Mexico was crucial. Rovira apparently considered suggesting the annexation of the Yucatán by the United States. A second delegation headed by Justo Sierra O'Reilly sent in 1848 did offer the annexation of the entire peninsula to the United States, a project that was strongly supported by Sierra O'Reilly, as documented by the 1938 publication of his diary of this trip and the discussions he held with American politicians.

The Méndez government succeeded in recovering part of Yucatán territory lost to the Maya: the cities Izamal, Tunkás, Ticul, Tekax, and Yaxcabá as well as Calotmul and Valladolid, with the help of troops from Mexico. Marcelo Pat's death, the son of Jacinto, forced him to abandon the struggle. Eventually, the Caste War overwhelmed Yucatán efforts at security and internal stability.

In desperation, President Santiago Méndez offered Yucatecan sovereignty in exchange for military assistance to the governor of the island of Cuba, the admiral of Jamaica, and the ministers of Spain and the United Kingdom, but none responded to his pleas, although the British did sell the Yucatecans arms and supplies through their colony in Belize. In addition to this, the British also received thousands of Yucatecan and Mayan refugees in Belize who were trying to escape the war. Finally, and as mentioned above, the Yucatecan delegation in Washington made a formal offer for the annexation of Yucatán to the United States, an argument that appealed to some of the radical expansionists and the Young America movement. President James Knox Polk was pleased with the idea and the "Yucatán Bill" passed the U.S. House of Representatives, but was discarded by the Senate. The war with Mexico had become more complicated than anticipated, and the Congress of the United States did not want a second war with the natives of Yucatán. In the end, although the United States did not formally intervene in the war of the castes or to secure the independence of Yucatan, dozens of American citizens fought for the Republic of Yucatan as mercenaries, most of them being veterans of the Mexican-American war which had recently concluded.

== Final return to Mexico ==
Méndez decided to return the government of Yucatán to Miguel Barbachano, who took office in April 1848. The first thing Barbachano did as governor was inform the government of Mexico, who resided in the city of Querétaro, the distressing situation of the war of castes and seek economic and military assistance.

Mexican President José Joaquín Herrera, was welcomed to Barbachano, and July 14 of 1848 gave 150,000 pesos to Yucatán (of 3 million that the U.S. gave to Mexico as payment for territory acquired in the Mexican–American War) and sent arms and ammunition to Yucatán. The Mexican Government sent the following message to Barbachano:

Mr. Governor, will be useless after exposure to me the wishes of the nation, the feelings of the representatives, and the conduct of the Government of Yucatán if I don't extended for the purpose of convincing the intensity of interest in the fate of the excited state and the government decision to save. For all the current administration should not be remembered past misfortunes, but as a harsh lesson that we all have a duty to repair indicates both misfortune. The President sees no more than one in Yucatán and very interesting part of the Union, or its citizens more than our brothers handed over to the relentless fury of the wild.

The rebellion of the indigenous Maya was put down in August 1848 and August 17 of that year, Barbachano ordered the resumption of a confederation of Mexico and the restoration of the 1825 Constitution of Yucatán.

Another of the consequences of the war of the castes was that it altered the international geopolitical divisions of the region between Guatemala and Mexico: since 1823 the biggest and northernmost province of Guatemala, Petén, attempted to annex itself to the state of Yucatán; however, the annexation project was put off several times and finally shelved around 1856 as the war worsened and the Mayans scored several victories.

== In fiction ==
- La Casta Divina, a Mexican film about Yucatán during independence.

== See also ==
- Yucatán
- Republic of Texas
- Republic of the Rio Grande
- Revolt of 1837 (New Mexico)
- California Revolt led by Juan Bautista Alvarado
- Mexican–American War
- Caste War
- Territorial evolution of Mexico
