= Miguel Barbachano =

Mexican politician, Governor of Yucatán (1807–1859)

Miguel Barbachano y Tarrazo
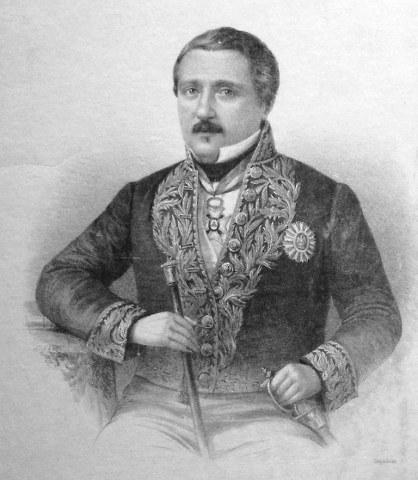

2nd President of the Republic of Yucatán and Governor of Yucatán
- In office December 11, 1841 – October 13, 1842
- Preceded by: Santiago Méndez
- Succeeded by: Santiago Méndez
- In office August 18, 1842 – November 14, 1843
- Preceded by: Santiago Méndez
- Succeeded by: Santiago Méndez
- In office May 15, 1844 – June 2, 1844
- Preceded by: Santiago Méndez
- Succeeded by: José Tiburcio López
- In office January 1, 1846 – January 21, 1847
- Preceded by: José Tiburcio López
- Succeeded by: Domingo Barret Echeverri
- In office March 26, 1847 – July 14, 1848
- Preceded by: Santiago Méndez
- Succeeded by: Crescencio José Pinelo (Governor of Yucatán)

Governor of Yucatán
- In office July 14, 1848 – February 13, 1853
- Preceded by: Santiago Méndez (President of the Republic of Yucatán)
- Succeeded by: Crescencio José Pinelo

Personal details
- Born: Miguel Barbachano y Tarrazo; 29 September 1807 Campeche, New Spain
- Died: 17 December 1859 (aged 52)
- Spouses: Feliciana Camara (m. 1841) Maria del Pilar Quijano (m. 1851)
- Occupation: Politician

Miguel Barbachano y Tarrazo (29 September 1807 – 17 December 1859) (Baqueiro 1896) was a liberal Yucatecan politician, who was 5 times governor of Yucatán between 1841 and 1853.

Miguel Barbachano y Tarrazo was born in the city of Campeche, a son of Manuel Barbachano and his wife, the former Maria Josefa Tarrazo.

He was one of the staunchest advocates for the independence of Yucatán from Mexico, but historical circumstances led to Yucatán twice declaring its independence while Barbachano was out of power, and twice Barbachano arranged for Yucatán's reunification with Mexico.

He generally alternated in power with the centrist Santiago Méndez, who was more in favor of union with Mexico but was driven to declare independence by the excesses of Mexican dictator Antonio López de Santa Anna.

The final reunification was due to the crisis of the Caste War of Yucatán.

== Terms as governor ==
Miguel Barbachano's terms as Governor of Yucatán were:

- 11 June 1841 to 13 October 1841
- 18 August 1842 to 14 November 1843
- 15 May 1844 to 2 June 1844
- 1 January 1846 to 21 January 1847
- 26 March 1848 to 13 February 1853

== Marriages ==
He was married twice, first (in 1842) to Feliciana Camara and second (1851) to Maria del Pilar Quijano.
