= Governor of Yucatán =

Chief executive of the Mexican state of Yucatán

- Seal of the State of Yucatán

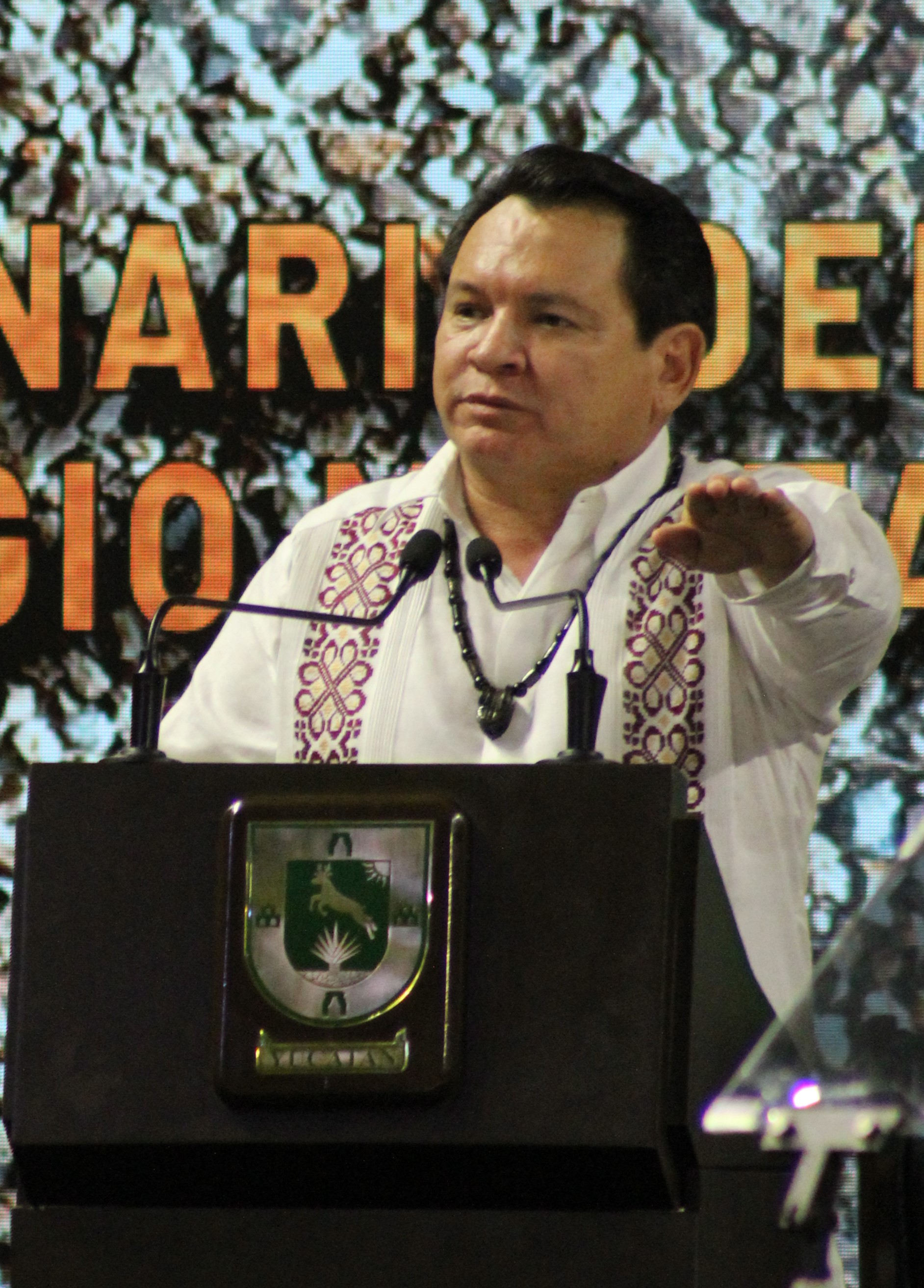
- Incumbent; Joaquín Díaz Mena since October 1, 2024
- Type: State governor
- Term length: Six years, non-renewable.
- Constituting instrument: Popular election
- Formation: 1546
- First holder: Francisco de Montejo
- Salary: $95,532 mexican pesos MXN (2019)
- Website: Official website

The governor of the State of Yucatan is the head of the executive branch of the Mexican state of Yucatán, elected to a six-year-term and not eligible for reelection. The figure of the governor is established on the Constitution of the State of Yucatan on its Title Fifth. The term of the Governor begins on October 1 of the year of the election and finishes September 30, six years later.

The same constitution empowers those individuals to be elected governor who have held the title of executive power but in a different way to the popular election, namely the interim, or temporary replacements. The latter has caused controversies and political conflicts, because in the view of several instances is in conflict with a precept of the Political Constitution of the United Mexican States that stipulates that no state governor may hold power for more than six years.

== List of governors of Yucatan ==
The state of Yucatán was created on January 31, 1824, being one of the original states of the federation, which along their history has passed through all the systems of government in place in Mexico: the federal system as the central system, so that the name of the entity has varied between state and department; varying with it, the name of the holder of the executive branch of the State.

Individuals who have occupied the governorship in the state of Yucatán, in its various denominations, have been:

=== 16th century ===
- (1526–1540): Francisco de Montejo. Adelantado.
- (1540–1546): Francisco de Montejo the Younger. Captain General.
- (1546–1549): Francisco de Montejo. Adelantado.
- (1550–1552): Gaspar Juárez de Ávila – First Mayor
- (1552–1553): Tomás López Medel
- (1553–1554): Francisco de Montejo the Younger. Captain General and governor.
- (1554–1554): Francisco Tamayo Pacheco
- (1554–1555): Álvaro Carvajal
- (1555–1558): Alonso Ortiz Delgueta
- (1558–1559): Juan de Paredes
- (1560–1560): García Jufré de Loaiza
- (1561–1564): Diego de Quijada – First Mayor appointed directly by the king.
- (1565–1571): Luis de Céspedes y Oviedo (first Captain General of Yucatán).
- (1571–1572): Diego de Santillán
- (1573–1576): Francisco de Velásquez Gijón
- (1577–1581): Guillén de las Casas
- (1582–1592): Francisco de Solís
- (1593–1596): Alonso Ordóñez de Nevares
- (1596–1597): Carlos de Sámano y Quiñónez

=== 17th century ===
- (1598–1604): Diego Fernández de Velasco (governor)
- (1604–1612): Carlos de Luna y Arellano
- (1612–1617): Antonio de Figueroa y Bravo
- (1617–1619): Francisco Ramírez Briceño (first Captain General of Yucatán)
- (1620–1621): Arias de Lozada y Taboada
- (1621–1628): Diego de Cárdenas
- (1628–1630): Juan de Vargas Machuca
- (1630–1631): Íñigo de Argüello y Carvajal, oidor of Real Audiencia de México
- (1631–1633): Fernando Centeno Maldonado (interim)
- (1633–1635): Jerónimo de Quero
- (1635–1636): Fernando Centeno Maldonado (interim)
- (1636–1636): Andrés Pérez Franco
- (1636–1643): Diego Zapata de Cárdenas
- (1643–1644): Francisco Núñez Melián
- (1644–1645): Enrique Dávila Pacheco (interim)
- (1645–1648): Esteban de Azcárraga
- (1648–1650): Enrique Dávila Pacheco (interim)
- (1650–1652): García de Valdés y Osorio
- (1652–1653): Martín de Robles y Villafaña (interim)
- (1653–1654): Pedro Sáenz Izquierdo (interim)
- (1655–1660): Francisco de Bazán
- (1660–1662): José Campero de Sorredevilla
- (1663–1664): Juan Francisco de Esquivel y la Rosa (interim)
- (1664–1664): Rodrigo Flores de Aldana
- (1664–1667): Juan Francisco de Esquivel y la Rosa (interim)
- (1667–1669): Rodrigo Flores de Aldana
- (1669–1670): Frutos Delgado (interim)
- (1670–1672): Fernando Francisco de Escobedo
- (1672–1674): Miguel Franco Cordóñez de Soto (Miguel Francisco Cordonio de Sola)
- (1674–1677): Sancho Fernández de Angulo y Sandoval
- (1677–1679): Antonio de Layseca y Alvarado
- (1679–1680): Juan de Aréchiga (interim)
- (1680–1683): Antonio de Layseca y Alvarado
- (1683–1688): Juan Bruno Téllez de Guzmán
- (1688–1692): Juan José de la Bárcena
- (1693–1695): Roque de Soberanis y Centeno
- (1695–1696): Martín de Urzúa y Arizmendi
- (1696–1699): Roque de Soberanis y Centeno
- (1699–1703): Martín de Urzúa y Arizmendi

=== 18th century ===
- (1703–1706): Álvaro de Rivaguda (interim)
- (1706–1708): Martín de Urzúa y Arizmendi
- (1708–1712): Fernando de Meneses y Bravo de Saravia
- (1712–1715): Alonso de Meneses y Bravo de Saravia
- (1715–1720): Juan José de Vértiz y Hontañón
- (1720–1724): Antonio Cortaire y Terreros
- (1725–1733): Antonio de Figueroa y Silva
- (1733–1734): Juan Francisco Fernández de Sabariego
- (1734–1736): Santiago de Aguirre (interim)
- (1736–1742): Manuel Salcedo
- (1743–1750): Antonio Benavides Bazán y Molina
- (1750–1752): Juan José de Clou
- (1752–1758): Melchor de Navarrete
- (1758–1761): Alonso Fernández de Heredia
- (1761–1762): José Crespo y Honorato. Put down the rebellion and determined the torture and death of Jacinto Canek, leader Maya.
- (1762–1763): Antonio Ainz de Ureta (interim)
- (1763–1763): José Álvarez (substitute)
- (1763–1764): Felipe Ramírez de Estenoz
- (1764–1764): José Álvarez (substitute)
- (1764–1770): Cristóbal de Zayas (interim)
- (1771–1776): Antonio de Oliver
- (1777–1777): Alonso Manuel Peón
- (1778–1778): Hugo O'Conor Cunco y Fali
- (1779–1779): Alonso Manuel Peón (substitute)
- (1779–1782): Roberto Rivas Betancourt (interim)
- (1783–1789): José Merino y Ceballos
- (1789–1792): Lucas de Gálvez
- (1792–1792): Alonso Manuel Peón (substitute)
- (1792–1793): José Sabido Vargas (interim)
- (1793–1800): Arturo O'Neill y O'Kelly

=== 19th century ===
- (1800–1810): Benito Pérez Valdelomar (start of war of independence of México)
- (1811–1812): Justo Serrano (lieutenant governor and acting governor, con Antonio Bolo)
- (1812–1812): Miguel de Castro y Araoz (King's lieutenant governor and acting governor)
- (1812–1815): Manuel Artazo y Torredemer
- (1815–1819): Miguel de Castro y Araoz
- (1820–1820): Mariano Carrillo de Albornoz
- (1821–1821): Juan María Echeverri y Manrique de Lara (last Spanish governor of Yucatán, from 1 January 1821 to November 8 of that year)
- (1821–1822): Pedro Bolio y Torrecillas. independent Mexico, pre-constitutional period.
- (1822–1822): Benito Aznar
- (1822–1823): Melchor Álvarez. pre-constitutional period.
- (1823–1823): Pedro Bolio y Torrecillas
- (June 1, 1823 – April 23, 1824): Interim Governing Board, chaired by José Segundo Carvajal Cavero
- (1824–1824): Francisco Antonio de Tarrazo (interim)

=== From independence to the Mexican Revolution ===
- José Tiburcio López Constante 1825
- Santiago Méndez Ibarra 5 terms, 1840s–1850s
- Miguel Barbachano 5 terms, 1841–1853
- Crescencio José Pinel
- Manuel Cepeda Peraza 1860s
- Manuel Cirerol y Canto 1870–1872
- General Protasio Guerra 1877
- José María Iturralde 1878
- Manuel Romero Ancona 1878–1882
- General Octavio Rosado 1882–1886
- General Guillermo Palomino 1886–1889
- Juan Pío Manzano 1889–1890
- Colonel Daniel Traconis 1890–1894
- Carlos Peón Machado 1894–1897
- José María Iturralde 1897–1898
- General Francisco "Pancho" Cantón 1898–1902
- José María Iturralde 1897–1898
- Olegario Molina 1902–1910
- Enrique Muñoz Arístegui (acting) 1907–1910
- José María Pino Suárez 1911
- Jesús L. González 1911
- Nicolás Cámara Vales
- Agustín Patrón Correa
- Nicolás Cámara Vales
- Fernando Solís León
- Arcadio Escobedo
- Felipe G. Solís
- Eugenio Rascón
- Prisciliano Cortés
- Eleuterio Ávila
- Toribio de los Santos
- Abel Ortiz Argumedo
- Salvador Alvarado Rubio 1915–1918
- Carlos Castro Morales
- Enrique Recio
- Francisco Vega Loyo
- Tomás Garrido Canabal
- Antonio Ancona Albertos
- Hircano Ayuso O'Horibe
- Manuel Berzunza

=== Governors of the Free and Sovereign State of Yucatan since the Revolution ===
- (1922–1924): Felipe Carrillo Puerto
- (1924): Juan Ricárdez Broca (usurper)
- (1924): Miguel Cantón (acting)
- (1924–1926): José María Iturralde Traconis
- (1926–1930): Álvaro Torre Díaz
- (1930–1934): Bartolomé García Correa, National Revolutionary Party, PNR
- (1934–1935): César Alayola Barrera, PNR
- (1935–1936): Fernando Cárdenas, PNR
- (1936–1938): Florencio Palomo Valencia, PNR
- (1938–1942): Humberto Canto Echeverría, Party of the Mexican Revolution, PRM
- (1942–1946): Ernesto Novelo Torres, PRM
- (1946–1951): José González Beytia PRI
- (1951–1952): Humberto Esquivel Medina PRI
- (1952–1953): Tomás Marentes Miranda PRI
- (1953–1958): Víctor Mena Palomo PRI
- (1958–1964): Agustín Franco Aguilar PRI
- (1964–1970): Luis Torres Mesías PRI
- (1970–1976): Carlos Loret de Mola Mediz PRI
- (1976–1982): Francisco Luna Kan PRI
- (1982–1984): Graciliano Alpuche Pinzón PRI
- (1984–1988): Víctor Cervera Pacheco PRI
- (1988–1991): Víctor Manzanilla Schaffer PRI
- (1991–1993): Dulce María Sauri Riancho PRI
- (1993–1994): Ricardo Ávila Heredia PRI
- (1994–1995): Federico Granja Ricalde PRI
- (1995–2001): Víctor Cervera Pacheco PRI
- (2001–2007): Patricio Patrón Laviada PAN
- (2007–2012): Ivonne Ortega Pacheco PRI
- (2012–2018): Rolando Zapata Bello PRI
- (2018–2024): Mauricio Vila Dosal PAN
- (2024) : María Dolores Fritz Sierra PAN
- (2024–present): Joaquín Díaz Mena MORENA

== See also ==
- List of Mexican state governors
