= Timeline of Mérida, Yucatán =

Coordinates: 20.97°N 89.62°W

The following is a timeline of the history of the city of Mérida, Yucatán, Mexico.

== Prehistory ==
- 66 million years ago – The ground beneath Mérida forms part of the impact crater of the meteorite linked to the Cretaceous–Paleogene extinction event, centred offshore to the North of the city.

== Prior to 20th century ==
- 1542 – Mérida founded by Francisco de Montejo the Younger on site of former city T'ho.
- 1547 – Franciscan convent active.
- 1549 – Montejo's residence.
- 1561 – Mérida Cathedral construction begins.
- 1598 – Mérida Cathedral construction completed.
- 1618 – School of Mérida opens.
- 1624 – Real y Pontificia Universidad de Mérida established.
- 1648 – Yellow fever epidemic.
- 1823 – Yucatán becomes part of Mexico.
- 1847 – Caste War of Yucatán begins.
- 1869 – Revista de Mérida newspaper begins publication.
- 1888 - Paseo de Montejo opened.
- 1892 – Government Palace (Palacio de Gobierno) built.
- 1900 – Population: 43,630.

== 20th century ==
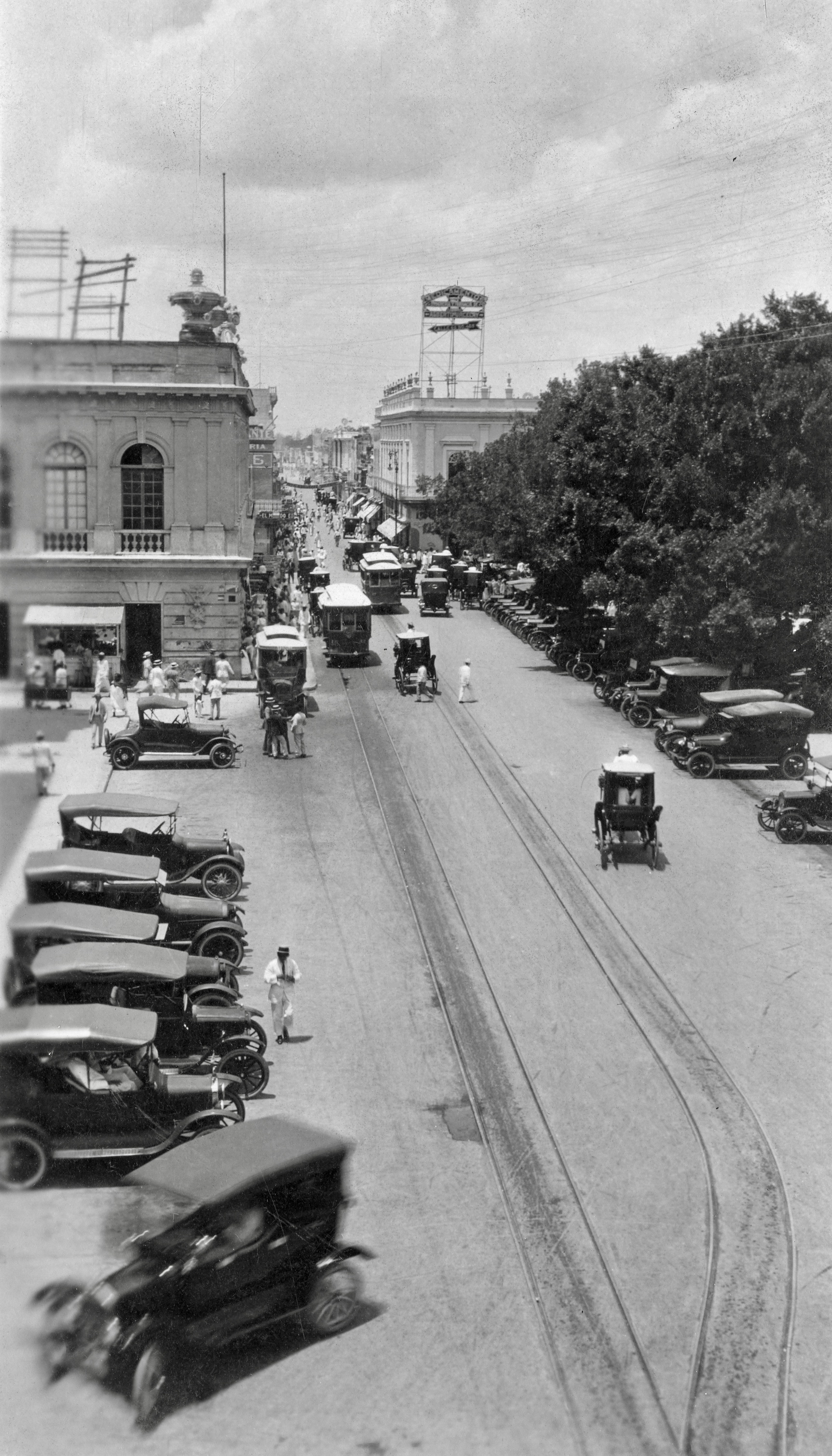
Calle 60 in front of the Cathedral, 1924

- 1908 - Museum of the City of Merida initiated.
- 1910 – Parque Zoológico del Centenario founded.
- 1922 – Universidad Nacional del Sureste established.
- 1925 – Diario de Yucatán newspaper begins publication.
- 1929 – Airport begins operating.
- 1949 – Cine Teatro Mérida opens.
- 1950 – Population: 144,793.
- 1957 – Monumento a la Patria erected on the Paseo Montejo.
- 1962 – Instituto Tecnológico de Mérida established.
- 1978 – Pacheco murals in the Palacio de Gobierno completed.
- 1983 – Jardin Botanico Regional del CICY (garden) established in Chuburná de Hidalgo.
- 1988 – The city is hit by Hurricane Gilbert.
- 1993 – Catholic Pope John Paul II visits city.
- 1999 – Bill Clinton visits the city in a binational meeting.
- 2000 – The city is designated as the 1st American Capital of Culture.

== 21st century ==
- 2001 -
  - Yucatan Symphony Orchestra founded.
  - Ana Rosa Payán becomes as the 29th mayor for a second period.
- 2002 – The city is hit by Hurricane Isidore.
- 2003 – C.F. Mérida football club formed.
- 2004 – Manuel Fuentes Alcocer becomes the 30th mayor.
- 2005 – The city held the International Mathematical Olympiad.
- 2006 – Mérida host the 18th International Olympiad in Informatics.
- 2007 -
  - George W. Bush is received in Mérida, here he signs the Mérida Initiative.
  - César Bojórquez Zapata becomes the 31st mayor.
- 2009 – The city held the 40th International Physics Olympiad.
- 2010
  - Angélica Araujo Lara becomes the 32nd mayor.
  - Population: 777,615; Metropolitan Area 973,046.
- 2011
  - The International Committee of the Banner of Peace titled Merida as "City of Peace".
  - The city held the II Alianza del Pacífico summit.
- 2012 – Alvaro Lara Pacheco becomes acting mayor, few months later Renán Barrera Concha wins the local election and he becomes the 34th mayor.
- 2014 – Mérida hosted the VI Summit of Association of Caribbean States, more than 25 Heads of State members came to the city.
- 2015
  - Mauricio Vila Dosal becomes the 35th mayor.
  - Raúl Castro, President of Cuba is received by President Enrique Peña Nieto in his first visit as President, to Mexico. Here he announced his retirement on 2018.
- 2018
  - María Dolores Fritz Sierra becomes the 36th mayor, as acting mayor in office.
  - The 3rd presidential debate of the 2018 general elections is hosted at the Mayan Museum of Merida
  - Renán Barrera Concha becomes the 37th mayor. First constitutionally re-elected after the 2015 constitutional reform.
- 2019
  - The city hosted the 17th World Summit of Nobel Peace Laureates, receiving more than 30 of them.

== See also ==
- Mérida history
- List of municipal presidents of Mérida
- Yucatán history and History of Yucatán

== Bibliography ==
=== In English ===
- John L. Stephens (1858), "(Merida)", Incidents of Travel in Yucatan, New York: Harper & Brothers
- Moore, Henry (1894), "Commercial Directory: Merida", Railway Guide of the Republic of Mexico, Springfield, Ohio: Huben & Moore, OCLC 22498265
- Campbell, Reau (1909), "Mérida", Campbell's New Revised Complete Guide and Descriptive Book of Mexico, Chicago: Rogers & Smith Co., OCLC 1667015
- "Mérida (Mexico)" . Encyclopædia Britannica. Vol. 18 (11th ed.). 1910. p. 165.
- W.H. Koebel, ed. (1921), "Mexico: Chief Towns: Mérida", Anglo-South American Handbook, vol. 1, New York: Macmillan, hdl:2027/mdp.39015027978728
- Ernst B. Filsinger (1922), "Mexico: Mérida", Commercial Travelers' Guide to Latin America, Washington, DC: Government Printing Office
- "Mérida", Baedeker's Mexico, Baedekers Guides, 1994, p. 275+, OL 11077410M (fulltext via OpenLibrary)
- José Luis Lezama (1994). "Mexico: Mérida". In Gerald Michael Greenfield (ed.). Latin American Urbanization: Historical Profiles of Major Cities. Greenwood Press. ISBN 0313259372.
- Michael D. Phillips (1995). "Mérida". In Trudy Ring; Robert M. Salkin (eds.). Americas. International Dictionary of Historic Places. Routledge. p. 362+. ISBN 978-1-134-25930-4.
- Fisher, John (1999), "Yucatan: Merida", Mexico, Rough Guides (4th ed.), London, p. 523+, OL 24935876M
- "Mérida", Yucatán (2nd ed.), Lonely Planet, 2003, OL 24928189M

=== In Spanish ===
- Antonio García Cubas [in Spanish] (1896). "Mérida". Diccionario Geográfico, Histórico y Biográfico de los Estados Unidos Mexicanos (in Spanish). Vol. 4. México: Antigua Imprenta de las Escalerillas. hdl:2027/coo.31924056282357.
