= Teabo Municipality =

Municipality in the Mexican state of Yucatán

Teabo
- Municipality
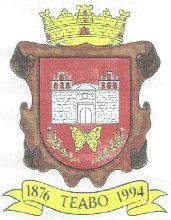
- Coat of arms

- Region 7 Sur #075

- Location of the Municipality in Mexico
- Coordinates: 20°24′N 89°17′W
- Country: Mexico
- State: Yucatán
- Yucatán independence from Spain: 1821
- Acquires title of "village": 1876

Government
  - Type: PRI 2012–2015
  - Municipal President: Roberto Alejandro López May

Area
  - Total: 678.2 km^{2} (261.87 sq mi)
- Elevation: 7 m (23 ft)

Population (2010)
  - Total: 6,205
  - Demonym: Teabeños
- Time zone: UTC-6 (Central Standard Time)
- Postal Code: 77500
- Area code: 998
- INEGI Code: 075
- Major Airport: Merida (Manuel Crescencio Rejón) International Airport
- IATA Code: MID
- ICAO Code: MMMD

Teabo Municipality (Spanish pronunciation: [teˈaβo]) is a municipality in the Mexican state of Yucatán. Its municipal seat is located in the town of Teabo.

The Municipality of Teabo shares a boundary on the north with Mayapán-humayel, on the south with Tekax, on the east with Cantamayec-Tixméhuac and the west with Maní-Akil. It is home to indigenous Mayan people who continue to follow cultural traditions kept for hundreds of years.

Vestiges of an important Mayan cemetery can be found in Teabo. Also, Teabo had two sacred buildings: the parish and ex-convent of San Pedro y San Pablo built in the 17th century and the Indian's Chapel that shows the date of 1617.

== Communities ==
The municipality is made up of 20 communities the most important are:

- Teabo (municipal seat)
- San Higinio
- Kulche

== History ==
Regarding the foundation of Teabo and the municipality of the same name, the exact dates are not known. During pre-Hispanic times it belonged to the chieftainship of Tutul Xiú. After its conquest it remained under the control of various Spaniards, first recorded in 1753. The evolution of the population begins in 1821, when Yucatán declared its independence of the Spanish crown. In 1876, Teabo acquired the title of "Villa," or village. By means of published Decree #144, Teabo changed status from village to town.

== Geography ==
=== Nearby cities ===
The distances from the municipal seat to nearby cities are as follows:

- Oxkutzcab, Yucatán · 18 kilometres (11 mi) southwest · 21,508 people.
- Ticul, Yucatán · 26 kilometres (16 mi) west · 30,282 people.
- Merida, Yucatán · 72 kilometres (45 mi) north-northwest · 717,175 people.

=== Climate ===
Climate data for Teabo
Month	Jan	Feb	Mar	Apr	May	Jun	Jul	Aug	Sep	Oct	Nov	Dec	Year
Mean daily maximum °C (°F)	30.2 (86.4)	31.5 (88.7)	32.9 (91.2)	34.1 (93.4)	34.9 (94.8)	34.0 (93.2)	33.1 (91.6)	33.2 (91.8)	33 (91)	32.3 (90.1)	30.9 (87.6)	30.1 (86.2)	32.5 (90.5)
Mean daily minimum °C (°F)	16.9 (62.4)	17.4 (63.3)	18.4 (65.1)	19.6 (67.3)	20.7 (69.3)	21.3 (70.3)	20.8 (69.4)	20.7 (69.3)	20.9 (69.6)	20.3 (68.5)	18.6 (65.5)	17.9 (64.2)	19.5 (67.1)
Average precipitation mm (inches)	46 (1.8)	36 (1.4)	43 (1.7)	56 (2.2)	89 (3.5)	180 (7.2)	150 (6.1)	200 (7.7)	230 (8.9)	140 (5.5)	66 (2.6)	41 (1.6)	1,280 (50.2)
Source: Weatherbase

== Celebrations, dances and traditions ==
=== Popular celebrations ===
- April 28 to May 3 in honor of Santa Cruz.
- July 27, in honor to San Pedro and San Pablo.
- December 8 to 12 in honor of the Virgin of Guadalupe, employer of the population.

=== Traditions and customs ===
For the Festival of the Saints, families build altars in their houses and food is offered to the deceased; typically consisting of traditional Mucbil chicken, accompanied by a cornflour drink, and chocolate beaten with water. Regional celebrations always include a dance called jarana, and large competitions are held by participants.

=== Typical clothing ===
By custom, the women use simple Huipiles, with embroidery that emphasizes the squared cut of the neck and the edge of the dress, is placed on Fustán that is an average subject curly bottom to the waist with earthen jar of the same fabric; they wear sandals, and to protect themselves from the sun, they cover themselves with rebozo.

The farmers, mainly the older ones, dress in comfortable trousers, crude blanket, T-shirt buttoned in the front, mandil (apron) made of cotí and a straw hat. For vaquerías, or celebrations, the women dress formally, wearing ornate Ternos, made with fine fabric, embroidery and cross-stitched designs, generally by hand. The Ternos are complemented with long gold chains, earrings, and bracelets, as well as rosaries made of coral.

The men dress in white trousers and wear guayaberas, embroidered shirts with front, waist level pockets (affluent men change the plastic buttons for a gold set of buttons), canvas shoes and hats of jipijapa. During festivals, traditional red handkerchiefs are tied around the neck, indispensable when dancing jaranas.

=== Crafts ===
The preparation of typical clothes, the embroidering by hand or to machine, urdido of hammocks with cotton threads and talabartería.

=== Gastronomy ===
==== Foods ====
They prepare with mass of corn meat of pig, chicken and deer accompanied with sharp sauces with chili peppers Havanan and max. The main ones are: kidney bean with pig, chaya with egg, stew of hen, stuffed cheese, salbutes, panuchos, venison pipian, papadzules, longaniza, cochinita pibil, joroches, mucbil chicken, pimes and tamales.

==== Candies ====
The people make yucca with honey, pumpkin melada, sweet potato with the Coco, cocoyol in syrup, pumpkin nugget marzipan, marshmallow, round maize loaves, tejocotes in syrup and candy of ciricote.

==== Drinks ====
The traditional drinks are xtabentun, balché, drunk of anise, pozole with the Coco, tiger nut milk, cornflour drink of new maize and refreshments made from regional fruits.
