= Juan Miguel de Agüero =

16th-century Spanish architect (died 1610)

Juan Miguel de Agüero was a 16th-century Spanish architect from Santander who participated in the design and construction of the Mexico City Metropolitan Cathedral, the Mérida Cathedral, and the fortifications of Havana, Cuba.

== Biography ==
Juan Miguel de Agüero was born in Trasmiera, Cantabria. Juan Miguel de Agüero spent time in Santander, Havana Cuba, Mexico City, and Yucatan. He died in Mexico City, Mexico in 1610. His style was consistent with 17th century Spanish architectural design.

== Education ==
Juan Miguel de Agüero received his education in Spain and became a Master Builder. Juan Miguel de Agüero was also a distinguished Spanish military architect.

== Artworks ==
=== Mexico City Metropolitan Cathedral ===
Juan Miguel de Agüero’s worked on the Mexico City Metropolitan Cathedral, located in Mexico City, Mexico. Cladio de Arciniega drew up the plans for the cathedral while Juan Miguel de Agüero built the model for the cathedral. The construction of the cathedral started in 1573 and finished in 1813. A majority of the first walls of the cathedral were built by Juan Miguel de Agüero. The Mexico City Metropolitan Cathedral was built on top of Templo Mayor, which was a temple that the Aztecs used before the colonization of Tenochtitlan. The central dome is 65 meters high and is supported by four columns. The two towers are 60 meters in height. The church is 60.40 meters wide and is about 25 meters high along the central nave and 126.67 meters long. The building of the cathedral took 240 years for it to be finished, which puts Juan Miguel de Agüero in a long list of architects, master builders and construction teams. The cathedral is in the style of Gothic architecture, but has other styles of architecture due to the amount of time it took to build. Other types of architecture styles we find on the cathedral are Baroque, Churrigueresque, Neo-classical and Neo-Renaissance. The cathedral is made of material surrounding the Temple Mayor such as tezontle, tenayocatele, remedios, and chiluca. The main stones for the cathedral consisted of tezontle, tuff stone, an andesite. The vision for the cathedral was used to consolidate power in the newly founded territory the Spaniards conquered. Through the building of the cathedral, the Spaniards were able to enforce Catholicism amongst the Aztecs.

=== Cathedral of Merida Yucatan ===
Juan Miguel de Agüero was also a part of the construction of the Merida Cathedral. The Merida Cathedral is located in Merida, Yucatan. Juan Miguel de Agüero worked on the final construction of the vaults to the Merida Cathedral. The Merida Cathedral was started by Don Pedro de Aulestia during 1561 and was finished in 1585 . This cathedral was one of the first completed cathedrals in the Americas. The cathedral stands at 142 feet tall and is made out of stone and recycled stone from Mayan ruins. Unlike the Mexico City Metropolitan Cathedral's different styles of architecture, the Merida Cathedral is designed in a Gothic style. The intent of the cathedral was used to consolidate power in the newly founded territory the Spaniards conquered and to spread the Catholic religion across the Americas.

=== Fortifications of Havana Cuba ===
Juan Miguel de Agüero was also a part of the construction of fortifications of San Cristobal in Havana.

== Exhibitions ==
=== Vaults of the Cathedral of Merida ===
Upon the death of Pedro de Aulestia, several older teachers replaced him, the last of them being Juan Miguel de Agüero. He arrived from the capital of New Spain to Yucatán around 1581. During this time, the construction of the Cathedral of Merida was underway and the vaults were next to be constructed, which Agüero was responsible for building the vaults. Juan Miguel de Agüero's vault is located in the side nave of the cathedral above the south entrance. The set of lowered vaults encased in the Serlio style, was inspired by the guilt of the Pantheon of Rome. The drawings of the Pantheon of Rome were published by Villalpando in 1563 in his translation of Serlio's treatise, and the Herrerian style covers. By this time, most of the stone pieces of the cathedral would have been carved. Aguero undoubtedly possessed the geometric knowledge to interpret the existing patterns of the original Aulestia design, thus allowing him to carry out the implementation of the vaults of the Emeritus cathedral.

=== Vaults of the Mexico City Metropolitan Cathedral ===
Juan Miguel de Agüero was in charge of the elevations of the Mexico City Metropolitan Cathedral. Juan Miguel de Agüero was responsible for fulfilling the traditional function of the cathedral building. He was also liable for preserving the long naves, while also simplifying the plan and construction elements. Between 1600 to 1626, Juan Miguel de Agüero constructed stone rib vaults to the cathedral.
