= American Capital of Culture =

Latin American and Caribbean initiative

The non-governmental organization American Capital of Culture selects one city or state in the Americas annually to serve as the American Capital of Culture for a period of one year. The organization's leaders claim the initiative is based closely on the European Capital of Culture program; it enjoys the backing of the Organization of American States, but the OAS is not involved in the selection process.

The organization was founded in 1998 with the objectives to raise awareness of culture in the Americas and to promote the city selected as the Capital of Culture for the year. The chosen city is publicized on the television networks Antena 3 and the Discovery network.

While the NGO claims that the designation "is aimed at all the countries of the Americas", as of 2024 the 26 locations (includes two in 2003) designated as the American Capital of Culture have only been chosen from Latin America and the Caribbean. Furthermore, the designation has increasingly become Mexico-centric; Mexico has dominated the program since 2014, being given the designation six times in the 11 years from 2014 to 2024.

== List of dates of American Capital of Culture ==
American Capitals of Culture
Year	City	Country
2000	Mérida	Mexico
2001	Iquique	Chile
2002	Maceió	Brazil
2003	Panama City	Panama
2003	Curitiba	Brazil
2004	Santiago	Chile
2005	Guadalajara	Mexico
2006	Cordoba	Argentina
2007	Cuzco	Peru
2008	Brasília	Brazil
2009	Asunción	Paraguay
2010	Santo Domingo	Dominican Republic
2011	Quito	Ecuador
2012	São Luís	Brazil
2013	Barranquilla	Colombia
2014	Colima	Mexico
2015	Mayagüez	Puerto Rico
2016	Valdivia	Chile
2017	Mérida	Mexico
2018	Anzoátegui	Venezuela
2019	San Miguel de Allende	Mexico
2020	Punta Arenas	Chile
2021	Estado de Zacatecas	Mexico
2022	Ibagué	Colombia
2023	Aguascalientes	Mexico
2024	Nayarit	Mexico
2025	San Luis Potosí	Mexico
2026	Puebla de Zaragoza	Mexico

== See also ==
- Arab Capital of Culture – Arab League effort to promote and celebrate Arab culture
- European Capital of Culture – Cities recognized by the European Union as culturally significant for Europe
- University Network of the European Capitals of Culture – International non-profit association
