= Cathedral of Mérida, Yucatán =

Cathedral in Mérida, Yucatán, Mexico

Mérida Cathedral
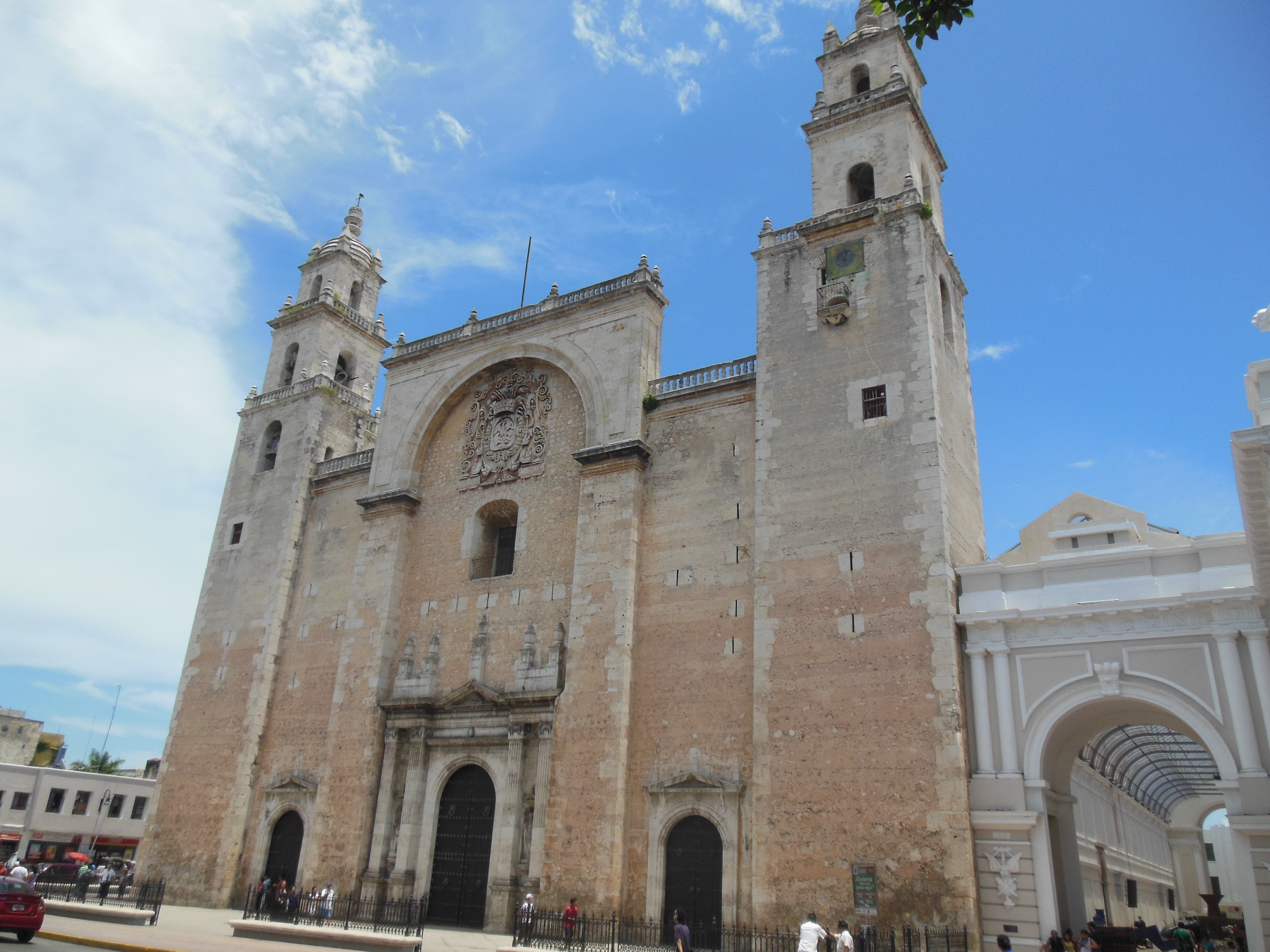
- The Mérida Cathedral

Religion
- Affiliation: Roman Catholic
- Status: Preserved

Location
- Location: Mérida, Yucatán, Mexico.
- Interactive map of Mérida Cathedral
- Coordinates: 20°58′1.64″N 89°37′21.32″W

Architecture
- Architect: Juan Miguel de Agüero
- Type: Cathedral
- Groundbreaking: 1562
- Completed: 1598
- Materials: Stone

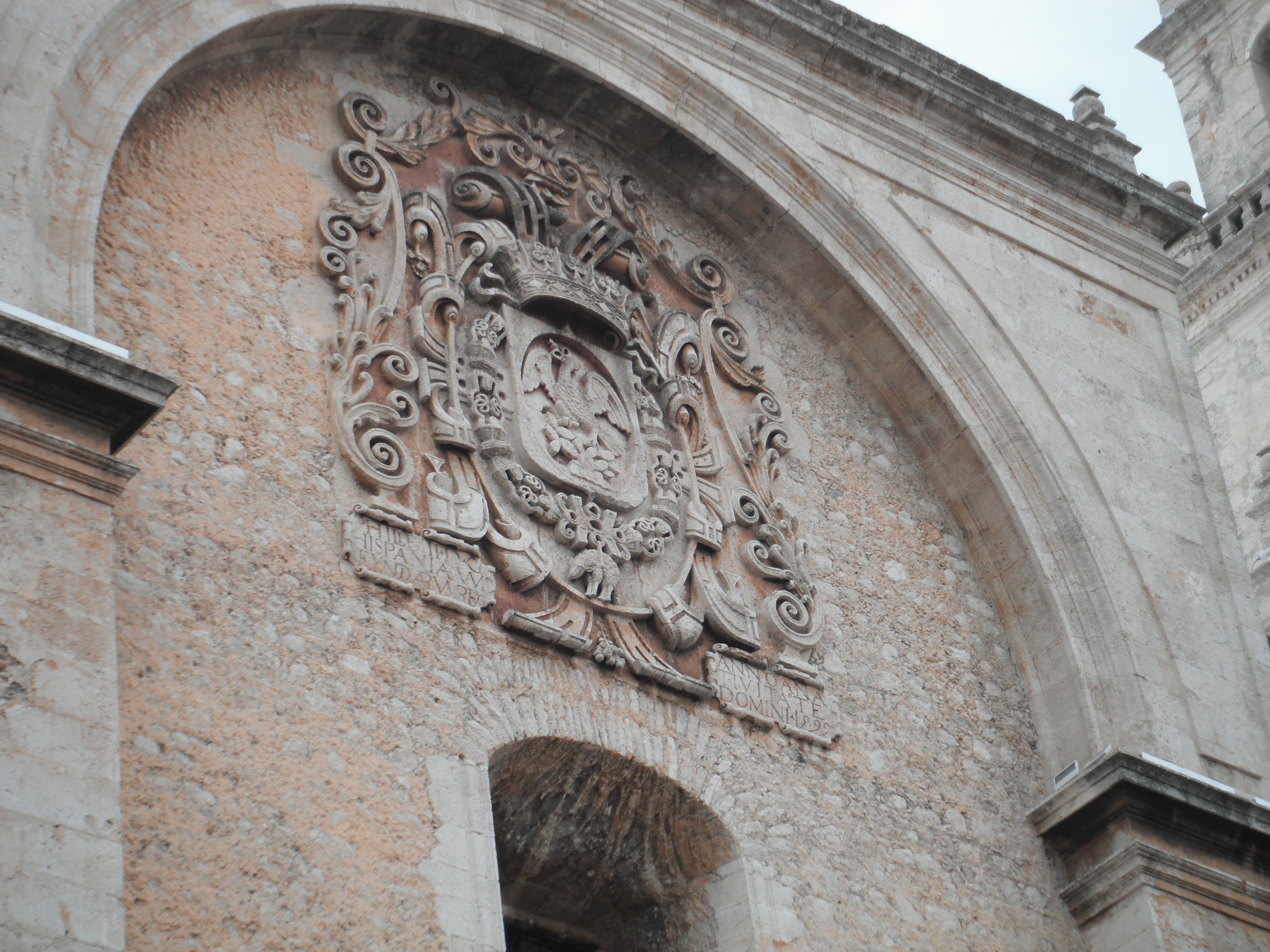
Coat of Arms

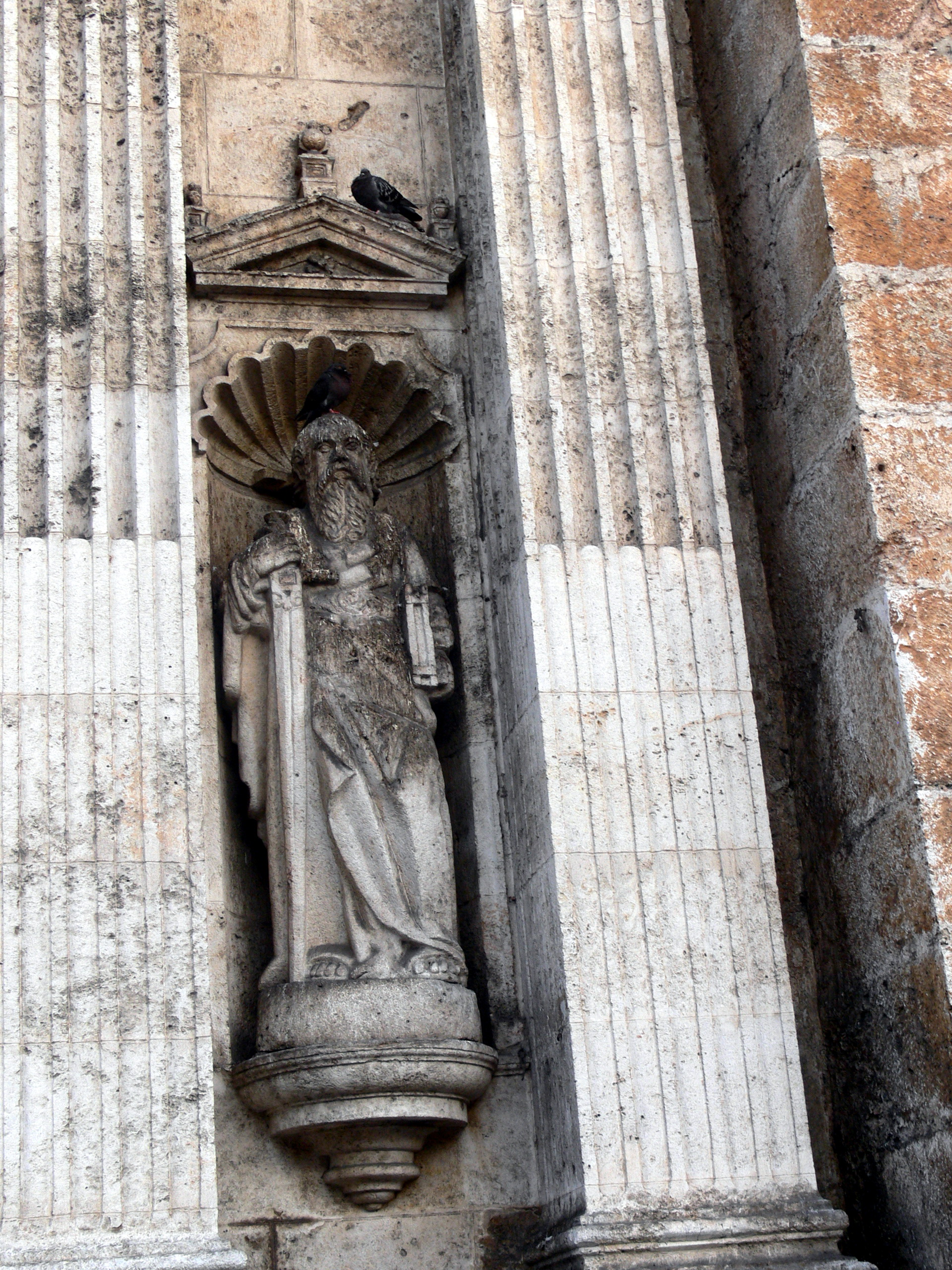
Statue of St. Paul in a niche

The Mérida Cathedral in Mérida, Yucatán, Mexico, is one of the oldest cathedrals in the Americas.

== History ==
Construction of the cathedral of Mérida began in 1561, and it was completed in 1598. It was the second cathedral to be completed in the Americas (the Cathedral of Santo Domingo, completed in 1550, was the first). It is a unique monument with clear antecedents in Andalusia. The seat of the bishopric of Yucatán, the cathedral was built on the site of Mayan ruins T'ho.

The bishopric of Yucatán had an uncertain start. The Yucatán peninsula was explored by Francisco Hernandez de Córdoba and Juan de Grijalva on behalf of Diego Velazquez de Cuellar, the adelantado of Cuba, in 1517 and 1518. The creation of a diocese in the recently discovered country was urged by Velazquez, who presumed to have jurisdiction over the region and hoped to colonize it. An episcopal see known as "Carolense" was indeed created by Pope Leo X in 1519 (later renamed "Our Lady of Remedies" by Clement VII). But said diocese was not implemented in the territory of Yucatán but in that of Tlaxcala instead and later on was moved to Puebla. It cannot therefore be considered the predecessor of the diocese of Yucatán.

The diocese of Yucatán proper, named "Yucatan and Cozumel," was created by Pius IV in 1561. St. Ildephonsus of Toledo was invoked as the patron. Two prelates for the new see were nominated in succession by the Spanish Crown but neither could be consecrated for entirely accidental reasons. A third candidate, fray Francisco Toral, was eventually consecrated and took possession on August 14, 1562. He was the first of a long line of bishops, later archbishops, of Yucatán.

The system of vaulting used throughout the building was based on the ideas of Andres de Vandelvira, first applied to the building of the cathedral of Jaen. Indeed, there is every possibility that Vandelvira's schemes were brought to the Mérida project by the first bishop of Yucatán, fray Francisco Toral, who hailed from Ubeda, a town in the Jaen province.

References to the cathedral can be found in the Books of Chilam Balam.

== Construction ==
Land had been set aside for the cathedral at Mérida, the place recycled by the Spanish under Francisco de Montejo as the capital of the new colony. The colonial city was set amidst the ruins of the Maya settlement of Ichcansiho (T'ho for short), and work for the church was begun shortly after Toral's arrival. The church was to be built on the eastern side on the main town square, where a temporary building with a roof of palms was erected. It was not until 1562 that construction of the cathedral began. Labor for this construction came from Mayans, some of whom still practiced their own religion. Laborers used stones from the Mayan temple of Yajam Cumu to build the cathedral. Two known Mayan workers were Francisco Pool, and Diego Can. Although architect Juan Miguel de Agüero completed the cathedral, it was Don Pedro de Aulestia who led the initial construction.

== Coat of Arms ==
The coat of arms on the cathedral facade was originally designed to reflect the Spanish royal coat of arms. The original royal coat consisted of four sections containing symbols of gold castles and crowned lions. At the very top of the coat was a representation of the royal crown of Spain. After Mexico's independence, the shield was partially destroyed due to anti-Spanish sentiment. The central piece of the shield containing the castles and lions were removed using a pickaxes and chisels. In 1824, the empty shield was filled with a Mexican eagle wearing the imperial crown of Iturbide. After the redesign of the shield, a second wave of anti-Spanish sentiment led to the entire coat of arms being buried beneath a slab of cement. The cement was later removed to reveal the coat of arms as can be seen today.

== St. Peter and St. Paul ==
On the cathedral facade there are statues of St. Peter and St. Paul. The statue of St. Paul is distinguished by the sword and the book he is holding. St. Peter is depicted holding the keys to the Church.

== See also ==
- 16th-century Western domes
