= Museum of the City of Merida =

Coordinates: 20.9647°N 89.6210°W

The Museum of the City of Merida (Spanish: Museo de la Ciudad de Mérida), located in Mérida, Yucatán, Mexico, is home to artifacts and archeological pieces of historical relevance to the development of the city, from pre-Hispanic to contemporary times. The building in which the museum lies is also of historical importance, since it dates back to the period of the Porfiriate.

== History ==
The current headquarters of the Museum of the City constitutes an element of large importance for Mérida not only by its architectural style that stands out from the surrounding buildings, but also for its historical value. This Federal Palace was inaugurated at the end of the Porfirio on May 5, 1908 under the Mandate of the governor Enrique Muñoz Arístegui. Inside the museum offices of telegraphs, posts and courts have been established. Designed and built by the Military Engineer Salvador Echegaray distinguished by his neoclásic style, it resonates with the French style, giving some modern tones in the finishing of the walls and aluminum works.

Inside the museum is an exhibit of representative objects that mark the period during which it served for the postal service.

== Exhibition rooms ==
In the museum, there are exhibitions containing 150 pieces of permanent form that vary from pieces of great historical value to archaeologic pieces. All these pieces are distributed in four main rooms, as detailed below.

=== Prehispanic Merida ===
This room contains many pieces that there were in the ancient Merida of the previous period to the conquest of the Spaniards. It even houses pieces that date to the Maya civilization.

=== The colony or Novohispanic Merida ===
This is the room in which they begin to present objects that trace back to the period of the Merida's foundation as well as objects of the daily life of the period, armament and other pieces that show to Mérida during the Colony.

=== Merida in the 19th century and principles of the XX ===
In this room, there are artifacts that represent the development of the city and its economic growth. Other pieces refer to the period of the inland revenues, education, and political atmosphere of this time.

=== 20th century ===
In this room, there are objects of the current life of Merida relevant not only to the culture of the city but also to the architecture, sports, and especially the traditions of the city.

== Temporary exhibitions ==
The temporary exhibitions generally take place in the first floor of the Museum. These exhibits usually showcase various visual arts, through different media like painting, drawing, printmaking, recordings, photography, sculpture and video. Also, they create thematic exhibitions that reveal more of the history of Merida.
