= Mérida Institute of Technology =

Education institute

Coordinates: 21°00′44″N 89°37′20″W

- Instituto Tecnológico de Mérida
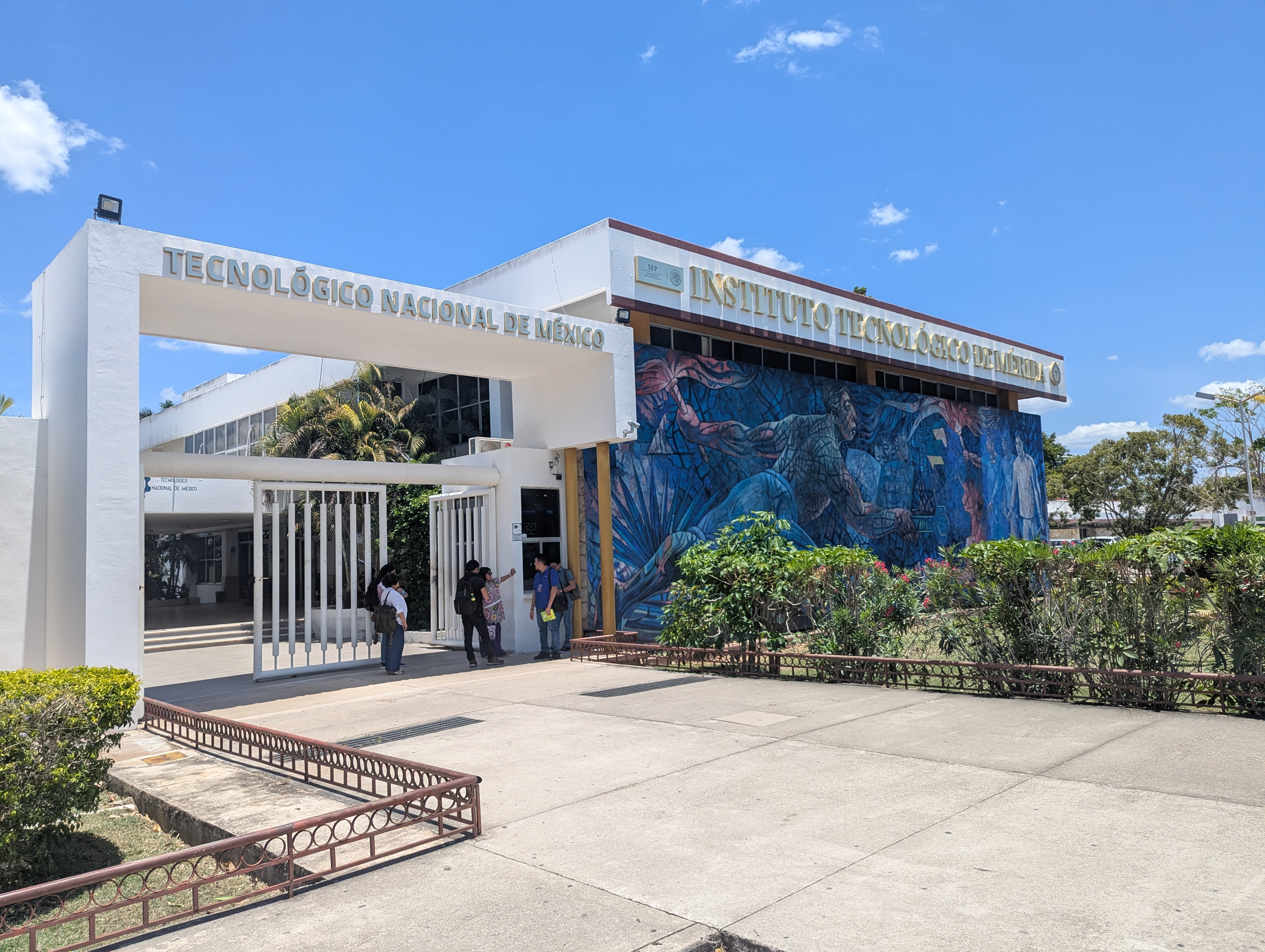
- Established: 1961
- Location: Mérida, Yucatan, Mexico
- Website: www.itmerida.mx

The Mérida Institute of Technology (Spanish: Instituto Tecnológico de Mérida, ITM) is a public institution of higher education located in Merida, Yucatan, Mexico. Established in 1961, it has two campuses.
