= Salbute =

Tortilla dish from the Yucatán peninsula

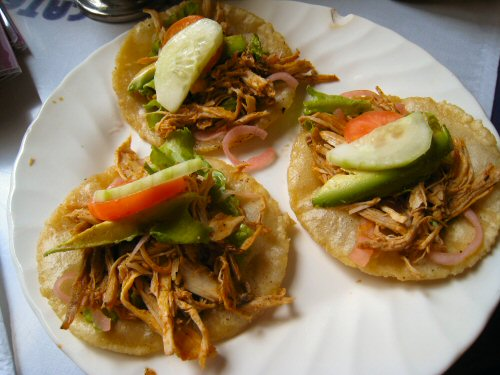
Salbutes

A salbut (pl. salbutes, from Yucatec Maya sáal 'light' and buutʼ 'stuffed') is a puffed deep fried tortilla that is topped with lettuce, sliced avocado, pulled chicken or turkey, tomato and pickled red onion. Salbutes originate from the Yucatán Peninsula and are a staple in Belize.

Salbutes are mostly sold in the evenings when parties of friends or family go out to eat. They are served at fast food restaurants called panucherias which also serve panuchos, tostadas, tortas, and caldos. Salbutes are fried and topped to order and often served with soda drinks.
