= Panucho =

Tortilla dish from the Yucatán peninsula

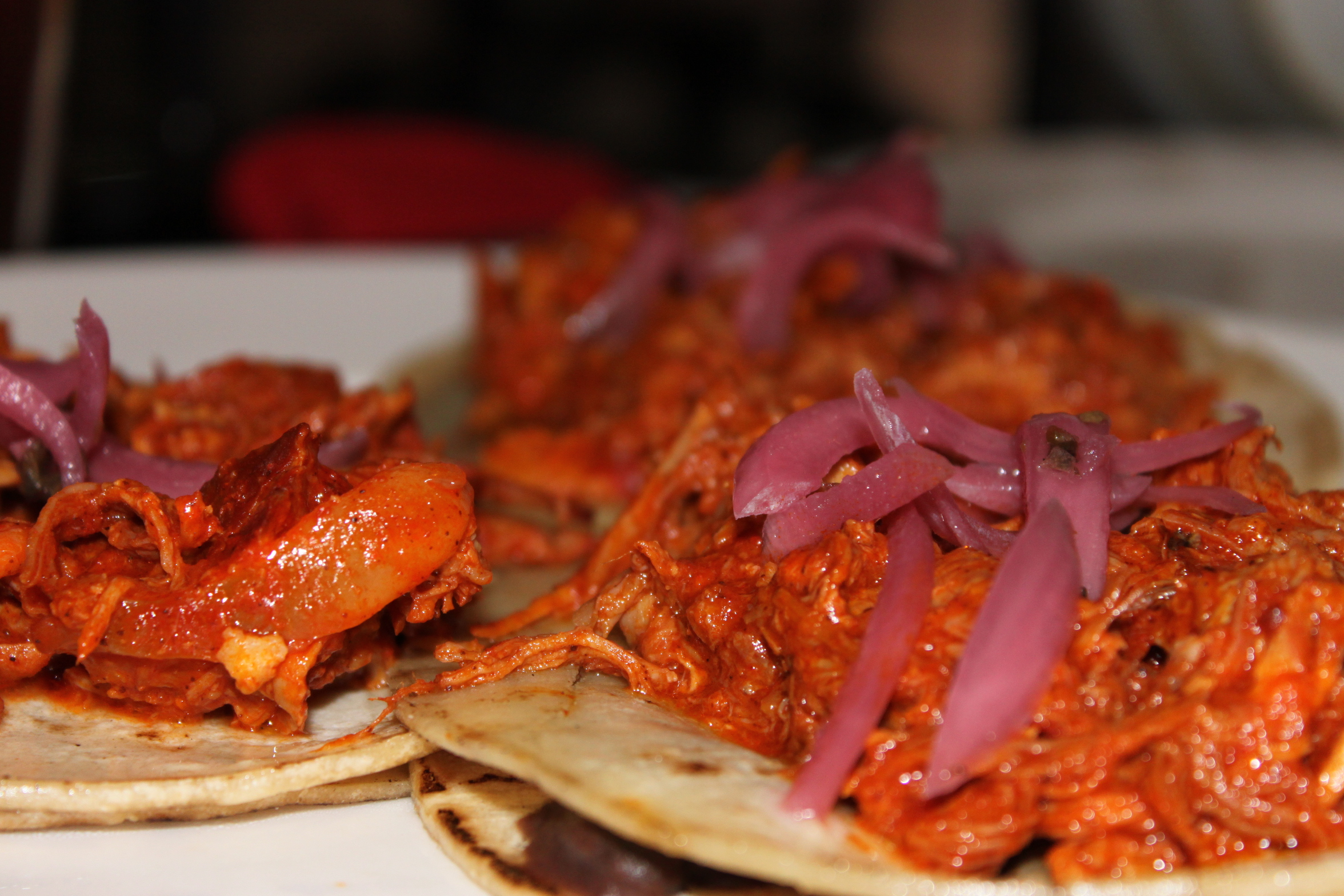
Panuchos

A panucho is a Mexican food specialty from Yucatán made with a refried tortilla that is stuffed with refried black beans and topped with chopped cabbage, pulled chicken or turkey, tomato, pickled red onion, avocado, and pickled jalapeño pepper. It is occasionally topped with eggs in some variations.

Panuchos are mostly sold in the evenings when parties of friends or family go out to eat. Panuchos are served at fast-food restaurants called panucherias which also serve salbutes, tostadas, tortas, and caldos. Panuchos are fried and topped to order and often served with soda.
