= 2007 Yucatán gubernatorial election =

Election in Mexico

The 2007 gubernatorial election in the Mexican state of Yucatán was held on May 20, 2007, as part of the larger Yucatán state election. Ivonne Ortega Pacheco of the Institutional Revolutionary Party (PRI) was elected Governor of Yucatán for a six-year term.

== Election results ==
Yucatán Gubernatorial Election 2007
Party	Candidate	Votes	%
PRI with PVEM and PAY	Ivonne Ortega	421,035	49.92
PAN with PANAL	Xavier Abreu	358,116	42.46
PT and Convergence	Ana Rosa Payán	27,126	3.21
PRD	Héctor Herrera Álvarez	22,496	2.66
PSD	Jorge Lizcano Esperón	1,347	0.15
Total votes		843,334	100.0
