= Víctor Cervera Pacheco =

Mexican politician

Víctor Cervera
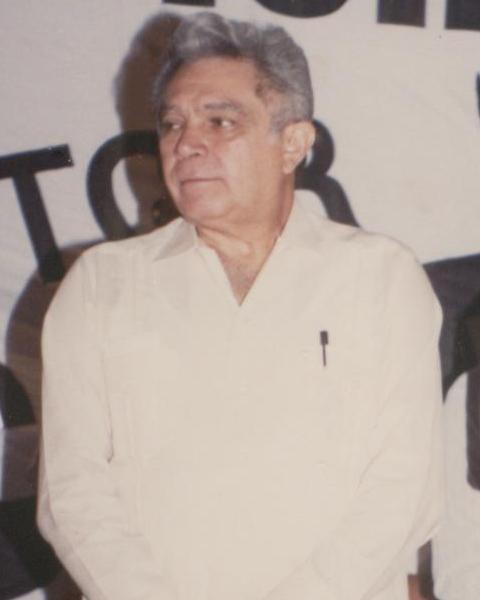
- Cervera during his 1995 gubernatorial campaign

Governor of Yucatán
- In office 1 August 1995 – 31 July 2001
- Preceded by: Federico Granja Ricalde
- Succeeded by: Patricio Patrón
- In office 16 February 1984 – 31 January 1988
- Preceded by: Graciliano Alpuche Pinzón
- Succeeded by: Víctor Manzanilla Schaffer

Secretary of Agrarian Reform
- In office 1 December 1988 – 30 November 1994
- President: Carlos Salinas de Gortari
- Preceded by: Rafael Rodríguez Barrera
- Succeeded by: Miguel Limón Rojas

Personal details
- Born: 23 November 1936 Dzemul, Yucatán, Mexico
- Died: 18 August 2004 (aged 67) Mérida, Yucatán, Mexico
- Party: PRI
- Spouse: Amira Hernández Guerra
- Children: 4
- Relatives: Ivonne Ortega Pacheco (niece)

Víctor Manuel Cervera Pacheco (23 November 1936 – 18 August 2004) was a Mexican politician who served as the interim Governor of Yucatán from 1984 to 1988, and again in an elected capacity from 1995 to 2001. A member of the Institutional Revolutionary Party (PRI), Cervera also served as Secretary of Agrarian Reform under President Carlos Salinas de Gortari from 1988 to 1994.

== Biography ==
Víctor Manuel Cervera Pacheco was born on Dzemul, Yucatán on 23 November 1936. (Note: There is some disagreement over Cervera's date and location of birth. Some sources cite his location of birth as Dzemul, while others state that he was born in Mérida. Some have also given his date of birth as 23 April 1936, but according to La Jornada, Cervera said that 23 November was his "official" birthdate, while 23 April was "political", having been created for his first campaign.) He was the son of Juan Cervera Reyes and Francisca Pacheco Solís. The area was poverty-stricken due to the decline of the henequen industry, and to make money for his family, Cervera worked as a shoeshine boy in the markets of Dzemul and nearby Mérida. Cervera's elementary and secondary studies were at the Colegio Americano in Mérida, and had preparatory studies at the University of Yucatán, though he did not receive a degree. He became a student leader there, serving as secretary-general of the Society of Preparatory Students in 1953 and then as its president in 1954. He also served as secretary-general of the University Students Association of Yucatán and was a delegate for it at a national convention in Xalapa, Veracruz in 1956.

Cervera was an active member of the Institutional Revolutionary Party (PRI) while an elected official. He served as mayor of Mérida from 1971 to 1973. During his mayorship, he oversaw the paving of Mérida's streets and the expansion of its public lighting network. He also remodeled the parque de Santa Ana in 1972.

He also served as a local deputy in the Congress of Yucatán, a federal deputy (for Yucatán's first district) in 1973–1976 and 1982–1984, and secretary of agrarian reform in the cabinet of President Carlos Salinas de Gortari from 1 December 1988 to 30 November 1994.

In 1981, Cervera attempted to secure the PRI's nomination for the governorship of Yucatán, but he was defeated by General Graciliano Alpuche Pinzón. Alpuche won the election in 1982, but on 16 April 1984, he announced his resignation to Congress. That afternoon, Cervera was announced as interim governor. His term ended on 31 January 1988, and he was succeeded by Víctor Manzanilla Schaffer.

In 1995, Cervera was the PRI candidate for the governor of Yucatán, with his main opponent being Luis Correa Mena of the National Action Party (PAN). The PAN heavily criticized Cervera, dubbing him the "Milošević of the Mayab", and distributed a pamphlet charging that the PRI packed the electoral commission, harassed PAN electoral monitors, and bought votes, as well as citing irregularities at 200 out of 1,527 polling places. Cervera won the election with 250,403 votes, or 48.7% of the vote, defeating Correa and other candidates. He served a second term as governor from 1 August 1995 to 31 July 2001.

Cervera was married to Amira Hernández Guerra, and they had four children. He was the uncle of Ivonne Ortega Pacheco, a future governor of Yucatán. Ortega Pacheco included Cervera's son Víctor Cervera Hernández in her cabinet. He died on August 18, 2004, from a heart attack in the city of Mérida.
