= Ivonne Ortega Pacheco =

Mexican politician

Ivonne Ortega
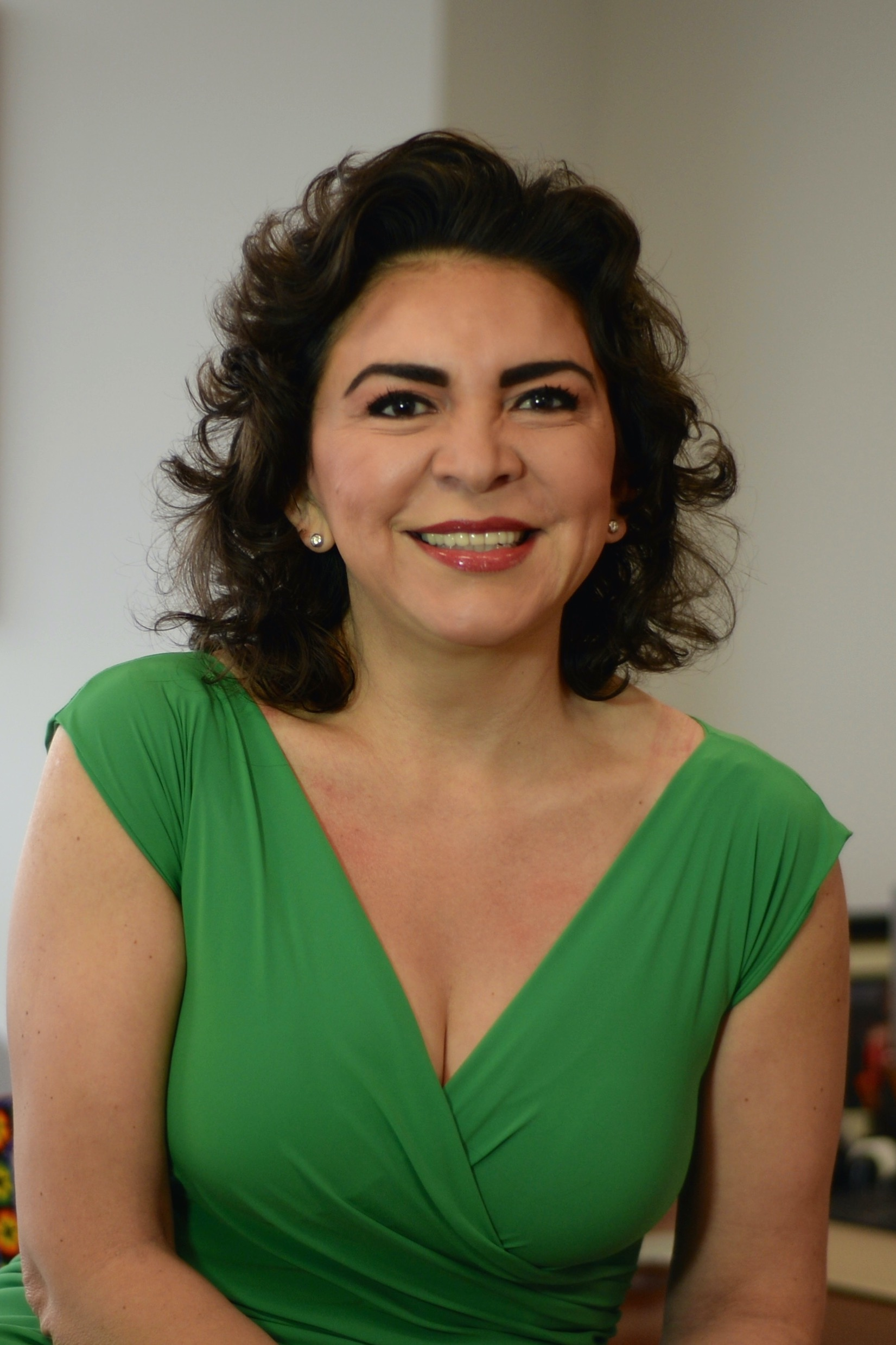
- Ortega in 2016

Member of the Chamber of Deputies Proportional representation
- Incumbent
- Assumed office 1 September 2021
- In office 1 September 2015 – 31 August 2018

Secretary-General of the Institutional Revolutionary Party
- In office 11 December 2012 – 20 August 2015
- Preceded by: Cristina Díaz
- Succeeded by: Carolina Monroy del Mazo

Governor of Yucatán
- In office 1 August 2007 – 30 September 2012
- Preceded by: Patricio Patrón Laviada
- Succeeded by: Rolando Zapata Bello

Senator of the Republic from Yucatán First minority
- In office 1 September 2006 – 26 October 2006
- Preceded by: José Alberto Castañeda
- Succeeded by: Cleominio Zoreda Novelo

Member of the Chamber of Deputies from Yucatán's 2nd district
- In office 1 September 2003 – 31 August 2006
- Preceded by: José Feliciano Moo y Can
- Succeeded by: José Luis Blanco Pajón

Member of the Congress of Yucatán from the 8th district
- In office 1 July 2001 – 30 June 2004
- Preceded by: Raúl Enrique Lara Cano
- Succeeded by: José Luis Blanco Pajón

Mayor of Dzemul
- In office 1 July 1998 – 30 June 2001
- Preceded by: Ricardo Pacheco Ortega
- Succeeded by: Eduardo Librado Chuc Baas

Personal details
- Born: November 26, 1972 (age 53) Dzemul, Yucatán, Mexico
- Party: Citizens' Movement (2020–present)
- Other political affiliations: Institutional Revolutionary Party (1990–2019)
- Spouse: Carlos Cabrera Rivera (m. 2002; div. 2009)
- Children: 1

Ivonne Aracelly Ortega Pacheco (born November 26, 1972) is a Mexican politician from Yucatán and a current member of the Chamber of Deputies. She served as Yucatán's first elected female governor, making her the sixth woman to govern a Mexican state.

Starting her political career in the Institutional Revolutionary Party (PRI), she was elected as the mayor of her birthplace, Dzemul, Yucatán, in 1998. She was elected to the Congress of Yucatán in 2001, Chamber of Deputies in 2003, the Senate in 2006, and as governor of Yucatán in 2007. After her term as governor, she served as secretary-general of the PRI from 2012 to 2015. She was elected again to the Chamber of Deputies in 2015 before running unsuccessfully for the PRI's presidency in 2019. Following her defeat, she left the party and joined Citizens' Movement in 2020, later being re-elected to the Chamber of Deputies in 2021 and 2024.

== Political career ==
Ortega has occupied different positions inside the PRI in Yucatán. In 1998 she was elected municipal president (mayor) of Dzemul, Yucatán. In 2001 she served as local deputy in the Congress of Yucatán and in 2003 she was elected as a federal deputy representing Yucatán's second district. In 2006 she was elected to the Senate, to serve from 2006 to 2012, but she left that position after two months to run for governor of Yucatán in the 2007 Yucatán gubernatorial election. Ortega won the election to serve as governor from 2007 to 2012 (the term was originally set to end in 2013 but a state reform was made to have the state election coincide with the 2012 presidential election). She was inaugurated as governor on August 1, 2007.

=== Candidate for Governor ===
In 2006 she expressed her intention to be candidate of her party for governor of Yucatán in the 2007 elections and asked permission to leave her duties as a senator. Her nomination was a surprise, because she had occupied the post of senator for only two months (with her alternate, Renán Cleominio Zoreda Novelo, sworn in on October 30), and faced candidates with more political history than her.

On December 4, 2006, the PRI's National Executive Committee was presented the results of the Consulta Mitofsky poll conducted between Ortega and five other candidates in the PRI party of Yucatán: Carlos Sobrino Sierra, Erick Rubio Barthell, Dulce María Sauri, Orlando Paredes Lara and Rubén Calderón Cecilio. Ortega was the most favored by the Yucatecans, and consequently was declared a candidate of unity with the agreement of the rest of the candidates. Again her victory was considered a surprise because the former interim governor Dulce María Sauri had been seen as the favorite. On January 13, 2007, she was sworn as the PRI candidate for the governorship of Yucatan.

On February 26 her candidacy was endorsed by the Ecologist Green Party of Mexico and the Alliance for Yucatan Party, which formed a three-party coalition with PRI for the 25 local congressional seats and 106 municipalities.

=== Federal deputy ===
The PRI placed Ortega Pacheco on its list for proportional representation federal deputies from the third electoral region in 2015, sending her to the Chamber of Deputies for the 63rd Congress. She presided over the Communications Committee and also sat on the Constitutional Points and Rules and Parliamentary Practices Committees.

=== Electoral history ===
Yucatán gubernatorial election 2007
Party	Candidate	Votes	%
PRI with PVEM and PAY	Ivonne Ortega	421,035	49.92
PAN with PANAL	Xavier Abreu	358,116	42.46
PT and Convergence	Ana Rosa Payán	27,126	3.21
PRD	Héctor Herrera	22,496	2.66
PSD	Jorge Lizcano	1,347	0.15
Total votes		843,334	100.0

== Alleged corruption ==
=== Unfinished hospital in Tekax, Yucatán ===
In February 2015 Ortega Pacheco was accused by former governor of Yucatán Patricio Patrón Laviada of deviating funds for the construction of a hospital in Tekax in the amount of at least 112 million pesos. Patrón Laviada started the construction of the hospital in 2006, with had an estimated cost of 52.07 million pesos. Leaving the hospital with a progress of 67%, Patrón Laviada left office in 2007, year in which Ortega Pacheco became governor of Yucatan. By 2010 governor Ortega Pacheco had spent more than 100 million pesos on the further construction of the hospital, which she never finished.

In 2016 the governor of Yucatán Rolando Zapata Bello made an investment of 80 million pesos in order to finish the hospital, which was planned to start operations at the end of 2016.

== Controversy ==
=== The Palace of Mayan Civilization: unfinished ===
The Palace of Mayan Civilization, conceived as the first piece of a “Mayan Disneyland” in Yucatán has been abandoned since 2012. About 90 million pesos were spent on the development of the project.

Located 11.5 kilometres of Pisté, the project had 520,000 square meters for its development. In the first stage a parking lot and the foundations for five buildings would be built. This stage received 70 million pesos in federal funds. The second and third stages would have had an estimated cost of 140 million pesos, but in 2012 the project was postponed until 2014, which already had a 50% progress. However, in November 2014, the 13,000 square meters of construction, which started on December 21, 2009, were abandoned and have started to be swallowed by the jungle.

=== Gran Museo del Mundo Maya: financial disaster ===
With a progress of 90%, the Gran Museo del Mundo Maya (Great Museum of the Maya World) was inaugurated in September 2012 by Ivonne Ortega Pacheco. The museum, one of Ortega Pacheco's main projects, proved to be a financial disaster.

Ortega Pacheco informed that the total cost of the building would be of 411 million pesos. However, the state government will have to pay for the construction and operation of the museum 4,643 million pesos during 21 years at a yearly rate of 221.1 million pesos, according to information based on official documents obtained by Mayaleaks.

Political offices
Preceded by Patricio Patrón	Governor of Yucatán; 2007–2012	Succeeded by Rolando Zapata Bello
Preceded by Ricardo Pacheco Ortega	Municipal president of Dzemul; 1998–2001	Succeeded by Eduardo Librado Chuc Baas
