= 2007 Yucatán state election =

Local election in Mexico

Local elections were held in the Mexican state of Yucatán on May 20, 2007. Voters went to the polls to elect on the local level:

- a new Governor of Yucatán to serve for a five-year term;
- 106 municipal presidents (mayors) to serve for a three-year term; and
- 25 local deputies (15 by the first-past-the-post system and 10 by proportional representation) to serve for a three-year term in the Congress of Yucatán.

== Gubernatorial election ==
Nine political parties participated in the 2007 Yucatán state election, originally three parties (PRD, C and PT) decided to run together as a coalition but on February 11, 2007, the PRD decided to withdraw their support to the Convergence-Labor Party candidate.

After losing the candidacy in the PAN primaries, Ana Rosa Payán accepted the candidacy for the Todos Somos Yucatán coalition. 15 members of the PAN were also incarcerated after removing advertising material supporting non-PAN candidates and for exchanging cash for voting cards.

Opposition parties had accused both the federal and state governments of using public funds and publicly funded programs to support the PAN candidate. In response to this issue, the federal government decided to freeze all social programs on May 14, 2007, until after the elections.

Party/Alliance	Candidate
Citizens Alliance (PRI–PVEM–PAY)	Ivonne Ortega Pacheco
PAN–PANAL	Xavier Abreu Sierra
Party of the Democratic Revolution	Héctor Herrera Álvarez
Todos Somos Yucatán (CTSY) (C–PT)	Ana Rosa Payán
Social Democratic Alternative Party	Jorge Lizcano Esperón

== Election results ==
=== Gubernatorial election ===
Candidate	Votes	%
Ivonne Ortega Pacheco	421,035	49.92
Xavier Abreu Sierra	358,116	42.46
Héctor Herrera Álvarez	22,496	2.66
Ana Rosa Payán	27,126	3.21
Jorge Lizcano Esperón	1,347	0.15

=== Congressional elections ===
District	PAN	Citizens Alliance (PRI/PVEM/PAY)	PRD	CTSY (C/PT)	%of votes counted
I Mérida	14,625	11,656	700	2,196	80.20%
II Mérida	13,151	11,868	1,022	2,418	83.00%
III Mérida	19,356	22,189	1,244	2,553	85.80%
IV Mérida	30,541	23,987	1,864	4,576	81.10%
V Mérida	15,852	16,907	1,166	2,110	81.40%
VI Mérida	14,567	16,468	679	1,492	71.10%
VII Umán	15,271	19,369	1,142	796	81.00%
VIII Progreso	17,427	21,361	1,838	1,242	91.40%
IX Motul	19,000	17,279	1,716	1,772	97.10%
X Tizimín	24,079	22,270	3,031	326	94.00%
XI Valladolid	19,464	22,616	873	418	68.10%
XII Tekax	14,455	17,931	2,505	1,003	71.30%
XIII Ticul	18,669	20,423	1,876	1,373	82.50%
XIV Tecoh	16,600	18,165	1,522	597	57.00%
XV Izamal	16,828	19,007	1,414	325	71.00%

== See also ==
- 2007 Mexican elections
