= Ie-Tram Yucatán =

Bus network in Mérida, Yucatán, Mexico and nearby towns

- Logo of Ie-Tram, as part of Va y Ven

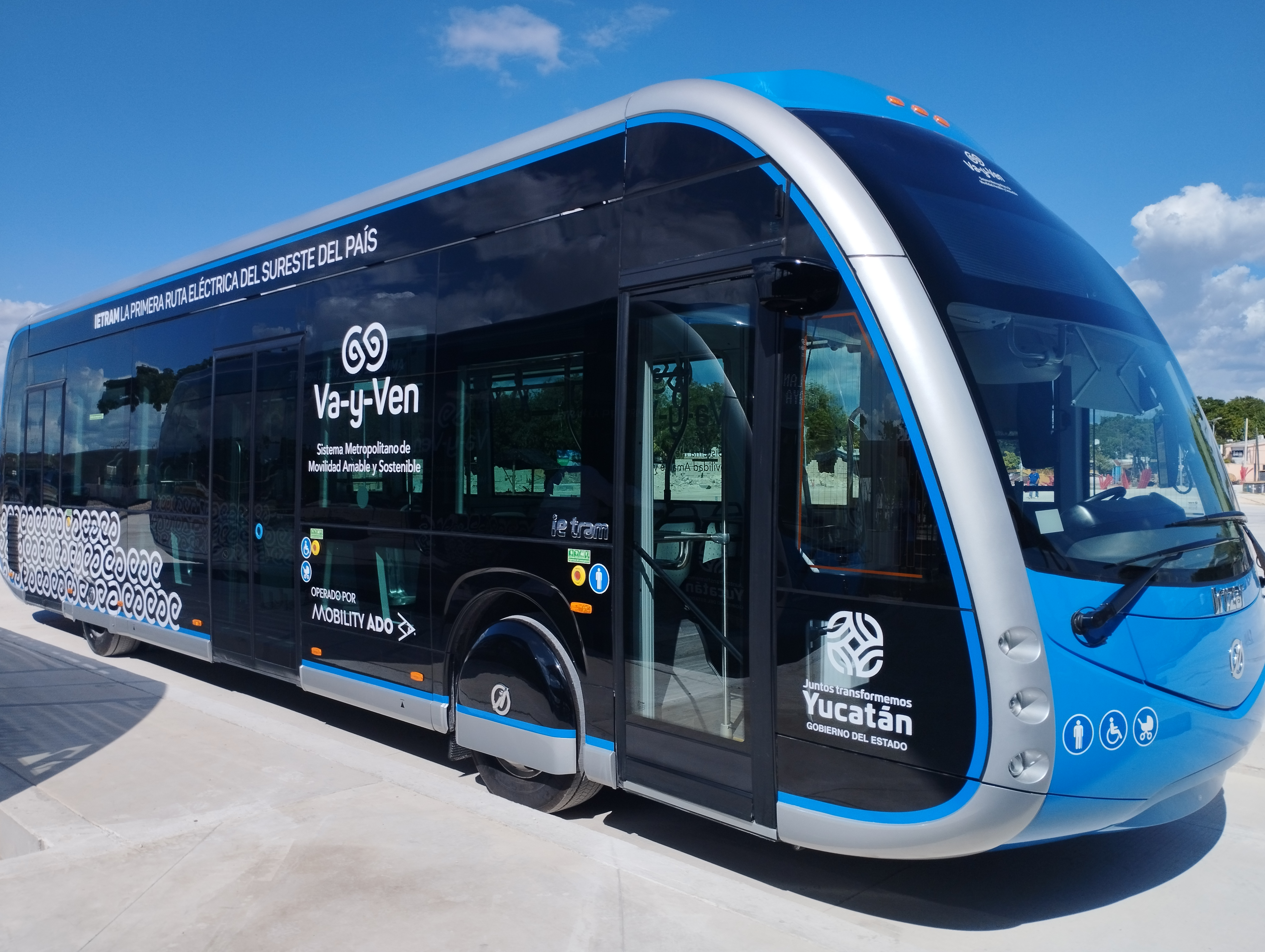
- An Ie-Tram unit in 2023

Overview
- Owner: Agencia de Transporte de Yucatán
- Locale: Mérida, Umán, and Kanasín, Yucatán, Mexico
- Transit type: Bus rapid transit
- Number of lines: 5+1 special events line
- Number of stations: 67
- Website: vayven.yucatan.gob.mx/rutaietram

Operation
- Began operation: 16 December 2023
- Operator: Mobility ADO
- Number of vehicles: 34 battery electric buses

Technical
- System length: 116 km (72 mi)
- Top speed: 90 km/h (56 mph)

The Ie-Tram Yucatán is a bus network in the city of Mérida, Yucatán, Mexico and nearby towns.

Despite the name it is a fully electric bus rapid transit (BRT) network, making Mérida the fourth city in Mexico to have electric buses and the first to have a fully electric BRT system.

The system operates entirely using buses of the Ie-Tram model (named for the system itself), manufactured by the Spanish company Irizar.

When completed the bus network will be 116 kilometers long, and it will feature bus lanes. The network will have 67 bus stops, of which 46 will be in the bus lanes and 21 will be located in the streets. There are terminals near the Tren Maya stations (namely, Teya Mérida and Umán) and a central station located near the new Parque La Plancha.

The Ie-Tram Yucatán began service on 15 December 2023, coinciding with the opening of the connecting Tren Maya.

== History ==
=== Construction ===
The Ie-Tram was constructed on top of old railroad right-of-way that passed within the city of Mérida. These tracks had been out of service since 2020. The system will cost 2,820 million pesos, of which state government of Yucatán will contribute 61% of the investment; the federal government of Mexico, through Banobras, will contribute 23%; and private initiatives will contribute the 16% that will be used for the acquisition of the electric buses.

On 24 January 2023, the governor of Yucatán, Mauricio Vila Dosal, attended the groundbreaking ceremony of the section of the Ie-Tram connecting Teya and Kanasín.

The first stage of construction comprises approximately 5 km that goes from the park of La Plancha on 39th Avenue, to the exit in the Los Heroes division in the periphery of Mérida, being the first of several stages of its construction. This stage includes the removal of the old railway tracks, then the construction of the exclusive lanes, sidewalks, cycleways, traffic lights, improvements of the urban environment, and signs along the route.

The next stages of construction includes the lines to Umán, Poxilá and the Faculty of Engineering.

The buses travel on exclusive, preferential and mixed lanes. The plan also includes charging points for the buses, bus stations, the remodeling of the urban environment and complementary works for the union with other means of transport.

The first two routes, Teya and Kanasin, were completed by August 2023, the month in which the Tren Maya, as well as the connections between the two networks, were tested.

=== Opening ===
The opening of the first line, connecting Parque La Plancha with the Tren Maya's Teya Station, took place on December 15, 2023, at an event held at the Teya Mérida station, made official by the governor of Yucatan Mauricio Vila Dosal and Mexican President Andrés Manuel López Obrador in a parallel event to the inauguration of the first phase of the Tren Maya, and began to provide regular service as of December 16, 2023.

== Lines ==
The Ie-Tram network consists of 5 main lines, as well as a special events line that works only during the games of the Leones de Yucatán baseball team.

Líne	Route number on the Va-y-Ven app	Name	Connections	Length	No. of stations	No. of buses used
		Plancha - Facultad de Ingeniera		16.75 kilometres (10.41 mi)	58	7
		Plancha - Kanasín		30.9 kilometres (19.2 mi)	23	6
		Plancha - Kanasín - Leones (temporary)		32 kilometres (20 mi)	24	6
		Plancha ↔ Estación Teya Tren Maya		14.2 kilometres (8.8 mi)	7	4
		CETRAM La Plancha - CETRAM Umán		28.5 kilometres (17.7 mi)	32	8
		Central - Umán - Tren Maya		33.4 kilometres (20.8 mi)	13	4

== Vehicle fleet ==
The current fleet of the IE-TRAM transport system is 34 zero-emission electric buses with tram aesthetic attributes.

=== Irizar Ie-tram 12m ===
The model used is the standard 12 meters long low floor with the following characteristics:

- 3 entrances/exits on the right side (western).
- Maximum capacity for 105 passengers.
- Ramp and space for wheelchairs and strollers.
- Lithium-ion battery with a range of up to 350 kilometres (220 mi).
- 11 driving and surveillance cameras.
- USB chargers for passengers.
- Air conditioning.

Wifi for passengers.

- GPS real-time geolocator for the Va y Ven app.

== Payment systems ==
It is intended that all public transport in the city of Mérida and its metropolitan area will be approved and fully electronic through the Va y Ven Smart Card, which will also be used on the Va y Ven bus network.

- Blue Card for general passage (MX$12.00)
- Yellow Card for students and seniors (MX$5.00)
- White Card for persons with disabilities (free)

There will be 46 stations where you can make free transfers between Ie-Tram and the different transport routes of the Va and Ven.

=== IE-TRAM ticket ===
For people who do not have a Va y Ven card, they can make use of the IE-TRAM by buying a travel ticket. This payment method is focused on tourists traveling on the Mayan Train who do not have Va y Ven cards.

- Tourist Rate by ticket ($45.00)

Tourist fare tickets are sold at the Umán and Teya stations of the Mayan Train, as well as at the Parque La Plancha station.

== Transfers to other transit modes ==
The Ie-Tram will connect with various other modes of public transit.

- Line 3 connects with the Tren Maya at Teya Mérida railway station.
- Line 5 connects with the Tren Maya at Umán railway station.
- Many stations on the Ie-Tram will connect with the other Va y Ven buses.
- Parque La Plancha Station has a connection with "En Bici", the urban bicycle rental network of the city of Mérida.

== See also ==
- Other bus rapid transit systems in Mexico
