= List of municipal presidents of Mérida =

Head of the municipality of Mérida, Mexico

Municipal President of Mérida
- Mayor of Mérida
- Seal of the municipality of Mérida.

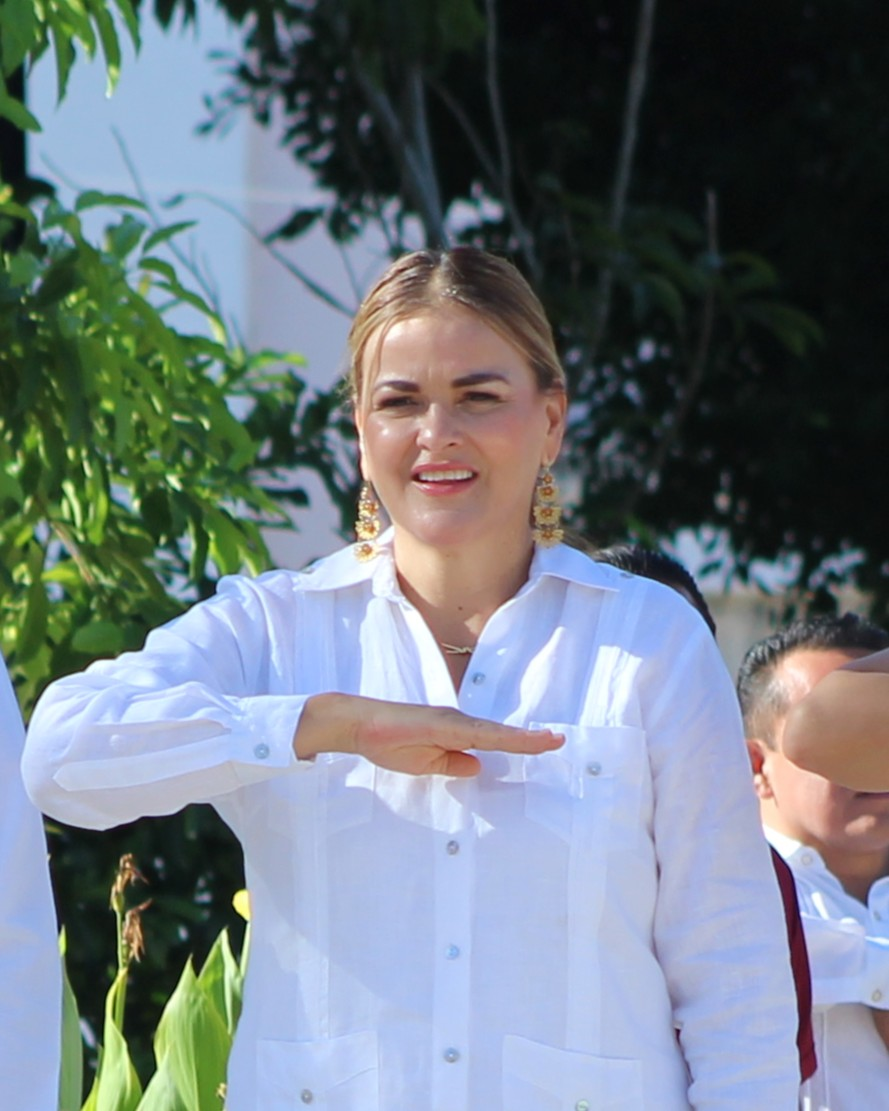
- Incumbent; Cecilia Patrón Laviada since 1 September 2024
- Term length: Three years, renewable once.
- Salary: $116,102 pesos (2015)
- Website: merida.gob.mx

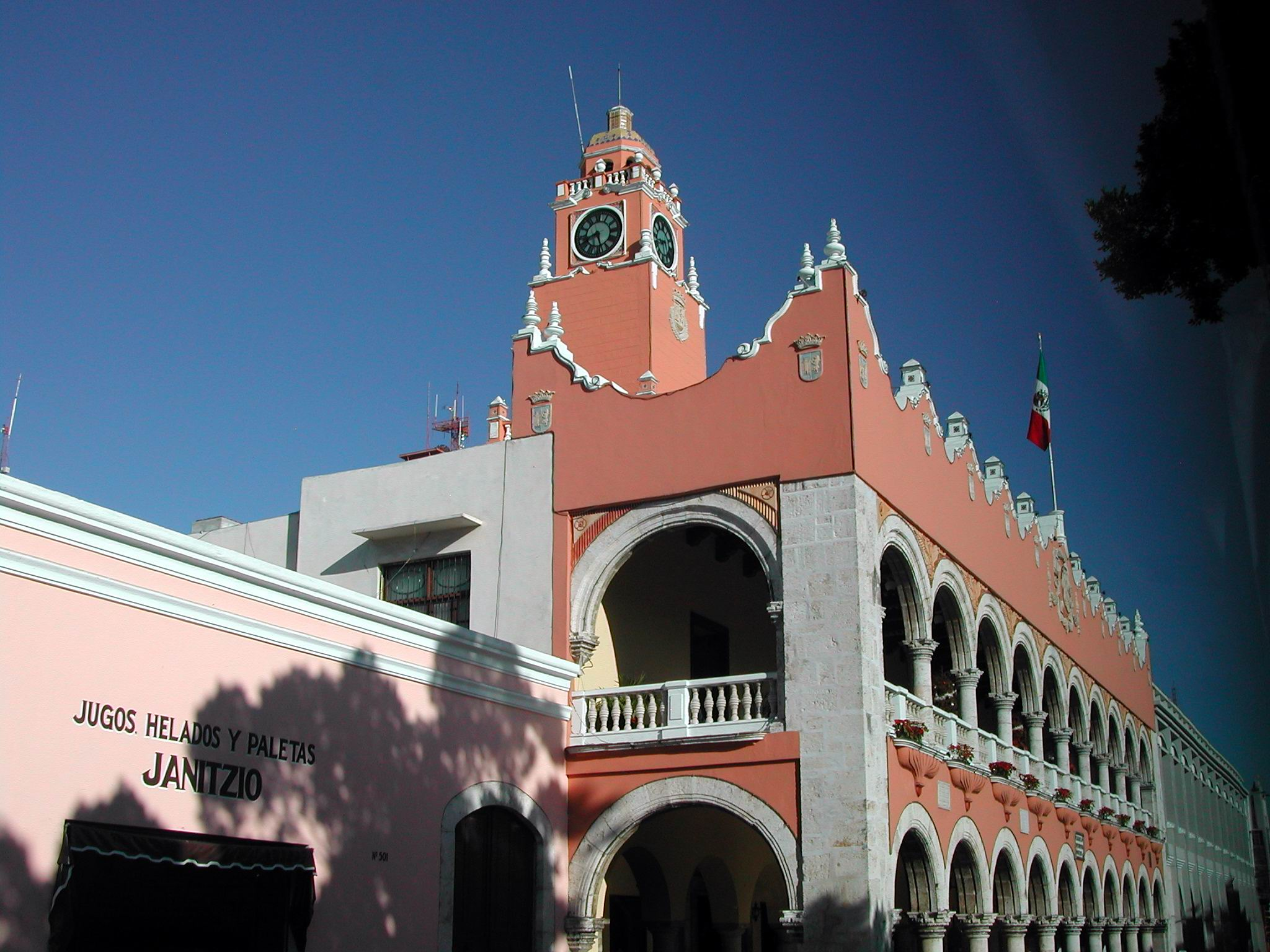
Mérida City Hall, seat of the city council of the Municipality of Mérida and mayor's office. Known as Municipal Palace (Palacio Municipal in the Spanish language).

The Municipal President of Mérida (or Mayor of Mérida in a colloquial sense, because in Mexico the term mayor is not considered as legal) is the person who presides the Municipal Council (Ayuntamiento) and the head-government of the municipality of Mérida, which includes the city of Mérida and its towns inside the municipality. The mayor is elected for a three-year term limited to serve one more term, after the 2015 Mexican constitutional reform. The mayor's office is seated at the Municipal Palace (or City Hall), located at downtown Mérida City.

== Mayors of Mérida since the 1950s ==
This is a list of recent mayors of Mérida, starting from 1948:

=== 20th century ===
| Name | Term in office | Party affiliation | Notes |
|---|---|---|---|
| Pedro Castro Aguilar | 1949 - 1952 | | |
| Fernando Heredia Gonzalez | 1952 - 1955 | | |
| Benjamín Góngora Triay | 1955 - 1958 | | |
| Luis Torres Mesías | 1958 - 1961 | Institutional Revolutionary Party | |
| Mario Esquivel Ancona | 1961 - 1964 | | |
| Armando Carrillo Tenorio | 1964 | | Interim mayor |
| Agustín Martínez Arredondo | 1964 - 1967 | | |
| Víctor Correa Rachó | 1964 - 1969 | National Action Party | He left the office to attend the 1969 gubernatorial elections of Yucatán. |
| Héctor Bolio Pinzón | 1969 - 1970 | National Action Party | Interim mayor. |
| Víctor Cervera Pacheco | 1970 - 1973 | Institutional Revolutionary Party | |
| Wilberth Chi Góngora | 1973 | Institutional Revolutionary Party | Interim mayor |
| Fernando Palma Cámara | 1973 | Institutional Revolutionary Party | Designated by the Governor of Yucatán |
| Efraín Cevallos Gutiérrez | 1973 - 1975 | Institutional Revolutionary Party | |
| Federico Granja Ricalde | 1975 - 1978 | Institutional Revolutionary Party | |
| Gaspar Gómez Chacón | 1978 - 1981 | Institutional Revolutionary Party | |
| Guido Espadas Cantón | 1981 - 1984 | Institutional Revolutionary Party | |
| Herbé Rodríguez Abraham | 1984 - 1987 | Institutional Revolutionary Party | |
| Carlos Ceballos Traconis | 1987 - 1989 | Institutional Revolutionary Party | He was dismissed by the Congress of Yucatán. |
| Tuffy Gaber Arjona | 1989 - 1990 | Institutional Revolutionary Party | Interim mayor |
| Ana Rosa Payán | 1990 - 1993 | National Action Party | |
| Luis Correa Mena | 1993 - 1995 | National Action Party | He left the office to attend the 1995 gubernatorial elections of Yucatán. |
| Ulises González Torre | 1995 | National Action Party | Interim Mayor |
| Patricio Patrón Laviada | 1995 - 1998 | National Action Party | |

=== 21st century ===
| Portrait | Name | Term in office | Party affiliation | Notes |
|---|---|---|---|---|
| | Xavier Abreu Sierra | July 1, 1998 – June 30, 2001 | National Action Party | |
| | Ana Rosa Payán | July 1, 2001 – June 30, 2004 | National Action Party | |
| | Manuel Fuentes Alcocer | July 1, 2004 – June 30, 2007 | National Action Party | |
| | César Bojórquez Zapata | July 1, 2007 – June 30, 2010 | National Action Party | |
| | Angélica Araujo Lara | July 1, 2010 – January 19, 2012 | National Revolutionary Party | She requested license to the office (left the office, under the mexican law) to compete for a seat in the Senate of the Republic during the 2012 Mexican general election. |
| | Álvaro Omar Lara Pacheco | January 20, 2012 – August 31, 2012 | National Revolutionary Party | Interim Mayor |
| | Renán Barrera Concha | September 1, 2012 – August 31, 2015 | National Action Party | First constitutional-elected term. |
| | Mauricio Vila Dosal | September 1, 2015 – January 7, 2018 | National Action Party | He requested license to the office to attend the 2018 gubernatorial elections in Yucatan. |
| | María Dolores Fritz Sierra | January 7, 2018 – August 31, 2018 | National Action Party | Interim Mayor. |
| | Renán Barrera Concha | September 1, 2018 – April 8, 2021 | National Action Party | First constitutional re-election after the 2015 reform, becoming his second constitutional term. He requested license to the office to attend for a re-election during the 2021 local elections in Yucatan. |
| | Alejandro Ruz Castro | April 9, 2021 – July 22, 2021 | National Action Party | Interim Mayor during 3 months. |
| | Renán Barrera Concha | July 23, 2021 – August 31, 2021 | National Action Party | Returned to the office after requesting license. |
| | Renán Barrera Concha | September 1, 2021 – November 5, 2023 | National Action Party | Second constitutional re-election, becoming his third constitutional term. He requested license to the office to attend the 2024 gubernatorial elections in Yucatan. |
| | Alejandro Ruz Castro | November 5, 2023 – August 31, 2024 | National Action Party | Interim Mayor. |
| | cecilia Patrón Laviada | September 1, 2024 – Incumbent. | National Action Party | |

== See also ==
- Municipality of Mérida
