= Va y Ven =

Sistema Metropolitano de Movilidad Amable y Sostenible Va-y-Ven
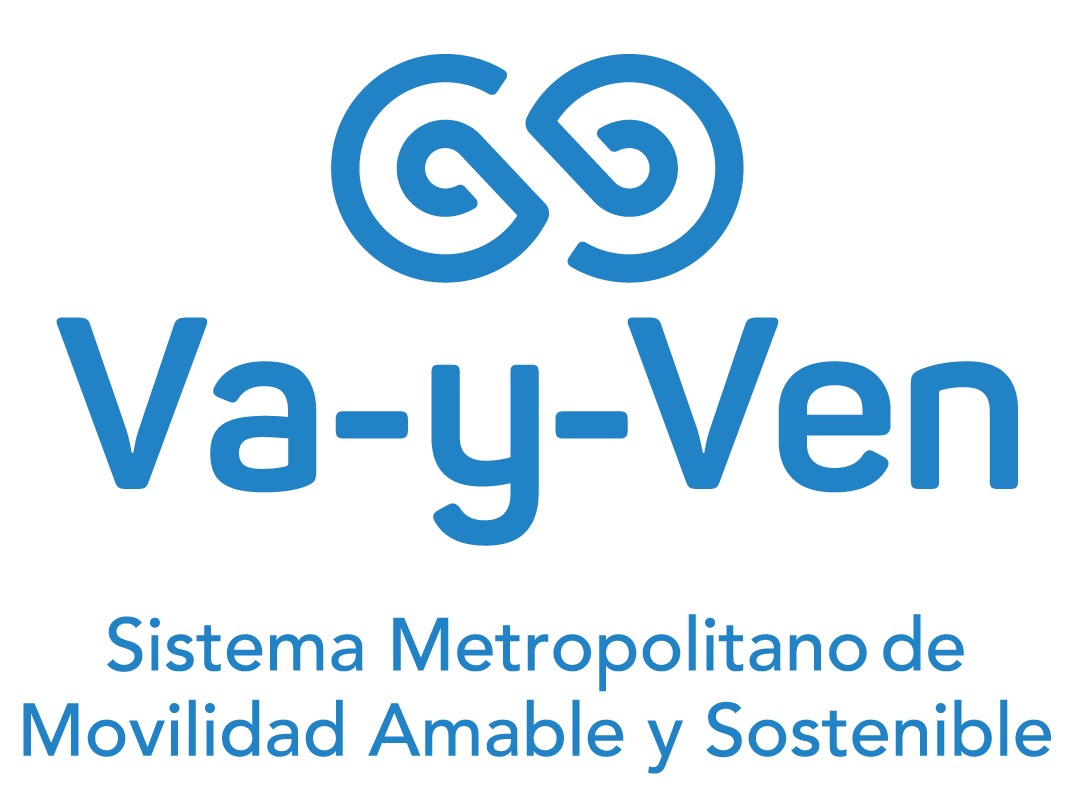

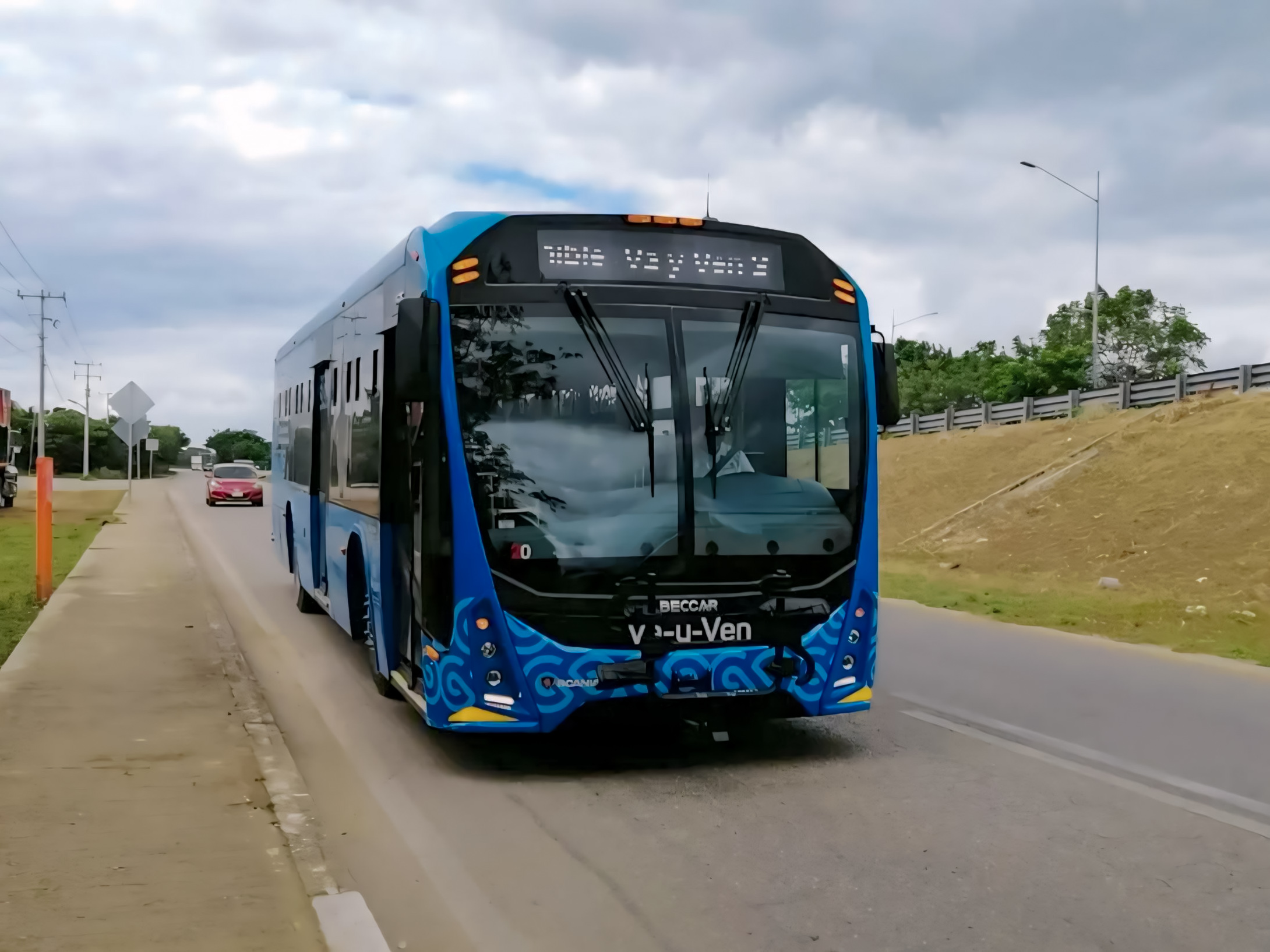

Overview
- Owner: Government of the State of Yucatán
- Area served: Mérida, Umán and Kanasín
- Transit type: Bus
- Website: https://vayven.yucatan.gob.mx/

Operation
- Began operation: 27 November 2021

The Va y Ven Metropolitan System of Friendly and Sustainable Mobility (Sistema Metropolitano de Movilidad Amable y Sostenible Va y Ven, also known as Va y Ven (Come and Go), is a public transportation and urban mobility system in the state of Yucatán, Mexico. It is managed and operated by the Government of the State of Yucatán, which offers urban bus services in the cities of Mérida, Valladolid, Tekax, Tizimín, and Umán. It was inaugurated on November 27, 2021, as a replacement for the Integral Urban Transport System (SITUR; Sistema Integral de Transporte Urbano), this system being replaced in its entirety on January 3, 2023. The system uses rechargeable smart cards for payment and includes services such as night routes and an airport route.

== Rates, payment systems, and service hours ==
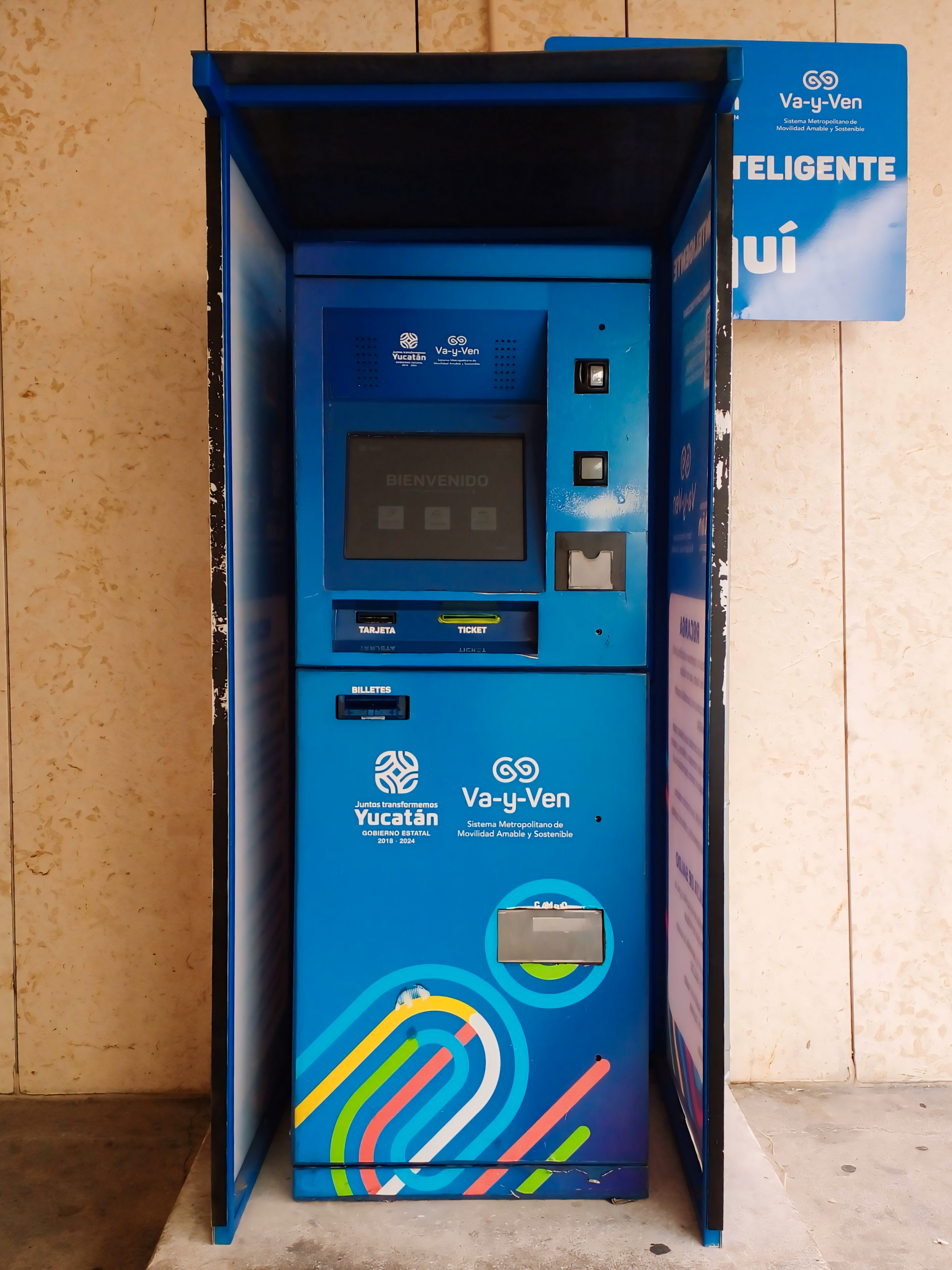
Va y Ven ATM at the Palacio de la Música.

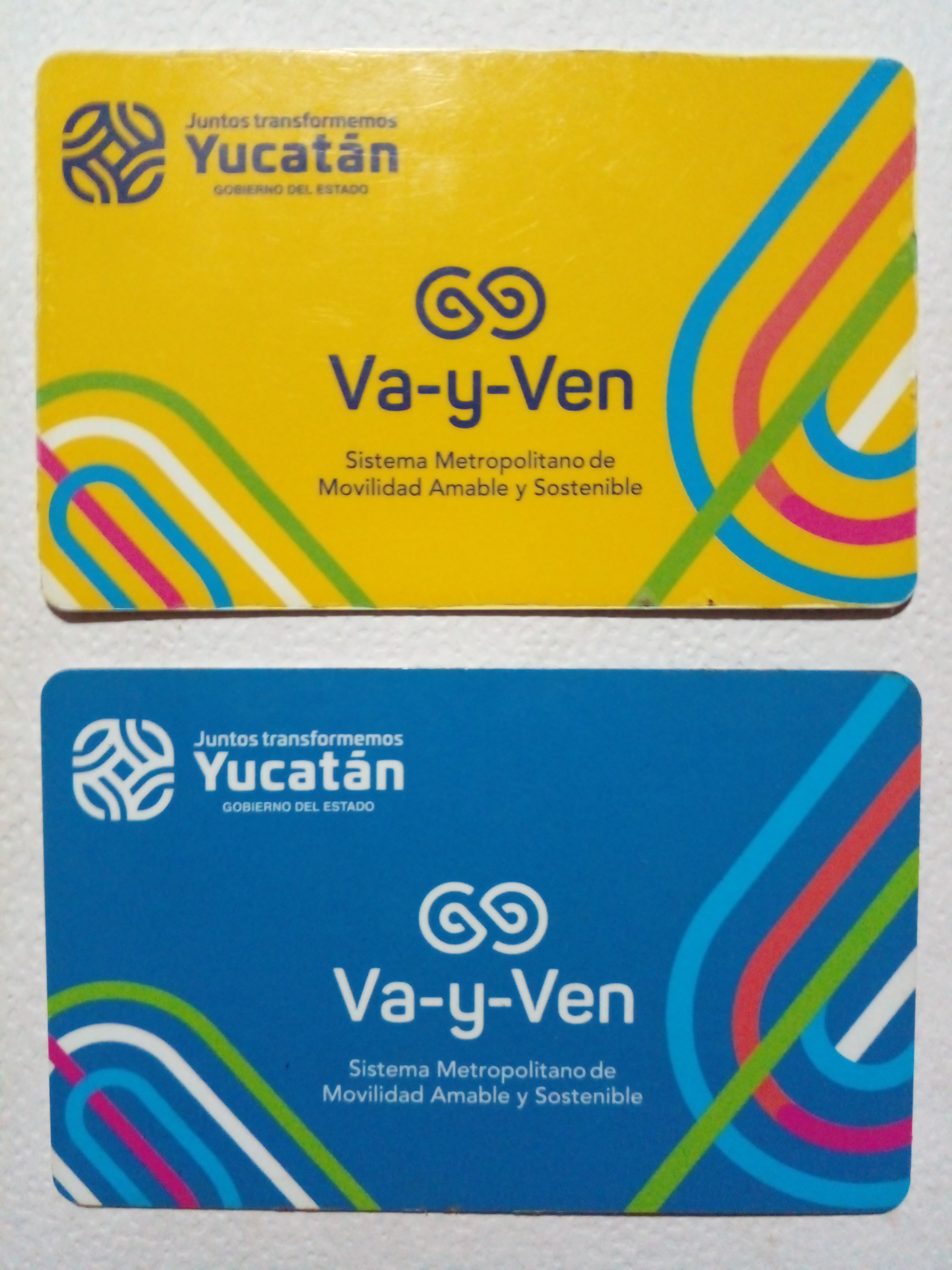
Va y Ven smart cards for the social fare (yellow) and the general fare (blue).

The Va y Ven public transport payment system is carried out using rechargeable smart cards that are recognized by electronic readers known as validators that are arranged on each bus. The general rate is 12 Mexican pesos, and the social rate for students and seniors is 5 pesos, while for people with disabilities it has no cost. General fare cards can be used to pay for multiple users at once, while social cards can only be used to pay for one trip per person and once per unit. The general fare smart cards (green cards) can be purchased at the Va y Ven ATMs, which are located near all the stops of the Peripheral Ring, at the Palacio de la Música and at the TAME terminal of ADO in the historic center of the city of Mérida. These have a cost of 25 pesos. During the first 3 months of the program's service, these were delivered free of charge.

Social rate smart cards (yellow) are exclusive to students who are at least 6 years old, and to senior citizens. These can be purchased at the Va y Ven offices located on 39th Street with Reforma Avenue by delivering the required documentation, which consists of proof of address and INE card for older adults, students must attach a proof of studies and CURP in case they are still minors. They have a free issuance cost if it is the first time it is processed, but in case the user loses it or its validity ends, its replacement will cost 65 Mexican pesos. The validity of the social rate for students can vary depending on the type of school system, older adults and primary and secondary students can process their social rate card with one year of validity, on the other hand, high school and university students can process it with a value of 6 months (if the school system is semester) or 4 months (if the school system is four-monthly) to verify the expiration day specific to the card, must be attached to the validator located in the main aisle, where the exact expiration date can be corroborated.

Social rate smart cards for people with disabilities, a white card (tarjeta blanca), are exclusively for people who have a physical or mental disability, these can be processed at the Va y Ven offices located on Calle 39 with Reforma Avenue by delivering the requested documentation that consists of a proof of address, INE and a certificate of the CREE to be able to process it. It has a free issuance cost if it is the first time it is processed, but in case the user loses it or its validity ends, its replacement will cost 65 pesos. This is valid for one year. Fares on Va y Ven buses and Night Route combis cannot be paid in cash; they only accept payments through the smart card.

The balance of the cards can be checked at the aforementioned ATMs, and recharged at these ATMs, as well as at the OXXO, Dunosusa Groceries, Super AKI, Willys and YZA Pharmacies convenience stores.

The routes have an operating schedule from 5:00 a.m. to 11:00 p.m. The opening hours of the Va y Ven offices are from Monday to Friday from 9:00 a.m. to 4:00 p.m.

=== Social tariff on city buses ===
The social tariff smart card of the Va y Ven system (yellow for younger and older passengers, and white for passengers with disabilities) can be used on vehicles that do not belong to the Va y Ven system to access the social tariffs established by the Institute of Mobility and Territorial Urban Development (Instituto de Movilidad y Desarrollo Urbano Territorial, IMDUT). To do this, the user must place the card in the unit's validator when boarding the bus (as if he were going to pay with the card) and must wait for the validator to authorize the validation, this will happen when it turns on a blue light. The validators of these trucks do not deduct any amount of money from the card. In case the unit does not have a validator or it does not work, the card must be shown to the driver or the camera (if the unit has a camera) to validate the fare.

In the city's buses that do not belong to the Va y Ven system, the general rate is 12 pesos, while the rate for seniors and students is 5 pesos, paid for by presenting the Va y Ven yellow smart card. Meanwhile, riders with disabilities can board for free, as long as they show their credential when boarding. Buses with weather and some agencies (Climabús of the Alianza de Camioneros de Yucatán, A.C.Y or buses of the Rápidos de Mérida) do not accept the social rate.

The student rate is not valid on Sundays, holidays and during the Easter, summer and December holidays, so when boarding the units you will not be able to access the social rate even if the card is shown on routes not incorporated into the Va y Ven.

The social rate is valid 365 days a year on the routes incorporated into the Va y Ven.

=== Electronic payment by smart card and travel discounts ===
To make the electronic payment with the Va y Ven card successfully, the card must be placed in the validator of the unit when boarding it, and it must be left there until it shows a blue light and the type of fare, the amount that was deducted and the balance that remains available on your card appears on the screen.

It is important that the card has the exact amount to pay or more so that you can board the unit, in addition to the general fare card, you can pay for the trip of the people you want as long as you have the necessary balance. Social fare cards only allow the user once per trip per unit.

If sticking the card to the validator does not turn on the blue light, try removing the card, wait a few seconds, and try again. It is possible that a light of different colors may still flash:

- Green light: Indicates that you have misplaced the card or removed it while the validator detected it, so you will have to replace it for it to be charged. usually a message will appear saying "The card could not be detected, try again" (No se ha podido detectar la tarjeta, inténtelo de nuevo)
- Red light: If a red light appears when you paste the card, it is very possible that it is because you do not have enough balance on your card, this can be checked by looking at the screen, you should show a message with the legend "Insufficient balance" (Saldo Insuficiente). To board the unit, you will have to top up the card.
- Red light social fare: For the social farethere are 3 types of signals if the red light comes out when placing the card in the validator, in addition to the "Insufficient Balance". These cases can be:
  1. Fare about to expire: When processing your social tariff smart card, you must corroborate the expiration date, when the card is about to expire, the validator will accept the payments but will show a red light followed by two beeps (as if it were turning blue).
  2. Expired fare: After the expiration date, the validator will show a red light and a long beep will sound, this indicates that the card has lost validity and cannot be used again until you replace it at the Va y Ven offices, you will not be able to use it to pay since only the message "Expired" will appear on the validator screen. It is not necessary to take out a new card, when you take the expired card to the offices, it will be reactivated so as not to lose the balance you have in it.
  3. Rejected card: By placing the social tariff card in the validator, it will disable the possibility of using it again in the same unit. For example, if you get on the CM003 unit of the Metropolitan Circuit and pay with the social tariff card, you will not be able to use your social tariff again in the CM003 unit until the next day. This applies to all Va y Ven routes, including Night Routes. If you try to place the card in a unit where you have already paid with it previously, the payment will not go through and the validator will display a message with the legend "Declined" followed by a red light and a long beep.

The general and social fare cards have exclusive discounts for users who use the Va y Ven units (with the exception of the Airport Route). The discounts work as follows:

- When placing the general or social rate card in the validator, a 2-hour counter will begin, if during those two hours another Va y Ven unit is boarded, 50% of the rate will be deducted; If during the remaining time another unit is boarded, the trip will be free, but this will only apply to the third and fourth trip since after the fourth trip, you will be charged the fare established according to the card.
- The discount does not apply to the same unit, that is, if you swiped your card more than once in the same unit, the discount will not be made and the rate established according to the card will be charged.

== Vehicle fleet ==
High-floor buses are used on the Va and Ven routes:

- Beccar Urviabus Low Entry Scania K250UB Euro 5 and Euro 6 (on the Peripheral Circuit)
- AYCO Metropolitan Scania K250UB Euro 6 (temporarily out of service)
- AYCO Metropolitan, Volvo B8R (Routes within the city and Airport Route), Mobility ADO, Mayan Bus Co (Routes Valladolid).
- Busscar Urbanuss Pluss S Mercedes-Benz O500 U 1928 BlueTec 5 / OH 1621 SB (Metropolitan Circuit), Minis 2000, Urbanos de Mérida, Corporativo Sirus, Líneas Urbe, Minibuses del poniente, Mobility ADO (Red Circuit - Periférico Express)
- Yutong ZK6106CHEVG Hybrid (Routes to the interior of the city and circuito comisarías) Mobility Mérida, Grupo COMI, Turismaya, Corporativo Sirus, CORPA (Tizimín routes)
- Yutong ZK6890HGQ (Circuito Comisarías) CORPA
- Nissan Urvan y Toyota Hiace (night services) service provided by FUTV units. .

In the future for the renewal of more routes units such as Yutong Urban Diesel, Irizar Ie-Tram, Yutong Hybrids, Volvo Access, Yutong Electric Articulated, Kinglong Electric Minibus, Yutong Electric 12m and Mercedes-Benz have been chosen.

== Routes and services ==
=== Airport, Downtown Hotels and CIC Route (Route 701) ===
The airport service connects different areas near the city center of Mérida with the Mérida International Airport. This has a rate of 12 pesos for the social rate and 45 pesos for the general rate.

It can only be approached at the established stops, which are:

- Mérida International Airport (Start and End of route)
- ADO TAME (69 & 68)
- Santa Lucia Park
- Paseo 60
- Plaza Fiesta Americana
- International Congress Centre (CIC)

The schedule of this route is every day from 5:00 a.m. to 10:00 p.m.

=== Night Routes ===
It is a service that has 14 night routes so that the population has public transport service from Monday to Saturday from 10 p.m. to 5 a.m. and Sundays until 1:00 a.m.

Instead of using buses as transportation, they use F.U.T.V. vans with the Palacio de la Música de Mérida as their main base, these can stop and take them at any corner as long as they are within the established route.

The 14 routes are

- 42 Sur - Cielo Alto - Centro
- 60 Sur - Centro
- Umán - Centro
- Tixcacal - Juan Pablo II - Centro
- Canek - Caucel - Centro
- Fco. de Montejo - Fracc. Las Américas - Centro
- Harbor - Centro
- La Isla - Centro
- Cholul - Centro
- Kanasín - Centro
- Brisas - Polígono 108 - Centro
- Fidel Velázquez - Los Héroes - Centro
- Villas de Oriente - Centro
- Linda Vista - Plaza Dorada - H. Juárez - Centro

Information on details of each route can be requested from the smartphone app "Va y Ven"

This has a cost of $15 pesos for the general fare and $5 pesos for the social fare and transfers apply.

=== Ie-Tram Yucatán ===
The IE-TRAM is a bus rapid transit system with electric units, which connect Kanasín and Umán with Mérida and more than 137 neighborhoods.

=== Circuito Periférico ===
The service allows for fast, time- and money-saving trips to different parts of the city's periphery without having to go through the Historic Center, connecting more than 120 nearby neighborhoods and their 104 transportation routes.

In total it has 40 stops and two ways of travel, outside (counterclockwise) and inside (clockwise).

The 40 stops around the ring road are:

- Nora Quintana
- Jacinto Canek
- San Francisco Porvenir
- Tecnológico Poniente
- Chenkú CONALEP III
- Real Montejo
- CRIT
- Facultad de Matemáticas
- Facultad de Ingeniería UADY
- Universidad Marista
- Andrés García Lavín
- Santa Gertrudis Copó
- Cholul
- Motul
- Chichí Suárez
- Los Héroes
- Melchor Ocampo
- Fidel Velázquez
- Francisco Villa Oriente
- Quetzalcóatl
- Vergel
- Kanasín
- Nueva Kukulkán
- Mulchechén
- San Haroldo II
- Centro de rehabilitación infantil
- 42 Sur
- Xmatkuil
- Hospitales/60 Sur
- MAPSA
- Av. 86
- Santa Cruz Palomeque
- El Roble
- Academia de policia
- Diamante Opichén
- Tixcacal
- Fiscalía
- Congreso
- Crío
- ISSSTE susulá

The schedule of this route is every day from 5:00 a.m. to 10:00 p.m.

This has a cost of $12 pesos for the general rate and $5 pesos for the social rate.

=== City routes ===
These are the services that will gradually replace most of the common routes within the city of Mérida, connecting various neighborhoods with the historic center of the city of Mérida. All have a cost of $12 pesos for the general rate and $5 pesos for the social rate. and they have a schedule every day from 5:00 a.m. to 10:00 p.m. In addition, some have transfer stops with Night Routes, that is, their route connects with Night Routes.

The routes that currently exist are:

==== North Zone ====
- Route 55 Mérida - Cholul
- Route 61 C-52 Norte - Villas La Hacienda
- Route 63 Copó - La Isla
- Route 64 Gran Plaza - Montes de Amé
- Route 67 Mérida - Temozón Norte - Chablekal
- Route 69 Tapetes - Sodzil
- Route 70 C-60 Norte - La Plancha - Komchén
- Route 71 Fac. de Ingeniería - Parque Industrial Yucatán - Komchén
- Route 72 Av. Tecnológico - Fac. de Ingeniería - Las Américas II
- Route 73 Av. Tecnológico - Siglo XXI - The Harbor - Las Américas II
- Route 74 Av. Tecnológico - Vía Montejo - Las Américas
- Route 75 C-60 Norte - Xcumpich - Dzitya
- Route 76 Chuburná - Fracc. Bugambilias - Francisco de Montejo
- Route 77 Chuburná C-20 - Francisco de Montejo - Glorieta Las Palmas
- Route 78 Chuburná - CICY - Fac. de Matemáticas - CRIT
- Route 79 Chuburná - Glorieta Los Cantaritos - C-61 Francisco de Montejo
- Route 82 Chuburná C-21 - Fac. de Ingeniería

==== West Zone ====
- Route 85 ISSSTE Pensiones - IMSS La Ceiba - Residencial Pensiones
- Route 87 Santiago - Clínica Esperanza - Petronila
- Route 88 Bojorquez - Porvenir
- Route 91 Av. Jacinto Canek - Las Palmeras Cd. Caucel - Paseos de Caucel 2.ª Etapa
- Route 92 Av. Jacinto Canek - Los Almendros - UPY
- Route 94 Av. Jacinto Canek - Deportivo Cd. Caucel - Gran Herradura
- Route 95 O'Horan - IMSS Cd. Caucel - Los Almendros III
- Route 96 Animaya - Bicentenario
- Route 97 65 Centenario - Bosques del Poniente - Anikabil
- Route 98 Nora Quintana - Juan Pablo II
- Route 101 69 Poniente - Madero - Juan Pablo II
- Route 104 Mulsay - Juan Pablo II - CREE - Psiquiático
- Route 105 69 Poniente - Xoclan
- Route 106 69 Opichén
- Route 107 67 Mulsay - Fiscalía
- Route 109 69 Diamante Express

==== South Zone ====
- Route 108 Av. Aviación - Cd. Industrial - Umán
- Route 113 66 Amapola
- Route 114 Piedra de Agua
- Route 115 Manuel Crescencio Rejón - El Roble
- Route 117 58 Emiliano Zapata Sur - Tecoh
- Route 1 60 Emiliano Zapata II - Paso Texas
- Route 2 Periférico - Roble - San Marcos
- Route 4 60 Periférico - Guadalupana
- Route 5 58 San Roque
- Route 6 60 Penal
- Route 7 50 Penal
- Route 10 Xmatkuil
- Route 11 54 Zazil Ha - Fracc. San José Tzal - Villa Bonita
- Route 12 50 Sur - Villa Magna
- Route 18 42 Sur - Cielo Alto
- Route 20 42 Sur - Cruz Roja - Salvador Alvarado
- Route 22 Quinta Avenida

==== East Zone ====
- Route 23 San Haroldo
- Route 25 Santa Isabel
- Route 26 Gálvez - Villas de Oriente R-1
- Route 28 Kanasín - Naranjos 2
- Route 31 Vergel I
- Route 32 Vergel III
- Route 33 Vergel IV y V
- Route 35 Gálvez - Villas de Oriente R-2
- Route 36 Las Palmas - Gran Vistana

=== Express Routes ===
As part of the activation of the confined lanes on Aviación Avenue and Benito Juárez, the State Agency of Yucatán (Agencia Estatal de Yucatán, ATY) has decided to create a series of express routes of various Va y Ven routes that will run through the confined lanes and connect with lines 4 and 5 of the Ie-tram to Umán and the Airport route.

All of them have a cost of $12 pesos for the general rate and $5 pesos for the social rate, they have a schedule every day from 5:00 a.m. to 10:00 p.m., they make the same route as the normal routes, but they have fewer stops and wider distances, this in order to speed up travel times.

- Route 803 Av. Aviación - Cd. Industrial - Umán Express
- Route 804 Paseos de Itzincab - Piedra de Agua Express
- Route 805 Circuito Poniente, Plazas y Universidades Express
- Route 806 Circuito Colonias - Cd. Industrial - Rojo - Coca Express

=== Police station circuits ===
A series of new routes that connect different police stations in Mérida and Progreso with each other and with routes in the interior of the city

- Route 401 Dzibilchaltún - Chablekal - Sac Nicté - La Isla - Periférico
- Route 402 Dzibilchaltún - Santa María - Tamanché - Paraíso - Flamboyanes - San Ignacio - Komchén - Fac. de Ingeniería
- Route 403 Dzununcán - Xmatkuil - Tesip - Tahdzibichén
- Route 404 Komchén - Kikteil - Dzidzilché - Sierra Papacal - Cosgaya - Parque Científico
- Route 405 Chedraui - Comisaría Caucel - Cheumán - Noc Ac - Sierra Papacal - Parque Científico

=== Red Circuit (Route 703) ===
This new route was incorporated on November 4, connecting the east with the south-west of Mérida.

This route can be considered a transversal circuit since it does not reach the center, starting from the Transportation Directorate and arriving at the Pacabtún Sports Unit. It has connection and transfers with Night Routes, Western Circuit, squares and universities, Peripheral Circuit, Downtown - Umán and with the Metropolitan Circuit.

It has 115 stops.

Their fee is $12 pesos for the general rate and $5 pesos for the student rate.

Some stops include

- Dirección de Transporte
- Aeropuerto Internacional de Mérida
- Sam's Club Aviación
- Base Aerea Militar
- UTM Santa Rosa
- Parque Colonia María Luisa
- Unidad Deportiva Kukulcan
- Plaza Oriente
- Unidad Deportiva Pacabtún

=== Metropolitan Circuit ===
This is the improvement of the Metropolitan Circuit that had been previously implemented since November 25, 2005 at the hands of the agency of the same name, later of SITUR and currently of the Va y Ven system. It has a service that goes from 5:00 a.m. to 8:00 p.m. from Monday to Sunday, with the Meliton Salazar park being its last stop and base. It has two ways of traveling, clockwise and counterclockwise, both with the same final base.

It has 261 stops throughout the metropolitan area of Mérida, covering 231 neighborhoods and subdivisions, and with a maximum distance of 500 meters between each one (250 walkable meters), this so that transportation is faster and less delayed, with a waiting time of 15 minutes between each unit.

The rate for this circuit is $12 pesos for the general rate and for the first time it has a social rate, which consists of $5 pesos.

Some stops include:

- CONALEP Mérida II
- UTM Santa Rosa
- IMSS 42 Sur
- Unidad Deportiva Kukulcán
- Universidad Pedagógica
- Cruz Roja Oriente
- Centro Escolar CTM
- IMSS Pacabtun
- PROCOM
- Macro Plaza
- Monumento a las Haciendas
- Glorieta el Pocito
- Ateneo de Mérida
- Gran Plaza
- Técnologico de Mérida
- Glorieta de la Mestiza
- UNIV. UNID Fco. de Montejo
- ISSSTE Lindavista
- Plaza Dorada
- Plaza Las Americas
- Central de Abastos
- Av. Madero 128

=== Western, Squares, and Universities Circuit (Route 702) ===
The Western Squares and Universities Circuit (Circuito Poniente, Plazas y Universidades) has recently been incorporated into the Va y Ven system, thus ending the SITUR-era division that existed between "Western and Squares Circuit" and "Western Circuit, Squares and Universities" previously of, which will now become a single route (Western Circuit, Squares and Universities) that starts from the Directorate of Transportation and reaches the University Campus of the UADY covering 160 neighborhoods along its route and connecting 90 routes public transport.

It has 30 buses and a waiting time of 6 minutes between each one, working from Monday to Sunday from 5:00 a.m. to 10:00 p.m. It also has select stops and transfers with Night Routes, Metropolitan Circuit and Peripheral Circuit.

It costs $12 pesos for the general rate and $5 pesos for the social rate

Selected stations include:

- Dirección de Transporte
- Parque Centenario del Ejercito Mexicano
- Sam's Club Aviación
- Clinica Madero
- Parque Colonia Fracncisco I. Madero
- Plaza Dorada
- ISSSTE Hospital Regional
- Centro Medico Pensiones
- Parque de las Américas
- Hotel Fiesta Americana
- Parque Felipe Carrillo Puerto
- Parque Margarita Maza
- Plaza Malak
- Campus Universitario UADY

=== Interior of the state ===
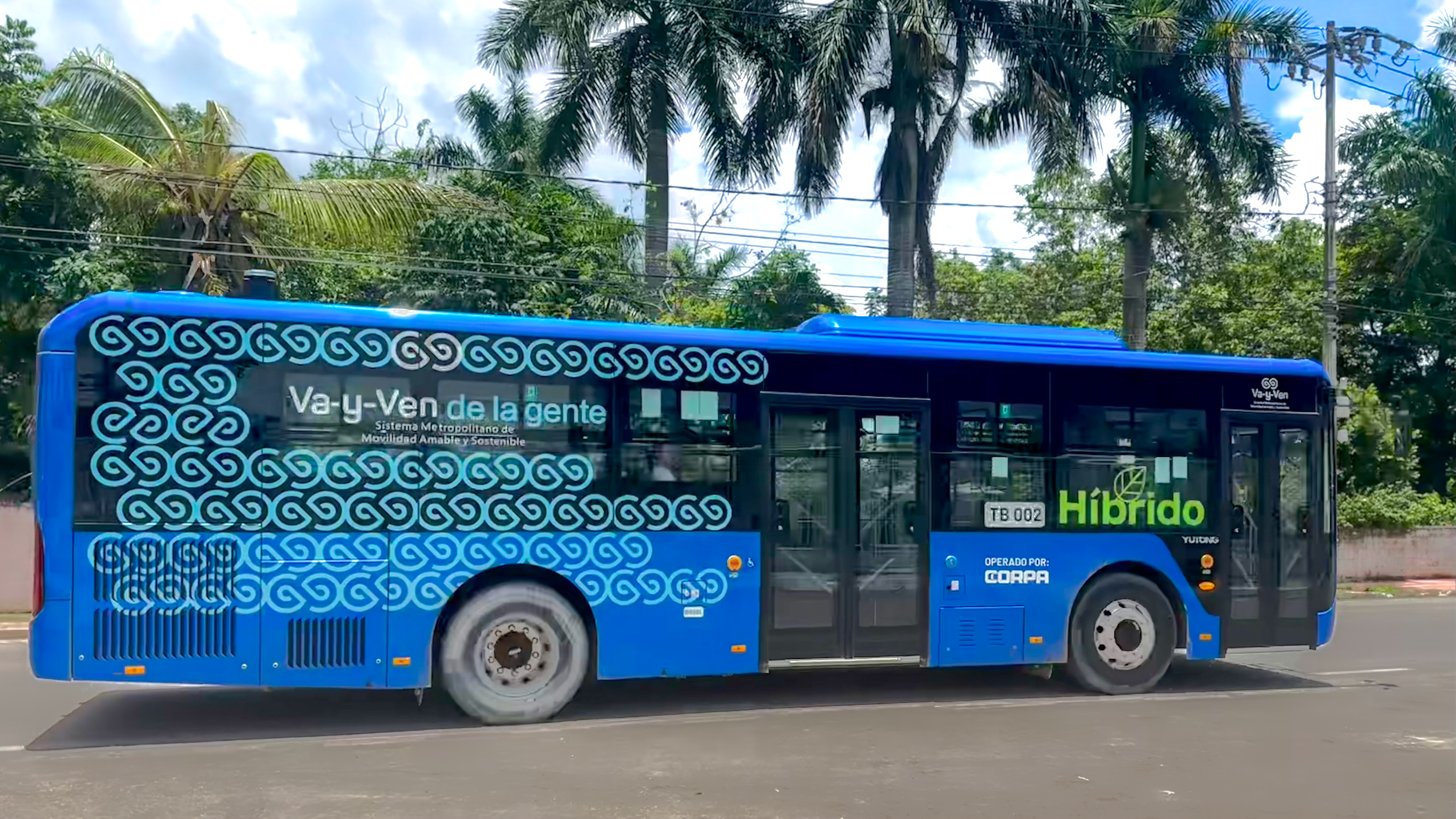
Va y Ven bus in Tizimín.

On 11 May 2024, the first Va y Ven routes outside the metropolitan area of Mérida were implemented. It began operations in the cities of Valladolid, Tizimín and Tekax.

==== Valladolid ====
- Route 1001 Circuito Poniente
- Route 1002 Circuito Oriente
- Route 1003 Transversal

==== Tizimín ====
- Route 1051 Santo Domingo Sur
- Route 1052 COBAY - Polifuncional
- Route 1053 CONALEP - Maquiladoras
- Route 1054 CONALEP - Maquiladoras - Telesecundaria

== See also ==
- Ie-Tram Yucatán
