= 1995 Yucatán gubernatorial election =

← 1993	28 May 1995	2001 →
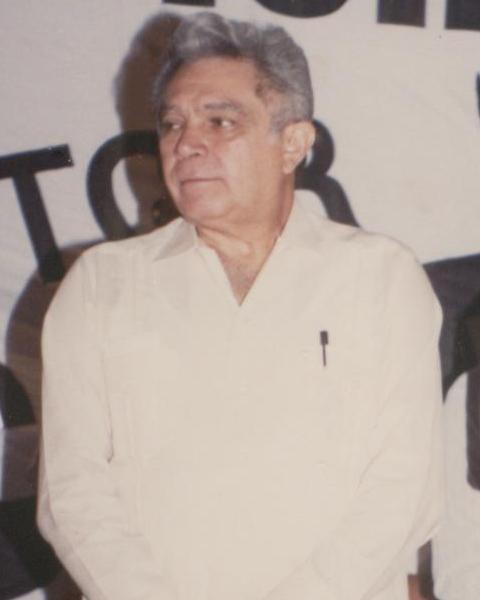

Nominee	Victor Cervera Pacheco	Luis Correa Mena	Eduardo Sobrino Sierra
Party	PRI	PAN	PRD
Popular vote	251,497	229,034	16,799
Percentage	48.78%	44.42%	3.26%
Governor before election
Federico Granja Ricalde
PRI
Elected Governor
Victor Cervera Pacheco
PRI

The 1995 Yucatán gubernatorial election was held on 28 May 1995 to elect the governor of the Mexican state of Yucatán. The competitive election was narrowly won by Victor Cervera Pacheco of the PRI over PAN candidate Luis Correa Mena.

== Background ==
The election was held during the Institutional Revolutionary Party's (PRI) nearly-unchallenged rule of the country. The Los Angeles Times reported that many observers anticipated that the 1995 gubernatorial elections in Yucatán and Guanajuato could "mark the beginning of the end of the PRI's 66 years of rule".

== Campaign and election ==
Ahead of the election, The Washington Post characterized Cervera and Correa as "running neck-and-neck amid charges by independent observers that the ruling party had attempted to tamper with the vote."

Polling conducted ahead of the election found either an effective tie between Cervera and Correa, or a slight advantage for the former. Ahead of the election, observers anticipated the possibility of political violence in the aftermath of voting.

=== Candidates ===
PRI candidate Victor Cervera Pacheco, who had previously served as governor of Yucatán from 1984 to 1988, was described as a member of the PRI's "Old Guard". PAN candidate Luis Correa Mena was described as a protégé of national party president Carlos Castillo Peraza.

== Results ==
The Los Angeles Times reported that while PAN candidate Correa won a strong victory in the relatively-affluent capital city of Mérida, PRI candidate Cervera was able to win by performing strongly in impoverished rural areas. In the aftermath of the election, PAN alleged that Cervera Pacheco was elected via fraud and announced it would hold demonstrations against his election.

1995 Yucatán gubernatorial election
Party	Candidate	Votes	%
PRI	Víctor Cervera Pacheco	251,497	48.78%
PAN	Luis Correa Mena	229,034	44.42%
PRD	Eduardo Sobrino Sierra	16,799	3.26%
