= Ricardo Dájer Nahum =

Mexican politician

Ricardo Dájer Nahum (born February 19, 1955, in Mérida, Yucatán) is a Mexican politician affiliated with the Institutional Revolutionary Party. He is married to Gabriela Lixa Dáguer. He is the current president of the Lebanese Mexican Enterprise Chamber.

He holds a bachelor's degree in accountancy from the Autonomous University of Yucatán. He has also served as president of the Fundación Nueva Visión ("New Vision Foundation", ), the Chamber of Commerce of Mérida () and the Fundación Yucatón, A.C. He has served as State Development Secretary, State Secretary of Trade and Industrial Development of Yucatán (), and board member of the Confederation of Chambers of Commerce of Mexico and president of the Lebanese Club of Mérida, and active member of the Lebanese Sport Center of Yucatán, the Lebanese Chamber of Yucatán and the Lebanese Cultural Center ().

In 1995 ran for and lost the election for the municipal president of Mérida to Patricio Patrón Laviada, who went on to become governor of the state.

== Sources ==
- Interview
