= Rolando Zapata Bello =

Mexican politician and lawyer

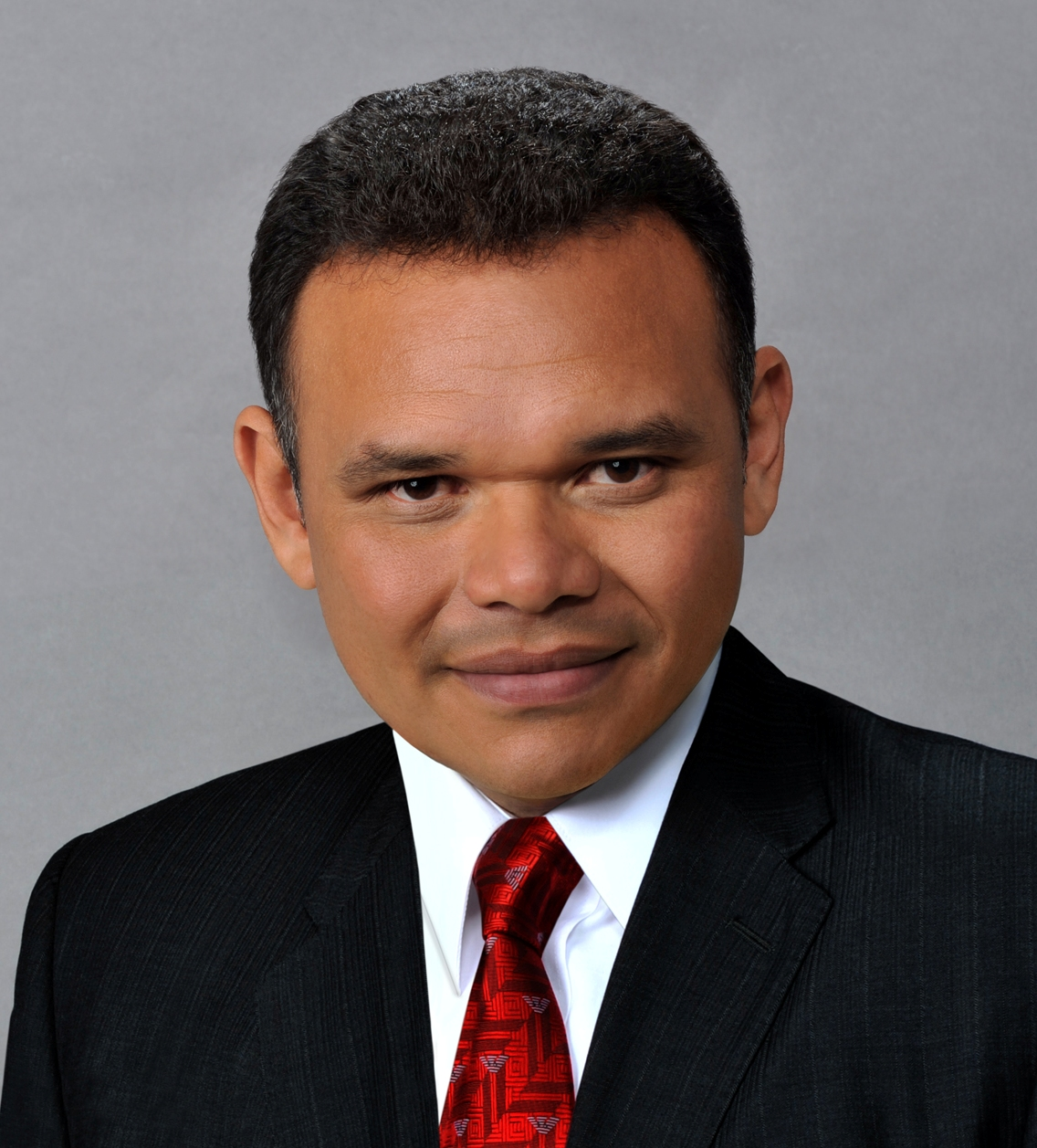

Governor of Yucatán
- In office 1 October 2012 – 1 October 2018
- Preceded by: Ivonne Ortega Pacheco
- Succeeded by: Mauricio Vila Dosal

Personal details
- Born: 11 August 1968 (age 58) Mérida, Yucatán, Mexico
- Party: PRI
- Education: Autonomous University of Yucatán
- Profession: Lawyer

Rolando Rodrigo Zapata Bello (born 11 August 1968) is a Mexican politician and lawyer affiliated with the Institutional Revolutionary Party (PRI) who served as governor of Yucatán from 2012 to 2018.

He previously served as a federal deputy in the 61st Congress (2009 to 2011) representing Yucatán's fourth district. He resigned his seat on 14 December 2011 to contend for the governorship and was replaced for the remainder of his term by Daniel Jesús Granja Peniche.

Zapata Bello won election as one of Yucatán's senators in the 2024 Senate election, occupying the first place on the Fuerza y Corazón por México coalition's two-name formula. The coalition placed second in the election and Zapata Bello was duly elected as the state's third senator.

Preceded by Ivonne Ortega Pacheco	Governor of Yucatán; 2012–2018	Succeeded by Mauricio Vila Dosal
