= Umán railway station =

Railway station in Yucatán, Mexico

Umán
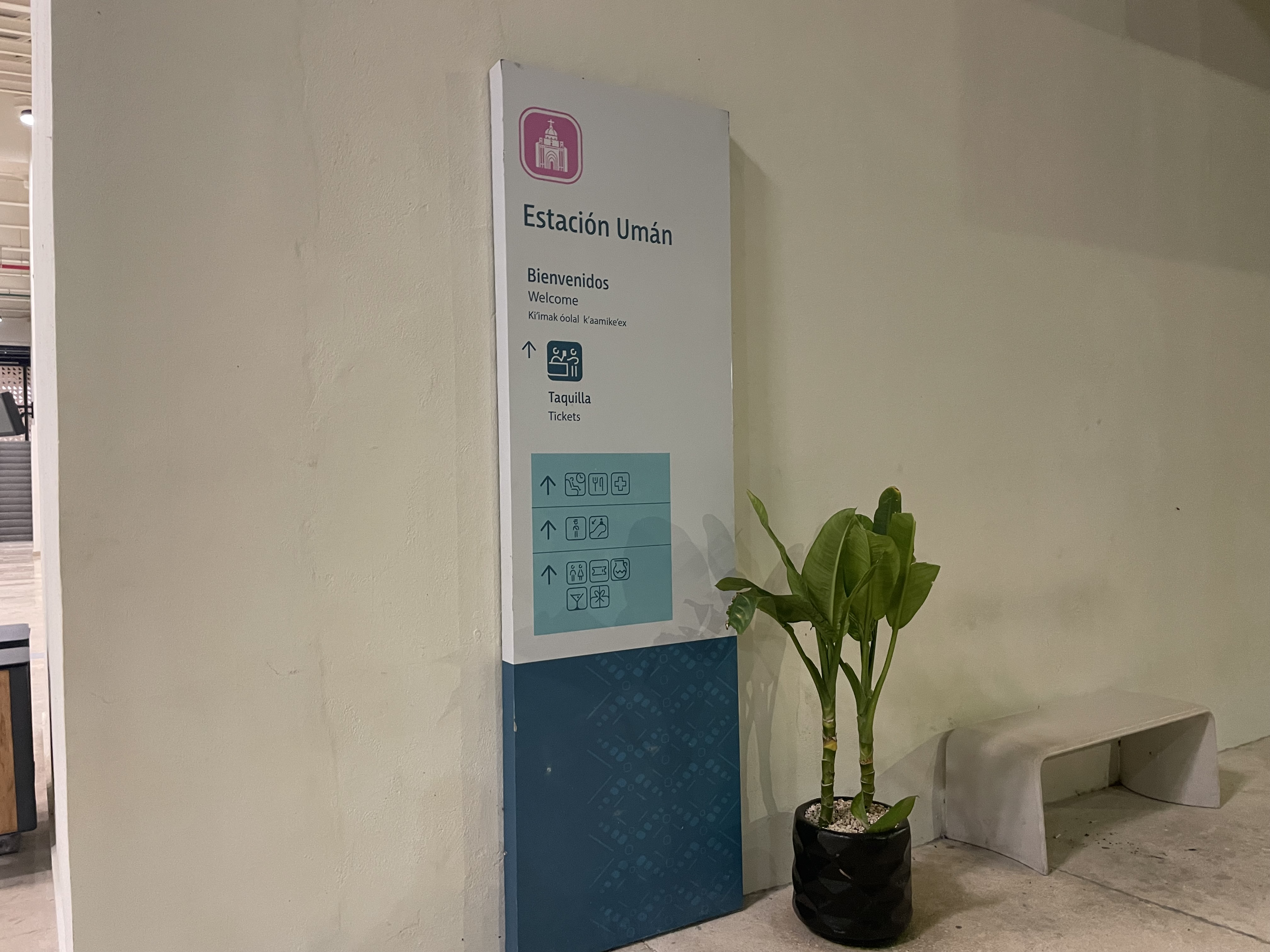

General information
- Location: Umán, Yucatán, Mexico
- Coordinates: 20.84891°N 89.75603°W
- Platforms: 2
- Tracks: 3
- Connections: Ie-Tram Yucatán:

Services
Preceding station	Tren Maya	Following station
Maxcanú toward Palenque	Tren Maya	Teya Mérida toward Cancún Airport
Location

Umán station is a train station in Umán Municipality, Yucatán.

== Tren Maya ==
Andrés Manuel López Obrador announced the Tren Maya project in his 2018 presidential campaign. On 13 August 2018, he announced the complete outline. The route of the new Tren Maya put Umán station on the route that would connect with San Francisco de Campeche railway station and Teya Mérida railway station.
