= 2007 Mexican elections =

A number of elections took place on the local in Mexico during 2007.

== Local elections ==
Date	State	Voters elected	Main article	Winner(s)
May 20, 2007	Yucatán	Governor, State congress, 106 municipal presidents (mayors)	2007 Yucatán state election	PRI-led coalition (Governorship, 59 of 106 mayorships), PRI/PAN (4 of 10 deputies each)
July 1, 2007	Chihuahua	State congress, 67 municipal presidents (mayors)	2007 Chihuahua state election	PRI-led coalition (47 of 67 mayorships, 15 of 22 deputies)
July 1, 2007	Durango	State congress, 39 municipal presidents (mayors)	2007 Durango state election	PRI (19 of 39 mayorships, 12 of 17 deputies)
July 1, 2007	Zacatecas	State congress, 58 municipal presidents (mayors)	2007 Zacatecas state election	PRI (26 of 57 mayorships), PRD (9 of 18 deputies)
August 5, 2007	Aguascalientes	State congress, 11 municipal presidents (mayors)	2007 Aguascalientes state election	PRI (5 of 9 mayorships, 11 of 18 deputies)
August 5, 2007	Oaxaca	State congress	2007 Oaxaca state election	PRI (25 of 25 deputies)
August 5, 2007	Baja California	Governor, State congress, 5 municipal presidents (mayors)	2007 Baja California state election	PAN-led coalition (4 of 5 mayorships, 14 of 16 deputies)
September 2, 2007	Veracruz	State congress, 210 municipal presidents (mayors)	2007 Veracruz state election	PRI (144 of 212 mayorships, 30 of 50 deputies)
October 7, 2007	Chiapas	State congress, 118 municipal presidents (mayors)	2007 Chiapas state election	PRI (41 of 118 mayorships, 9 of 24 deputies )
October 7, 2007	Oaxaca	152 municipal presidents (vote) 418 municipal presidents (consensus) (mayors)	2007 Oaxaca state election	PRI (90 of 151 mayorships, 25 of 25 deputies)
October 14, 2007	Sinaloa	State congress, 18 municipal presidents (mayors)	2007 Sinaloa state election	PRI (16 of 18 mayorships, 18 of 24 deputies )
November 11, 2007	Michoacán	Governor, State congress, 113 municipal presidents (mayors)	2007 Michoacán state election	PRD (governorship, 10 of 24 electoral district deputies), PRI (50 mayorships, including the state capital)
November 11, 2007	Puebla	State congress, 217 municipal presidents (mayors)	2007 Puebla state election	PRI (215 municipal presidents , 24/25 of 26 electoral district deputies)
November 11, 2007	Tamaulipas	State congress, 43 municipal presidents (mayors)	2007 Tamaulipas state election	PRI (34 of 43 municipal presidents, 17 of 19 electoral district deputies)
November 11, 2007	Tlaxcala	State congress, 60 municipal presidents (mayors)	2007 Tlaxcala state election	PAN (15 of 19 electoral district deputies)
