= Mauricio Vila Dosal =

Mexican politician

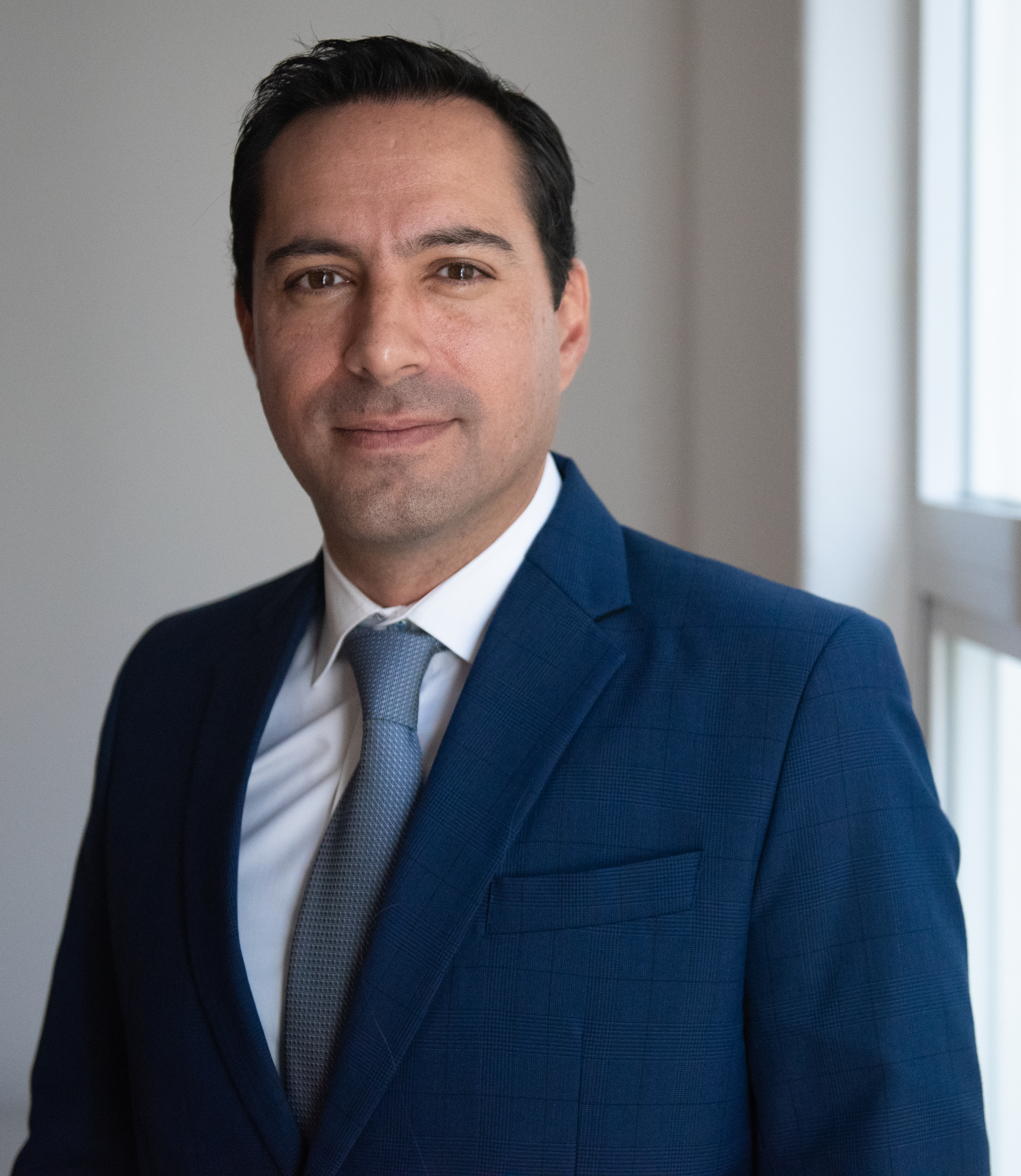
- Mauricio Vila in 2022

Governor of Yucatán
- In office October 1, 2018 – August 31, 2024
- Preceded by: Rolando Zapata Bello
- Succeeded by: Joaquín Jesús Díaz Mena

Mayor of Merida
- In office September 1, 2015 – January 7, 2018
- Preceded by: Renán Barrera Concha
- Succeeded by: María Dolores Fritz Sierra

Local deputy of the Congress of Yucatán for the 4th local district
- In office November 1, 2012 – January 6, 2015
- Preceded by: Renán Barrera Concha
- Succeeded by: José Giovani Canto Gómez

Personal details
- Born: March 30, 1980 (age 46) Mérida, Yucatán, Mexico
- Party: National Action Party
- Education: Marista University of Mérida (LLB); University of Phoenix, Arizona (MBA); George Washington University
- Occupation: Lawyer and politician

Mauricio Vila Dosal (born March 30, 1980, in Merida, México) is a Mexican politician who served as Governor of Yucatán from 2018 to 2024. Prior to this, he was the Mayor of Mérida.

== Biography ==
He is a law graduate of the Universidad Marista de Mérida, and holds a Master of Business Administration from the University of Phoenix, Arizona, and began a master's degree in Political Management and Strategic Governance from George Washington University in 2013.

As member of the Mexican party Partido Acción Nacional (PAN), he ran for Mayor of Mérida in the 2015 elections, where he defeated his closest competitor, Nerio Torres Arcila (PRI), by 10,335 votes, with a total of 170,449 votes.

He began his entrepreneurial career in 2005 in the restaurant sector working as development agent for Subway in the states of Campeche, Tabasco and Chiapas, and served from 2003 to 2015 as General Manager of the same franchise in Yucatán.

He is married to María Eugenia Ortíz Abraham with whom he has 3 children, Alejandrina, Mauricio and Santiago Vila Ortiz.

== Political career ==
As a politician he has served as State Counselor of Partido Acción Nacional (PAN) in Yucatán, candidate for President of the State Steering Committee of the same political party in 2011, and Linking Secretary in 2008 to 2011.

He was local deputy for the fourth local district headquartered in the city of Mérida, with a voting record of 32,044 in favor of his party in the 2012 election, defeating his closest competitor from PRI (Partido Revolucionario Institucional) by 10,840 votes.

He served as president of the Committee on the Environment of the State Congress in the LX legislature where he promoted several initiatives, the most important of which were the criminalization of animal abuse with economic sanctions and jail, the Integrated Solid Waste Management, Development and Use of Bicycle.

He was the mayor of Mérida between September 1, 2015 and January 7, 2018, when he resigned in order to seek his party's candidacy for governor of Yucatán.

=== Mayor of Merida ===
In September 2015 he was elected Mayor of Mérida. During his swearing in, he announced that he would be reorganizing the municipal administration, with a focus on cutting edge approach, innovation and modernity, responding to the new challenges of a growing city to strengthen regional, national, and international identity and positioning Mérida as a sustainable municipality, with universal accessibility, urban mobility and quality public services.

In September 2015 he voluntarily reduced his salary by 20%, and ordered that the Chevrolet Suburban assigned to him be reassigned for official police use. He also announced that he will cover his own medical and cellphone expenses.

At the same time, he initiated an internal program of budget savings that would affect neither the efficiency nor quality of the services destined for citizens. These include a 20 per cent reduction in the salaries of the trust employees in all areas of the municipal government.

For the first time in the history of its municipal government, Mérida has a Department of Sustainable Development and a Department of Animal Protection.

In October 2015 he visited the Federal Republic of Germany to learn about government programs in the areas of energetics, mobility, urban sustainable development and investigation.

Mauricio Vila has been a major supporter of the "Law 3 of 3" to foster transparency and combat corruption, signing the initiative into law to promote it to the National Union Congress.

=== 2018 state elections ===
In January 2018, he announced his resignation as Mayor of Mérida in response to his election as precandidate of the National Action Party to run the Governor's office 2018 elections. In February of the same year, he was ratified as his party's candidate. On July 1, 2018, Mauricio Vila was elected as the next Governor of Yucatán.

=== Governor of Yucatan ===
Mauricio Vila took office as Governor of the State of Yucatan on October 1, 2018.

As governor, he increased annual security spending from $875 million to $2.1 billion.

Vila stepped down as governor on May 7, 2024, and resumed his duties on June 4, 2024.

== Recognition ==
During his management as mayor, the City of Mérida has received the following acknowledgments and awards:

- The Department of Urban Development of Mérida's City Council qualified as the only government institution to obtain the "Yucatan's Quality Award" given by the State of Yucatán.
- For the third time, Forbes Magazine named Mérida as one of the three best cities in Mexico to live and invest.
- Mérida's administration was ranked first among 54 others for its online services according to a study realized by the Mexican Institute of Competitiveness (IMCO).
- Acknowledgement as a Safe City endorsed by the ONU and OMS according to the model of Karolinska Institute of Stockholm, Sweden.
- Named American Capital of Culture for the second time by the International Bureau of Cultural Capitals, endorsed by the OEA.
- Mérida became the first city in Mexico to sign the Cultural Rights Letter to preserve, improve and spread the cultural patrimony of the city.
- Mérida received the Best Practices Award 2015 Local Governments in the category of E-government, from the magazine Mayors of Mexico, specializing in municipal issues.
