= Daniel Jesús Granja Peniche =

Mexican politician

- Born: 7 August 1986 (age 39); Mérida, Yucatán, Mexico
- Occupation: Politician
- Political party: PRI

Daniel Jesús Granja Peniche (born 7 August 1986) is a Mexican politician from the Institutional Revolutionary Party (PRI). In 2012 he sat in the Chamber of Deputies for the fourth district of Yucatán as the substitute of Rolando Zapata Bello.
