= Federico Granja Ricalde =

Mexican politician (1942–2021)

Member of the Chamber of Deputies of Mexico
- In office 1 September 2000 – 31 August 2003
- In office 1 September 1985 – 31 August 1988
- Preceded by: Daniel Belanzario Díaz
- Succeeded by: Guillermo Jiménez Morales
- Constituency: 24th district of the Federal District
- In office 1 September 1979 – 31 August 1982
- Preceded by: Myrna Esther Hoyos Schlamme
- Succeeded by: Víctor Cervera Pacheco
- Constituency: 1st district of Yucatán

Governor of Yucatán
- In office 1 February 1994 – 31 July 1995
- Preceded by: Ricardo Ávila Heredia
- Succeeded by: Víctor Cervera Pacheco

Municipal President of Mérida
- In office 1 January 1976 – 31 December 1978
- Preceded by: Efraín Cevallos Gutiérrez
- Succeeded by: Gaspar Gómez Chacón

Personal details
- Born: 17 August 1942 Mérida, Yucatán, Mexico
- Died: 2 November 2021 (aged 79) Mérida, Yucatán, Mexico
- Party: PRI

Federico Granja Ricalde (17 August 1942 – 2 November 2021) was a Mexican politician. A member of the Institutional Revolutionary Party (PRI), he served in the Chamber of Deputies in 1979–1982 (Yucatán's 1st), 1985–1988 (DF's 24th), and 2000–2003 (plurinominal). He was also governor of Yucatán from 1994 to 1995 and municipal president of Mérida from 1976 to 1978.
