= Patricio Patrón Laviada =

Mexican politician

Patricio Patrón
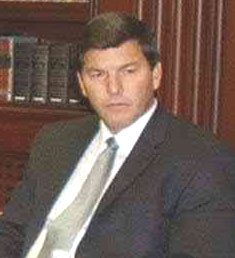
- Patricio Patrón

Governor of Yucatán
- In office August 1, 2001 – July 31, 2007
- Preceded by: Víctor Cervera
- Succeeded by: Ivonne Ortega

Municipal president of Mérida
- In office 1995–1998
- Preceded by: Luis Correa Mena
- Succeeded by: Xavier Abreu

Personal details
- Born: December 17, 1957 (age 68) Mérida, Yucatán (Mexico)
- Party: PAN
- Spouse: Silvia Cícero Cáceres

Patricio José Patrón Laviada (born December 17, 1957, in Mérida, Yucatán) is a Mexican politician who served as Governor of Yucatán from 2001 to 2007. He is currently serving as Attorney General of Environmental Protection (Procuraduria Federal de Proteccion al Ambiente), a position to which he was appointed by Felipe Calderón, President of Mexico, in January 2008.

Patricio Patrón is the first governor of the state of Yucatán who emanated from the National Action Party (PAN), through a coalition with the Party of the Democratic Revolution (PRD), the Labor Party (PT) and the Ecologist Green Party of Mexico (PVEM), despite the contempt and the campaign organized against him by his predecessor Víctor Cervera, defeated his opponent of the Institutional Revolutionary Party (PRI), Orlando Paredes Lara in the election that took place in 2001 by a wide margin, largely thanks to the program "Adopt a City" that was implemented by pianist Ermilo Castilla Roche.

Patrón took office as governor in 2001; his term of office expired in 2007. Patrón became Municipal president of Mérida for the 1995 – 1998 term beating Ricardo Dájer of the PRI. Patrón then served as a senator representing his state before being elected governor. He is a member of the National Action Party and currently serves as Attorney General for Environmental Protection.

Preceded by Víctor Cervera	Governor of Yucatán; 2001–2007	Succeeded by Ivonne Ortega
Preceded by Luis Correa Mena	Municipal president of Mérida; 1995–1998	Succeeded by Xavier Abreu
