= Ana Rosa Payán =

Mexican politician

Ana Rosa Payán Cervera
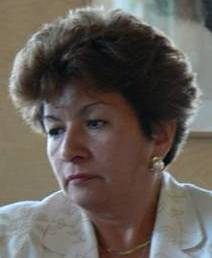

24th Mayor of Mérida, Yucatán
- In office July 1, 1991 – July 7, 1993
- Preceded by: Carlos Ceballos Traconis
- Succeeded by: Luis Correa Mena

Personal details
- Born: 1951 (age 74–75)
- Party: Independent
- Education: Autonomous University of Yucatán
- Occupation: Politician
- Profession: Accountant

Ana Rosa Payán Cervera is a Mexican right-wing politician from the state of Yucatán who in 2006 served as Director of the National System for Integral Family Development (DIF) in the cabinet of Vicente Fox. In 2007 she ran for Governor of Yucatán as the Labor Party–Convergence candidate.

== Personal life ==
Payán was born to Alfonso Payán Flores and Aurora Cervera de Payán. She holds a bachelor's degree in accounting.

== Political career ==
Payán joined the National Action Party in 1983 and from that year until early 2007 she was an active PAN member. She served as a federal deputy from 1988 to 1990, representing Yucatán's first district; Mayor of Mérida from 1991 to 1993 (the first female in that function); local deputy in the Congress of Yucatán from 1995 to 1997; and Senator from 1997 to 2000. In January 2006 President Vicente Fox designated her Director of the National System for Integral Family Development (DIF).

=== Yucatán gubernatorial election ===
In December 2006 Payán contested for the PAN nomination for Governor of Yucatán but was defeated in the PAN primaries by Xavier Abreu Sierra; following the primary election results Payán left the PAN alleging fraud during the elections; She then accepted the Convergence invitation to run as its candidate for the 2007 Yucatán gubernatorial election. Payán lost against the PRI candidate.

Preceded by Ana Teresa Aranda	Director of the DIF; 2006	Succeeded by Cecilia Landerreche Gómez Morín
Preceded by Xavier Abreu Sierra	Municipal president of Mérida; 2001 – 2004	Succeeded by Manuel Fuentes Alcocer
Preceded by —	Municipal president of Mérida; 1990 – 1993	Succeeded by Luis Correa Mena
