= Alliance for Yucatan Party =

Alliance for Yucatan Party Partido Alianza por Yucatán
- Founded: 1999
- Dissolved: 2010
- Headquarters: Mexico City
- Ideology: Regionalism; Autonomism; Social democracy
- Colours: Green

Party flag

The Party Alliance for Yucatán (Spanish: Alianza Partido por Yucatán, PAY) was a political party in the Mexican state of Yucatán. It was formed in the early 21st century with the aim of representing the interests of the people of Yucatán at the local and national levels.

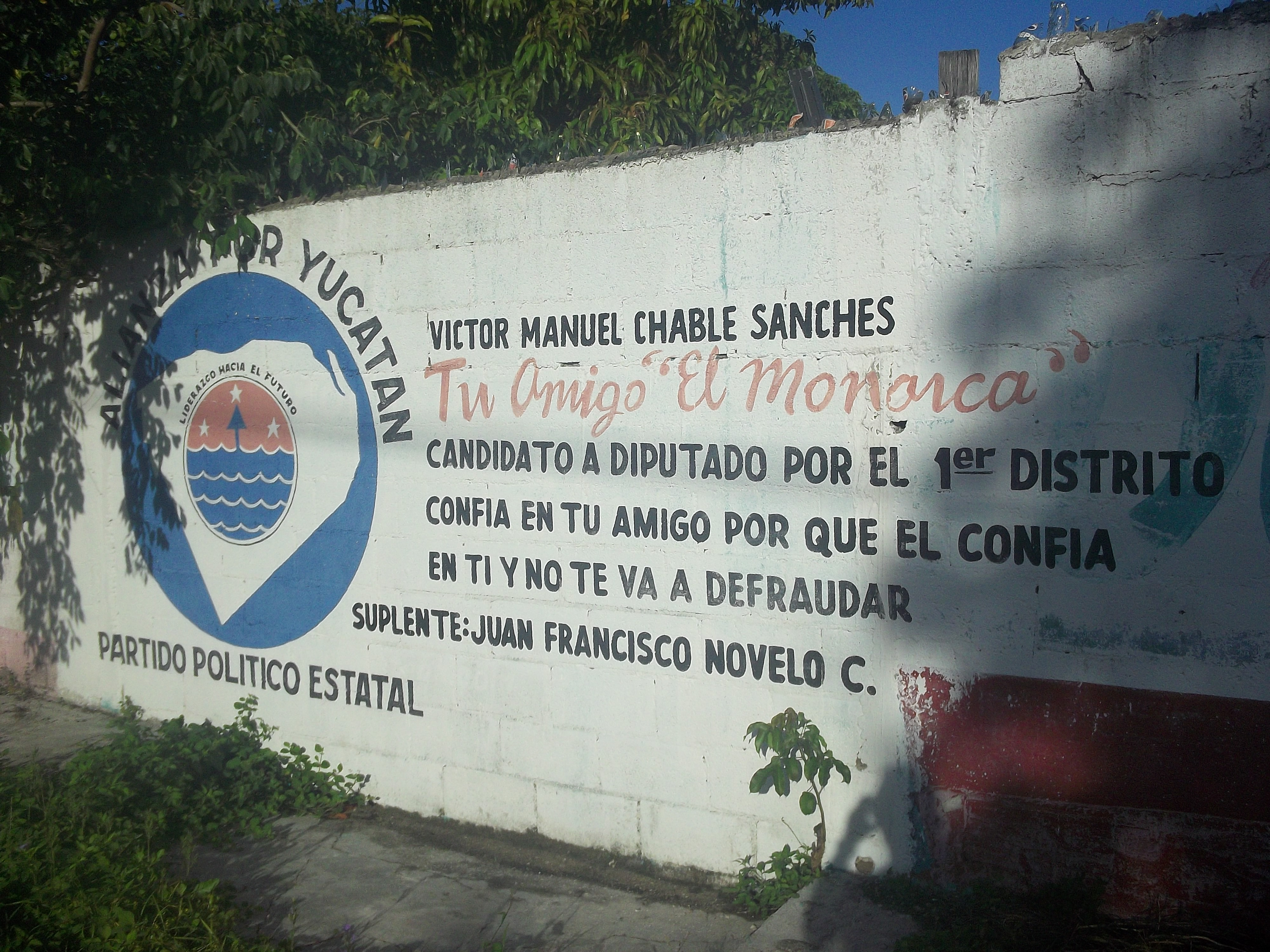
Political propaganda of the candidates of the Alianza por Yucatán Party.

The party was led by Xavier Abreu Sierra, who on multiple occasions sought the self-determination of the Yucatan peninsula including autonomy up until the right of independence. Xavier later ran for the National Action Party's nomination for the position of governor of Yucatán. However, he was defeated by Yvonne Ortega-Pacheco, who ran on a coalition of the Institutional Revolutionary Party (PRI), Greens, and the local Alliance for Yucatán. Payán, who initially sought the National Action nomination but was defeated by Abreu, left the party and won the nomination of the nominally left-wing parties Convergence and the Workers Party, despite her right-wing ideology.

On May 16, the PAY received just 2,959 votes out of 860,129 cast, accounting for 0.34% of the total votes. Consequently, the General Council of the Institute of Electoral Procedures and Citizen Participation (IPEPAC) annulled the party's registration and liquidated its assets to settle any outstanding debts. The party was barred from seeking re-registration until after a regular state electoral cycle, despite its denial of claims labeling it as separatist.

== Governor ==
Choice	Candidate	Votes 2	Percentage	Result
2001	Francisco Kantun Ek	1471	0.21%	Misses
2007	Yvonne Ortega-Pacheco	1837	0.21%	win
