= Dzemul Municipality =

Municipality in the Mexican state of Yucatán

Dzemul
- Municipality
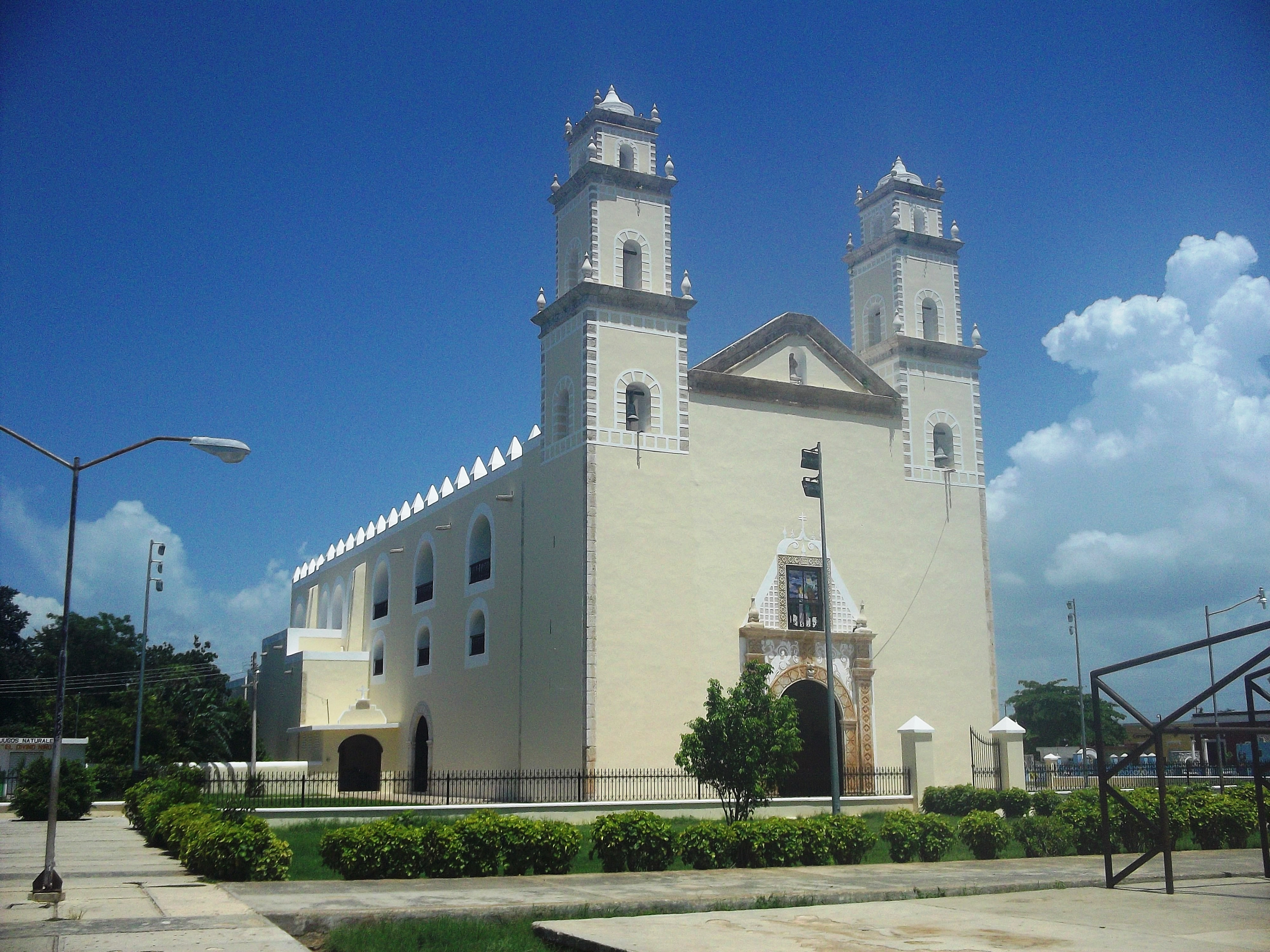
- Principal Church of Dzemul, Yucatán

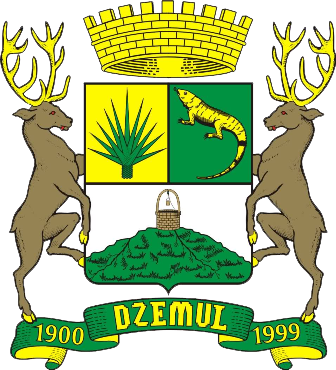
- Coat of arms

- Municipal location in Yucatán

- Location of the Municipality in Mexico
- Coordinates: 21°12′37″N 89°18′32″W
- Country: Mexico
- State: Yucatán

Government
  - Type: 2012–2015
  - Municipal President: Domingo Argimiro Ortega Graniel

Area
  - Total: 123.91 km^{2} (47.84 sq mi)
- Elevation: 10 m (33 ft)

Population (2010)
  - Total: 3,489
- Time zone: UTC-6 (Central Standard Time)
- INEGI Code: 026
- Major Airport: Merida (Manuel Crescencio Rejón) International Airport
- IATA Code: MID
- ICAO Code: MMMD

Dzemul Municipality (In the Yucatec Maya Language: “ravaged mound” is a municipality in the Mexican state of Yucatán containing 123.91 square kilometres (47.84 sq mi) of land and located roughly 47 kilometres (29 mi) northeast of the city of Mérida. There is a large Mayan archaeological site called Xcambo, which is used as a place of worship as there is a chapel built above the Mayan remains.

== History ==
During pre-Hispanic times, the town fell within the provinces under the chieftainship of Ceh Pech. After the conquest the area became part of the encomienda system.

Yucatán declared its independence from the Spanish Crown in 1821 and in 1825, the area was assigned to the Coastal region with its headquarters in Izamal. In 1867, Dzemul was separated from Motul and became its own municipality. During the henequen boom of the nineteenth century, Dzemul was an important center for the production of sisal. Some of its most important haciendas at that time were Constancia, San Antonio, San Diego and San Eduardo.

== Governance ==
The municipal president is elected for a three-year term. The town council has four councilpersons, who serve as Secretary and councilors of markets; parks and gardens; cemeteries.

The Municipal Council administers the business of the municipality. It is responsible for budgeting and expenditures and producing all required reports for all branches of the municipal administration. Annually it determines educational standards for schools.

The Police Commissioners ensure public order and safety. They are tasked with enforcing regulations, distributing materials and administering rulings of general compliance issued by the council.

== Communities ==
The head of the municipality is Dzemul, Yucatán. The other populated areas include Bocola, Constancia, Osorio, St. Mary's, St. Thomas, San Antonio, San Diego and San Eduardo. The significant populations are shown below:

Community	Population
Entire Municipality (2010)	3,489
Dzemul	3062 in 2005
San Diego	84 in 2005
San Eduardo	64 in 2005

== Local festivals ==
Every year from the 14 to 18 December a celebration is held in honor of the Virgin of Expectation.

== Tourist attractions ==
Dzemul meaning "Little Pyramid" has an 18th-century church called the Santa Ana Dzemul, which is very large and is said to be the largest parish church in the Yucatán peninsula. Its long nave has broad transepts and a camari at the back of the apse which is raised. It does not have a dome, a usual feature of that period, but its nave extends length wise with support provided by the walls of the nave which are thick and high; it encloses the two tiered passage. The tall facade has a pediment which is triangular in shape. The belfry is multilayered and is similar to the one at Merida cathedral; the bell towers have cornices at each level finished at the edges with white quoining. Decorative stucco work embellishes the western porch. The entry door has arched carvings of geometric design and is provided with a scrolled keystone and a Franciscan coat of arms. Floral designs with winding tendrils are also provided on the spandrels and the flanks. An image of St. Francis is deified in an open niche on the pediment in a dramatic open sky scenario which denotes that the church belonged to the Franciscan period, as of 1690 itself. The church's interior, which was in a poor state of maintenance, has undergone renovation during early 1800s incorporating neoclassical and baroque architectural features. There is also a renovated image of St. Paul, painted in bright red and green colour, which is of the 18th century. The stone font in the baptistery has a signature inscription of the carver and bears the date 1691. The water from the font flows into a drain below the church.

There are two smaller churches. One is dedicated to the Virgin of Saint Ann and the other to the Virgin of Santa Rosa del Lima. There are two haciendas named Hacienda San Diego Guerra and Hacienda San Eduardo. A surprising place of worship is the important archaeological site at Xcambo. Xcambo means “Place of the Maiden” or “Place of the Waning Moon” but it still used as a place of worship as there is a small chapel. The chapel is built above one of the substantial structures built by the Mayans in a clearing in the mangroves created by a limestone outcrop. It is dedicated to "Our Lady of the Assumption and the Immaculate Conception". Xcambo itself is one of the largest pre-Hispanic structures on the peninsula and it is thought to have been used to control the trade in salt.

== Bibliography ==
- Perry, Richard D.; Perry, Rosalind (2002). Maya Missions: Exploring Colonial Yucatan. Espada├▒a Press. ISBN 978-0-9620811-9-4.
