= Orlando Paredes Lara =

Mexican politician

- Born: 3 August 1940 (age 85); Mérida, Yucatán, Mexico
- Occupations: Lawyer and politician
- Political party: PRI

Orlando Alberto Paredes Lara (born 3 August 1940) is a Mexican lawyer and politician affiliated with the Institutional Revolutionary Party (PRI). He served in the Senate from 2000 to 2006 (58th and 59th Congresses) representing Yucatán and in the Chamber of Deputies for Yucatán's 1st district from 1997 to 2000.
