= Xavier Abreu Sierra =

Mexican politician (born 1950)

Xavier Antonio Abreu Sierra (born February 11, 1950, in Mérida, Yucatán) is a Mexican politician affiliated with the National Action Party (PAN).

== Political career ==
Abreu has been an active PAN member since 1981. From 1985 to 1988 he was member of the Chamber of Deputies. From 1998 to 2001 he served as municipal president of Mérida. Abreu served in the cabinet of Governor Patricio Patrón Laviada as Secretary of Social Development.

In December 2006, Abreu contested for the PAN nomination for Governor of Yucatán; he won the PAN primaries defeating Ana Rosa Payán and Luis Correa Mena. In February 2007, the New Alliance party showed support for Abreu by nominating him as their "common candidate" to the state government. This means that Xavier Abreu was the candidate for both PAN and Nueva Alianza. Abreu lost the election to the Institutional Revolutionary Party candidate Ivonne Ortega.

Preceded by Patricio Patrón Laviada	Municipal president of Mérida; 1998 — 2001	Succeeded by Ana Rosa Payán
