= Autonomous University of Yucatan =

Coordinates: 20°58′11″N 89°37′23″W

Autonomous University of Yucatán
- Universidad Autónoma de Yucatán
- Former names: Universidad Nacional del Sureste (1922-1938, 1951-1958); Universidad de Yucatán (1938-1951, 1958-1984)
- Motto: Luz, Ciencia y Verdad
- Motto in English: Light, Science and Truth
- Type: Public
- Established: February 22, 1922
- Rector: Carlos Alberto Estrada Pinto
- Academic staff: 925 -710 tenured -215 scholarship
- Students: 17,379
- Undergraduates: 10,538
- Postgraduates: 1,339
- Other students: 5,502 bacculaurate
- Location: Mérida, Yucatán, Mexico
- Colors: Gold & blue
- Website: Official English Version

The Autonomous University of Yucatan, (Spanish: Universidad Autónoma de Yucatán; UADY), is an autonomous public university in the state of Yucatán, Mexico, with its central campuses located in the state capital of Mérida. It is the largest tertiary educational institution (Spanish: educación superior) in the state, offering some 41 different courses at the undergraduate or Bachelor's degree (licenciatura) level, and 26 postgraduate Master's degrees (maestrías). The institution was established in 1922 by then governor Felipe Carrillo Puerto as the Universidad Nacional del Sureste, but its lineage may be traced back to a Spanish Empire royal decree promulgated in 1611, that allowed for the creation of the Colegio de San Francisco Javier in Mérida.

== See also ==
- Education in Mexico
