= Congress of Yucatán =

Legislature of Yucatán, Mexico

Honorable Congress of the State of Yucatan Honorable Congreso del Estado de Yucatán
- 64th Legislature

Type
- Houses: Unicameral
- Term limits: 1 period (3 years)

History
- Founded: August 20, 1823

Leadership
- President of the Congress: Claudia Estefanía Baeza Martínez; Since 1 February 2025,

Structure
- Seats: 35
- Political groups: Morena (17); National Action Party (12); Institutional Revolutionary Party (2); Citizens' Movement (2); Ecologist Green Party of Mexico (1); Labor Party (1)
- Length of term: 3 years
- Authority: Constitution of Yucatán (Title four)
- Salary: $109,880 pesos

Elections
- Voting system: Direct election
- Last election: 2 June 2024
- Next election: 6 June 2027

Meeting place
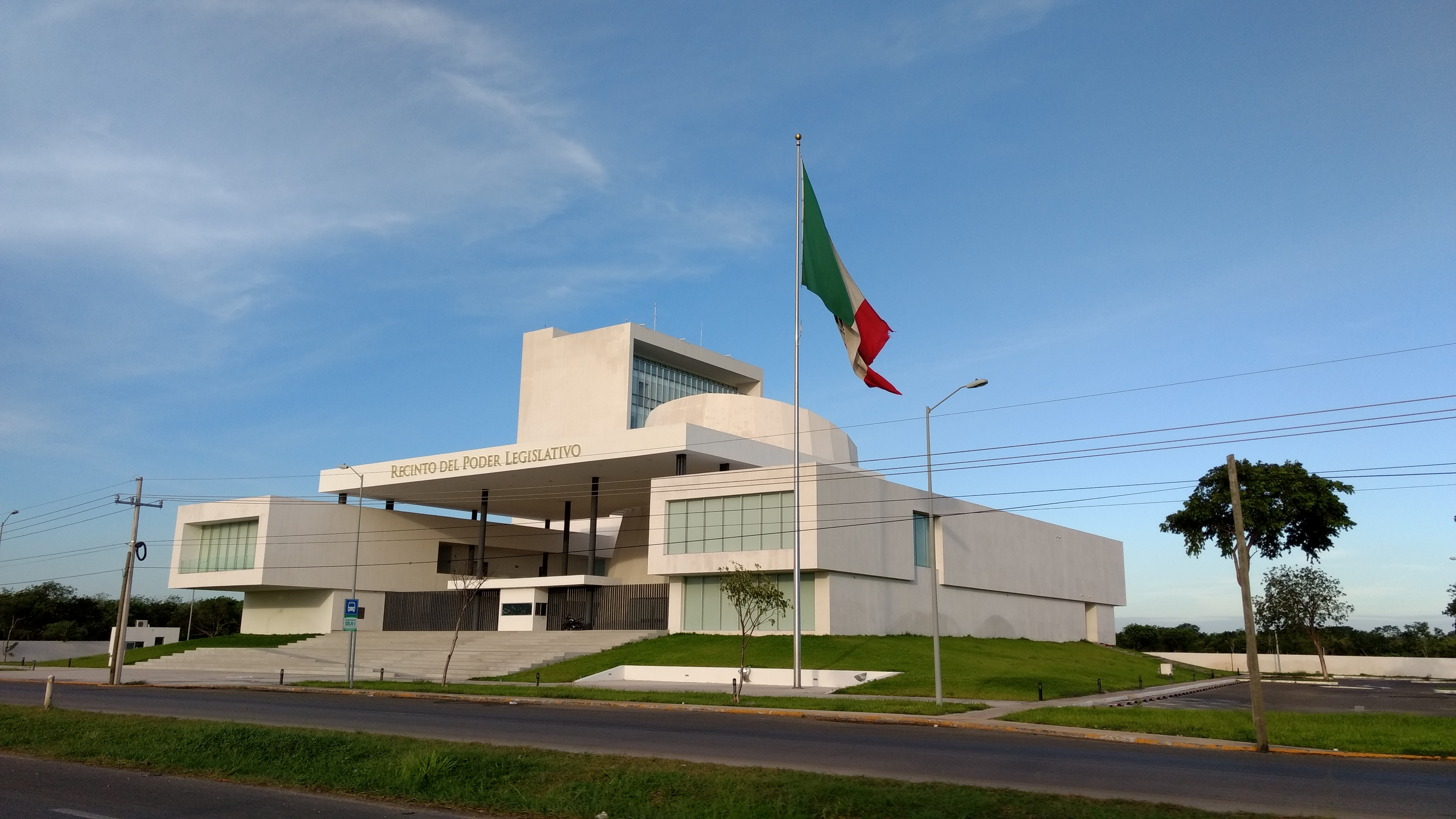
- Hall of the Legislative Power, Mérida, Yucatán

Website
- Official State Congress website

Constitution
- Constitution of Yucatan

The Congress of the State of Yucatán (Spanish: Congreso del Estado de Yucatán; Yucatec Maya: u Noj Mola’ayil u Péetlu’umil Yucatán), or simply the Congress of Yucatán, is the legislative branch of the government of the State of Yucatán. The Congress is the governmental deliberative body of Yucatán, which is equal to, and independent of, the executive and the judiciary. The Congress of Yucatán is an unicameral legislature.

The current session of the Congress consists of 35 deputies (21 elected by the first-past-the-post system and 14 by proportional representation). Deputies are elected to serve for a three-year term with the possibility of re-election for an additional term.

Since its installation the congress has been renewed 64 times; the current legislature was elected in 2024, and it is known as the LXIV Legislature of the Congress of Yucatán.

== Composition ==
The 64th Legislature of the Congress of Yucatán consists of the following political parties:

Political Party	Seats
Morena	17
National Action Party	12
Institutional Revolutionary Party	2
Citizens' Movement	2
Ecologist Green Party of Mexico	1
Labor Party	1

== See also ==
- List of Mexican state congresses
