= State governments of Mexico =

Mexican State Government

State governments of Mexico are those sovereign governments formed in each Mexican state.

State governments in Mexico are structured according to each state's constitution and modeled after the federal system, with three branches of government — executive, legislative, and judicial — and formed based on the congressional system. On the other hand, Mexico's central federal government represents the United Mexican States before international bodies such as the United Nations.

Executive power is exercised by the executive branch, headed by the state's governor and advised by a cabinet of secretaries independent of the legislature. Legislative power is vested in the Congress of the State. Judicial power is bestowed on the various local tribunals (Ministerio de Justicia) and the state's Supreme Court of Justice.

== State governments ==
Mexico is a federation of 31 sovereign states. All constituent states of the federation must have a republican form of government based on a congressional system. Executive power is vested upon a governor elected by first-past-the-post plurality without the possibility of re-election. Legislative power is conferred upon a unicameral Congress whose composition is determined by the constitutions of each state but must include first-past-the-post and proportional representation deputies & they must not be re-elected for the next immediate term. Judicial power is vested in the tribunals that each state establishes in its constitution. The re-election of the ministers of justice is a prerogative established by each constituent state.

All states are independent and autonomous in their internal administration. The federal government cannot intervene in any state's affairs unless there is a complete cessation of government powers and through previous study, recommendation, and/or approval of the Congress of the Union. The states cannot make an alliance with any foreign power or with any other state. They cannot unilaterally declare war against a foreign nation unless their territory is invaded and cannot wait for the Congress of the Union to issue a declaration of war.

== Municipal governments ==
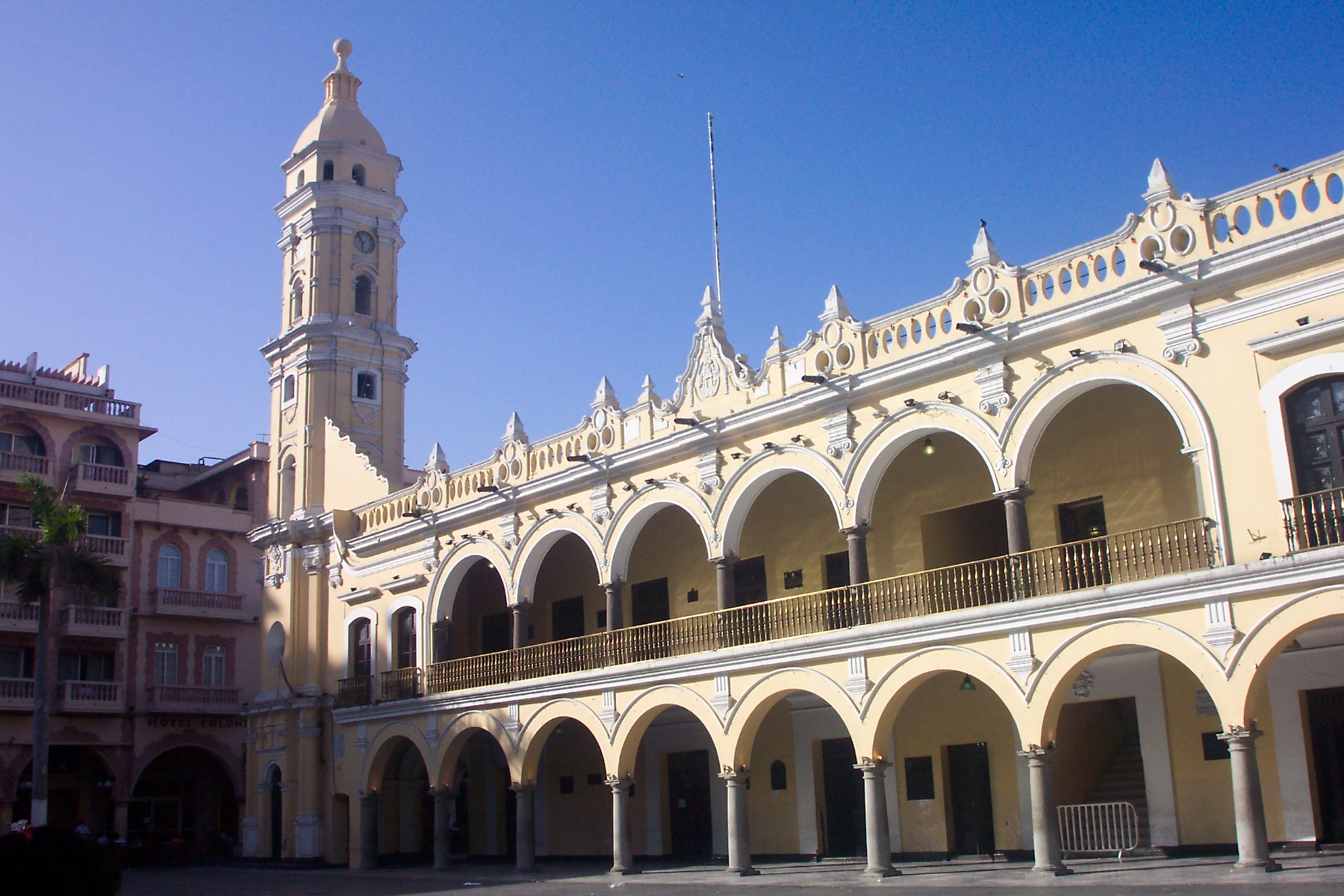
Municipal Palace of Veracruz

All states are divided into municipalities, which is the smallest autonomous political entity in Mexico. Municipalities are governed through a municipal council (ayuntamiento) headed by a mayor or municipal president (presidente municipal) whose work is supported by a predetermined number of regents (regidores) and trustees (síndicos), according to the constitutions of the states they are part of. Since 1917, there have been no intermediate entities or authorities between municipalities and state governments. Members of the municipal councils cannot be reelected for the next immediate term. Autonomous municipalities are constitutionally known as "free municipalities" (municipios libres).

Municipalities are responsible for public services (such as water and sewage), street lighting, public safety, traffic, supervision of slaughterhouses, and cleaning and maintaining public parks, gardens, and cemeteries, as well as in zoning and urban planning. They may also assist the state and federal governments in education, emergency fire and medical services, environmental protection, and maintaining monuments and historical landmarks. As of 1983, they can collect property taxes and user fees, although more funds are obtained from the state and federal governments than from their collection efforts.

== Elections ==
The elections in each state are held at different times, depending on the state, and aren't necessarily held at the same time as the federal elections. Currently, Morena is the largest political force in the Congress of the Union in terms of the number of seats and the number of states governed by it. As of 2026:

- The PRI governs 2 states: Coahuila and Durango
- The PAN governs 4 states: Aguascalientes, Chihuahua, Guanajuato, and Querétaro
- The PVEM governs a state: San Luis Potosí
- MC governs 2 states: Jalisco and Nuevo León
- Morena governs the remaining 23 states

== Specific jurisdictions ==
=== State of Mexico ===
The State of Mexico is governed according to the Constitution of the State of Mexico and the law of the State of Mexico. The previous constitutions of 1827, 1861, and 1870 were replaced in 1917. The government is composed of executive, legislative, and judicial branches. The executive branch includes the Governor, Cabinet, and Public Prosecutor; the legislative branch comprises the Congress of the State of Mexico; and the judicial branch consists of the Judicial Council, High Court of Justice, and inferior courts.

=== Yucatán ===
The Constitution of Yucatán provides that the government of Yucatán, like the government of every other state in Mexico, consists of three powers: executive, legislative, and judicial. Executive power rests in the governor of Yucatán, who is directly elected by the citizens, using a secret ballot, for a six-year term without reelection. Legislative power rests in the Congress of Yucatán, a unicameral legislature composed of 25 deputies. Judicial power is vested in the Superior Court of Justice of Yucatán.

=== Mexico City ===
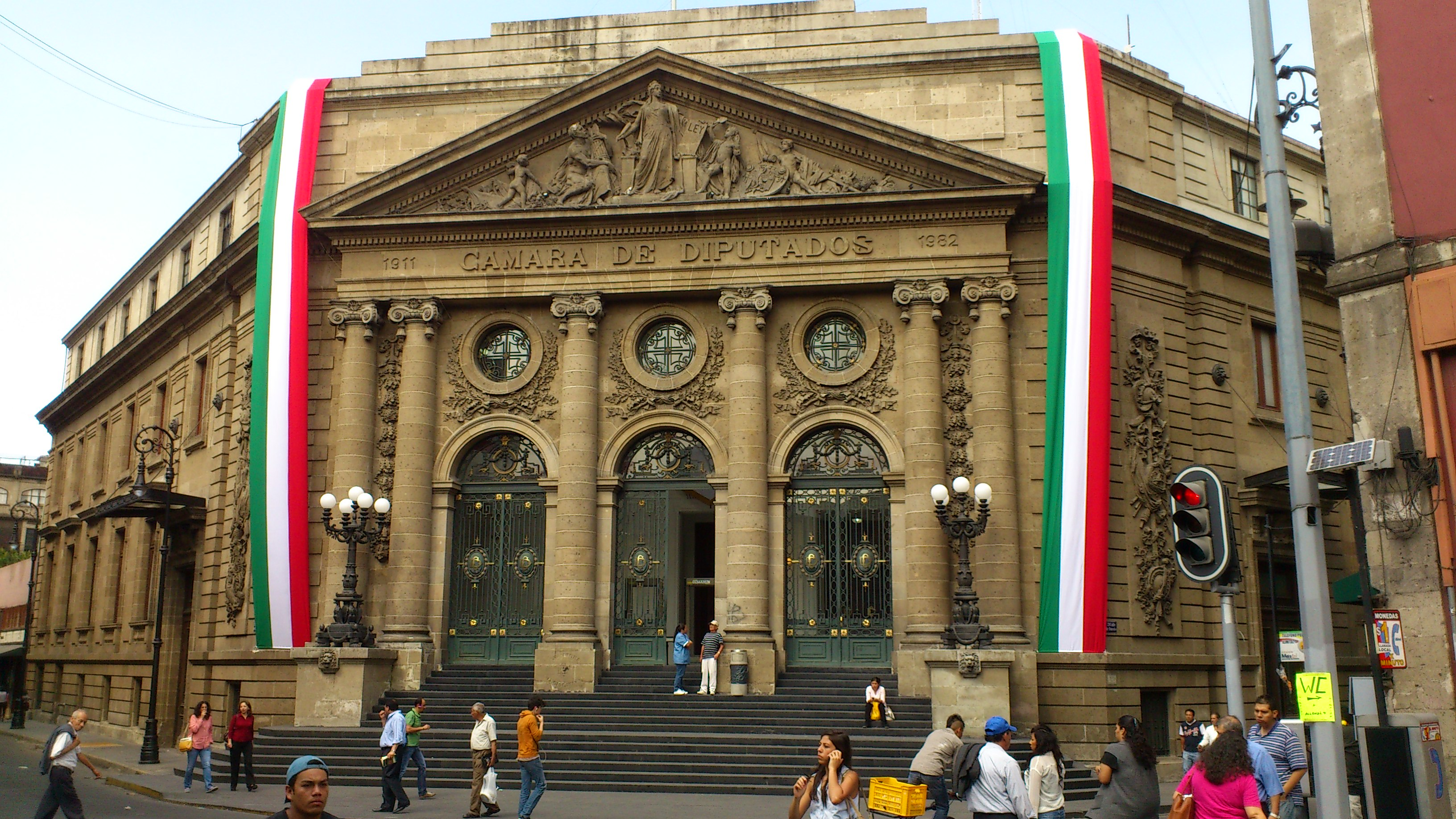
Congress of Mexico City

Mexico City does not belong to any state in particular but to the federation, being the capital of the country and the seat of the Powers of the Union. As such, it is constituted as a city, ultimately administered by the Powers of the Union. Nonetheless, since the late 1990s, some autonomy and local jurisdictional power have been gradually conferred. Executive power is vested upon a head of government now elected by first-past-the-post plurality. Legislative power is vested in a unicameral Congress. Judicial power is exercised by the Supreme Tribunal of Justice and the Judiciary Council.

Mexico City is divided into demarcaciones territoriales or boroughs. Though not fully equivalent to a municipality in that they do not have regulatory powers, they have gained limited autonomy in recent years, and the representatives to the head of government are now elected by the citizens as well.

== See also ==
- Administrative division
- Administrative divisions of Mexico
- Federal government of Mexico
- List of current state governors in Mexico
- List of Latin American countries by Human Development Index
- List of Mexican state demonyms
- List of Mexican state name etymologies
- List of Mexican states by area
- List of Mexican states by Human Development Index
- List of Mexican states by population
- Politics of Mexico
- Ranked list of Mexican states
- Territorial evolution of Mexico
