= Politics of Mexico =

Politics of Mexico Política de México
- Seal of the Government of Mexico
- Polity type: Federal presidential constitutional republic
- Constitution: Political Constitution of the United Mexican States

Legislative branch
- Name: Congress of the Union
- Type: Bicameral
- Meeting place: Legislative Palace of San Lázaro
- Upper house
- Name: Senate of the Republic
- Presiding officer: Higinio Martínez Miranda, President of the Senate of the Republic
- Lower house
- Name: Chamber of Deputies
- Presiding officer: Raúl Bolaños Cacho Cué, President of the Chamber of Deputies

Executive branch
- Head of state and government
- Title: President
- Currently: Claudia Sheinbaum
- Appointer: Direct popular vote
- Cabinet
- Name: Cabinet of Mexico
- Leader: President
- Appointer: President
- Headquarters: National Palace
- Ministries: 19

Judicial branch
- Supreme Court of Justice of the Nation
- Chief judge: Hugo Aguilar Ortiz
- Federal Electoral Tribunal
- Chief judge: Mónica Aralí Soto Fregoso

The politics of Mexico function within the framework of the federal presidential representative democratic republic whose government is based on a multi-party congressional system, where the President of Mexico is both head of state and head of government. The federal government represents the United Mexican States. It is divided into three branches: executive, legislative, and judicial, established by the Political Constitution of the United Mexican States, published in 1917. The constituent states of the federation must also have a republican government based on a congressional system established by their respective constitutions.

Executive power is exercised by the executive branch, headed by the President, who is advised by a cabinet of secretaries independent of the legislature. Legislative power is vested in the Congress of the Union, a two-chamber legislature comprising the Senate of the Republic and the Chamber of Deputies. Judicial power is exercised by the judiciary, consisting of the Supreme Court of Justice of the Nation, the Council of the Federal Judiciary, and the collegiate, unitary, and district tribunals.

== Framework of twentieth-century politics ==
The Mexican Revolution (1910–1920) followed the overturn of Porfirio Díaz's dictatorship and ended with a new Mexican government being established within the legal framework of the Constitution of 1917. The following regime can be considered a semi-authoritarian political model (or hybrid regime). In 1920, a successful general in the Revolution named Alvaro Obregón overthrew the temporary government of the revolutionary leader Venustiano Carranza, which resulted in his election as the President of Mexico. He was then replaced by Plutarco Elías Calles, who ruled Mexico from 1924 to 1928. After a rule change that prevented two mandates by the same person, Obregón returned to power in 1928 but was assassinated shortly after. As a result, outgoing president Calles founded a political party, the Partido Nacional Revolucionario (PNR), to solve the immediate political crisis of the assassination and to create a long-term framework for political stability, especially the transition of presidential regimes. The period from 1920–1934 in Mexico was marked by a strong presence of military in government and a failure to implement revolutionary reforms.

Under President Lázaro Cárdenas (1934–40), the party transformed into the Partido de la Revolución Mexicana, which was organized on a corporate basis, with peasants, labor, the popular sector, and the military each having a division, with power centralized. The PRM aimed to mediate conflicts between competing sectors within the party, becoming an extension of the Mexican state. In 1946, the party was transformed into the Institutional Revolutionary Party (PRI), and the army was no longer a sector. During this time, the government nationalized key industries, such as oil, and implemented land reforms that redistributed property to peasants.

Mexico experienced political tension and rising economic instability throughout the second decade of the twentieth century. The late 1960s and early 1970s saw multiple protests from students and left-wing groups against PRI's authoritarian rule, to which the government responded with a crackdown that culminated in the infamous Tlatelolco Massacre of 1968, in which hundreds of protesters were killed. However, the year 1982 gave way to market restructuring policies and gradual political reforms that prompted the democratic transition of Mexico (1982–2012). The first efforts to introduce free and fair elections came with President Miguel de la Madrid in 1983. Still, the attempt was unsuccessful, as he was opposed by politicians in his party.

The 1988 elections, won by Carlos Salinas de Gortari against Cuauhtémoc Cárdenas (son of former President Lázaro Cárdenas), were regarded as "the most fraudulent in Mexico's history.” In 1989, politicians of the PRI who rejected Salinas's pro-market reforms formed the Party of the Democratic Revolution. In the wake of the fraudulent 1988 elections, the administration of elections was taken out of the hands of the Mexican government's Ministry of the Interior (Gobernación), and the Instituto Federal Electoral (IFE) was created in 1990 to ensure free and fair elections and build public confidence in the process.

Logo of the National Revolutionary Party, 1929–1938

Logo of the Mexican Revolution Party, 1938–1946

Logo of the Institutional Revolutionary Party, 1946–

Logo of the National Action Party – the first opposition party to the PRI, 1939–

Logo of the leftist Party of the Democratic Revolution, 1989–2024

== Political parties ==
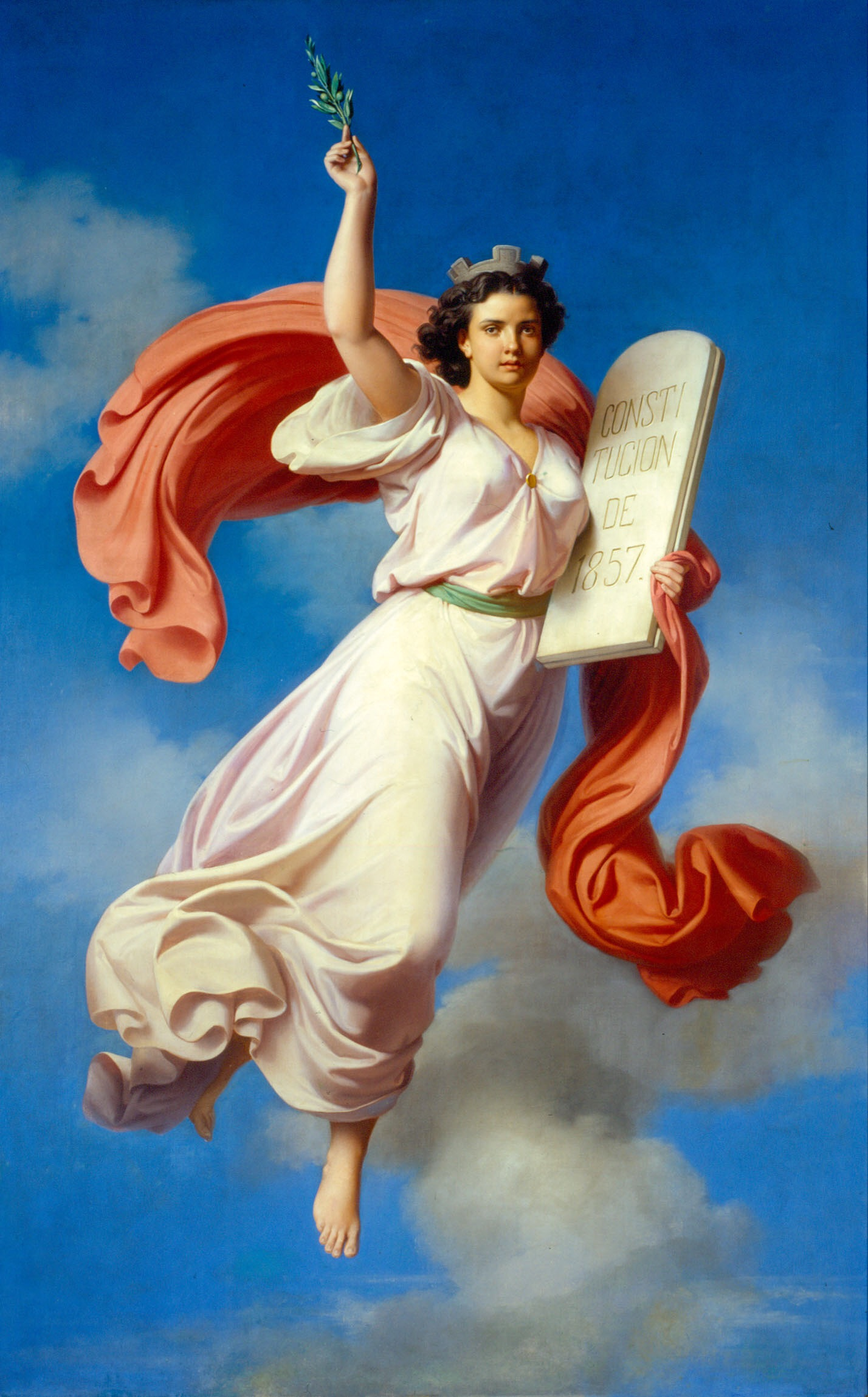
Allegory of the Constitution of 1857, by Petronilo Monroy, 1869.

Constitutionally, political parties in Mexico must promote the participation of the people in the democratic life of the country, contribute to the representation of the nation and citizens, and be the access through which citizens can participate in public office, through whatever programs, principles, and ideals they postulate. All political parties must be registered with the National Electoral Institute (Spanish: Instituto Nacional Electoral, INE), the institution in charge of organizing and overseeing the federal electoral processes, and must obtain at least 3% of votes in the federal elections to keep their registry. Registered political parties receive public funding for their operation and can also get private funding within the limits prescribed by the law. As of 2026, the following political parties are registered with the INE, and all have representatives in the Congress of the Union:

- The National Action Party (Partido Acción Nacional, PAN), founded in 1939;
- The Institutional Revolutionary Party (Partido Revolucionario Institucional, PRI), founded in 1929;
- The Green Ecological Party (Partido Verde Ecologista de México, PVEM), founded in 1986 but lost its registration for two consecutive elections; it has retained its registration since 1993;
- The Labor Party (Partido del Trabajo, PT), founded in 1990;
- Citizens’ Movement (Movimiento Ciudadano, MC), founded in 1999;
- The National Regeneration Movement (Morena), founded in 2014;

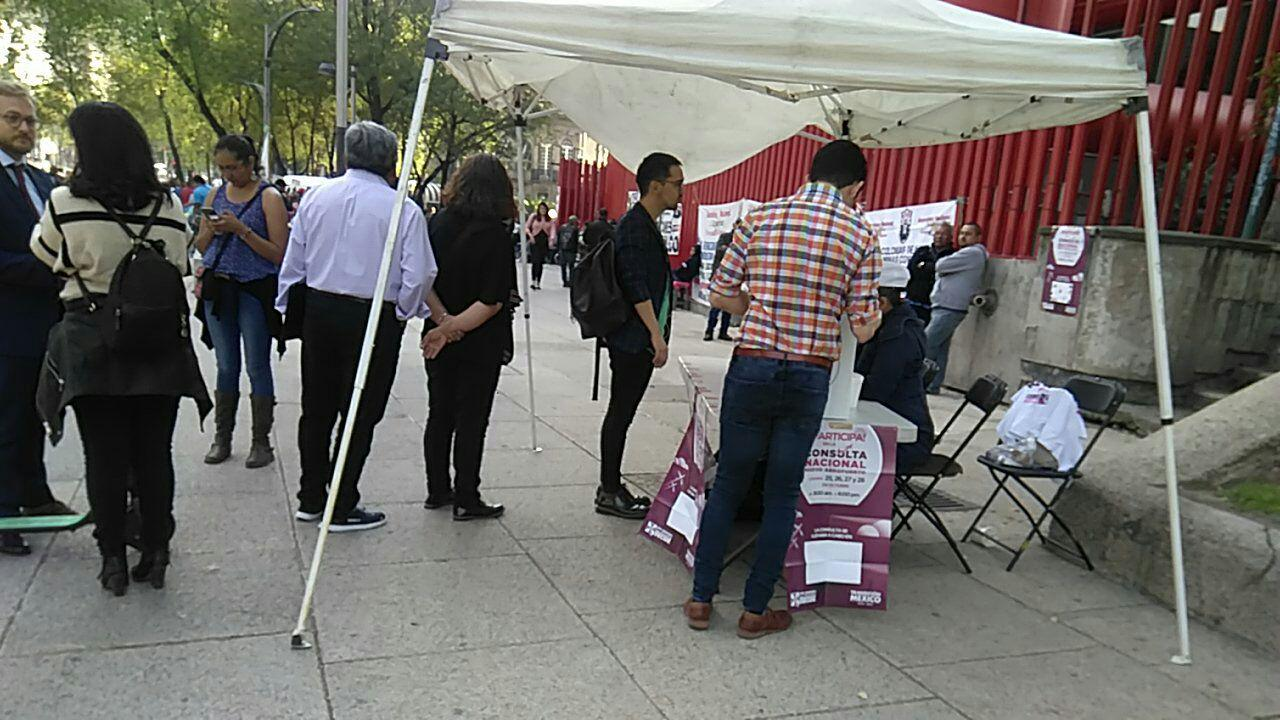
Public consultation

Political parties can form alliances or coalitions to nominate candidates for any particular election. The coalition must identify itself with a specific name and logo. Proportional representation (plurinominal) seats are assigned to it based on the percentage of votes obtained in the elections. Then, it reassigns them to the constituent political parties. Once each party in the coalition has been assigned plurinominal seats, they do not necessarily continue to work as a coalition in government.

Throughout the 20th century, the PRI had an almost hegemonic power at the state and federal levels, which slowly began to recede in the late 1980s. Even though since the 1940s, the PAN had won a couple of seats in Congress and its first presidential municipality (in Quiroga, Michoacán) in 1947, it wasn't until 1989 that the first non-PRI state governor was elected (in Baja California). It was in 1997 that the PRI lost its absolute majority in the Congress of the Union. In 2000, the first non-PRI President since 1929 was elected in what was regarded as the cleanest Mexican election since the end of the Mexican Revolution in 1920.

=== Major political parties ===
Parties that won seats in the 2024 Chamber of Deputies election. Results by constituency. Morena (maroon), Ecologist Green Party of Mexico (yellow-green), Labor Party (red), National Action Party (blue), Institutional Revolutionary Party (green), Party of the Democratic Revolution (yellow), and Citizens' Movement (orange).

Since c. 2014, four political parties have dominated the politics of Mexico: the Institutional Revolutionary Party (PRI), the National Action Party (PAN), the Party of the Democratic Revolution (PRD), and the National Regeneration Movement (Morena).

Founded in 1929 as the Partido Nacional Revolucionario ("National Revolutionary Party"), the PRI dominated Mexican politics for over 70 years, bringing to power 11 different governments.

The PAN, founded in 1939, did not win its first governorship until 1989; its candidates won the presidency in 2000 and 2006.

The PRD's beginnings date back to 1988 when dissident members of the PRI decided to challenge the leadership and nominated Cuauhtémoc Cárdenas for President of Mexico. Cárdenas lost in a highly contested election, but a new political party was born, and the party emerged as a third force in Mexican politics, even though it never captured the presidency.

Morena grew out of a dispute between Andrés Manuel López Obrador and other PRD leaders after losing in the 2012 presidential election. Morena won official recognition in 2014 and dominated the 2018 and 2024 elections.

According to a 2017 survey by the National Autonomous University of Mexico, 74 percent of Mexicans believe that Mexico's electoral system is not transparent and distrust official results. However, Freedom House shows that popular belief in free and fair elections has increased ever since. The main political issues in Mexico were crime, corruption and economy according to a 2026 Enkoll poll.

== Elections and political composition of the institutions ==
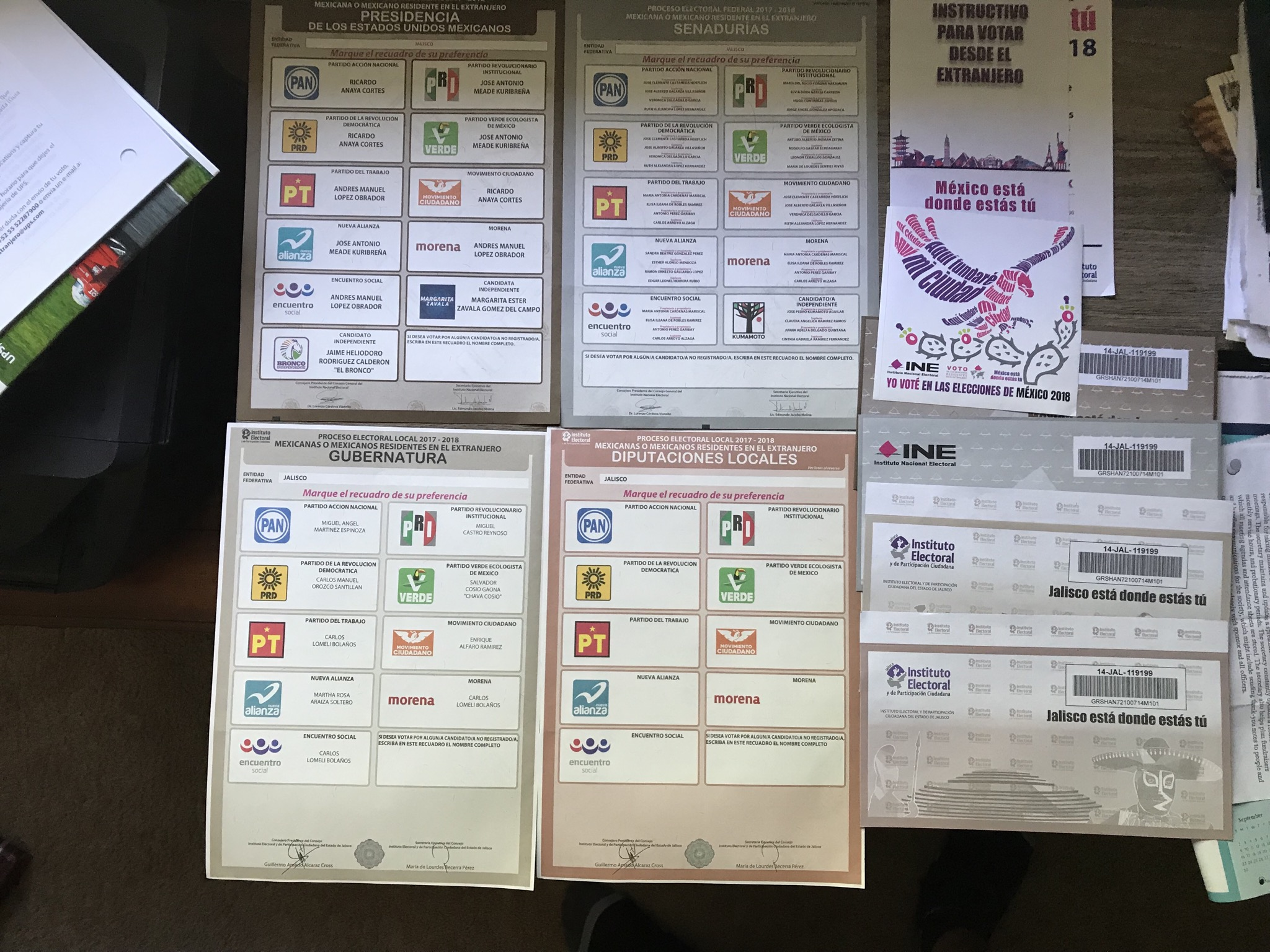
Election package received by Mexicans living abroad.

Suffrage is universal, free, secret, and direct for all Mexican citizens 18 and older and is compulsory (but not enforced). The identity document in Mexico also serves as the voting card, so all citizens are automatically registered for all elections; that is, no pre-registration is necessary for every election. All elections are direct; that is, no electoral college is constituted for any of the federal, state, or municipal elections. Only when an incumbent president is absent (either through resignation, impeachment, or death) does the Congress of the Union itself act as an electoral college to elect an interim president by absolute majority.

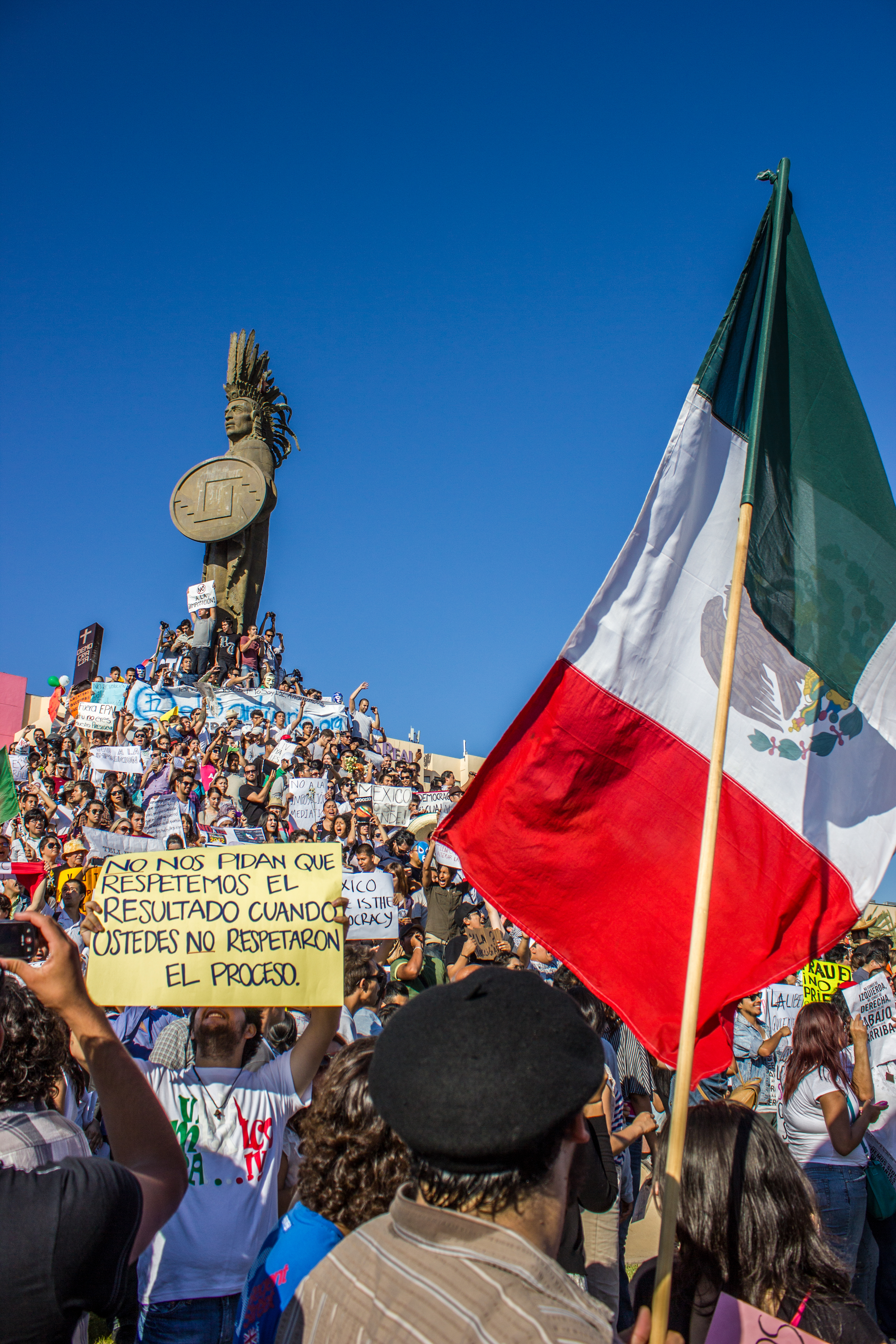
Anti-imposition protest in Tijuana.

Presidential elections are scheduled every six years, except in the exceptional case of the absolute absence of the President. However, former President Andrés Manuel López Obrador's term only lasted five years and ten months (December 1, 2018 — September 30, 2024) due to a Constitutional change. Legislative elections are scheduled every six years for the Senate, to be fully renewed in elections held concurrently with the presidential elections, and every three years for the Chamber of Deputies. Elections have traditionally been held on the first Sunday of July, but the new law means they will be held on the first Sunday in June instead. State governors are elected every six years. The state legislatures are renewed every three years. State elections need not be concurrent with federal elections. Federal elections are organized and supervised by the autonomous public Instituto Nacional Electoral. State and municipal elections are organized and supervised by electoral institutes constituted by each state. A local electoral institute also organizes elections within Mexico City. A strongly ingrained concept in Mexican political life is "no reelection." The theory was implemented after Porfirio Díaz monopolized the presidency for over 25 years. Currently, Mexican presidents are limited to a single six-year term, and no one who has held the office even on a caretaker basis is allowed to hold the office again. Deputies and senators were not allowed to succeed themselves immediately until 2018; both may now serve a maximum of 12 consecutive years.

=== Federal elections ===
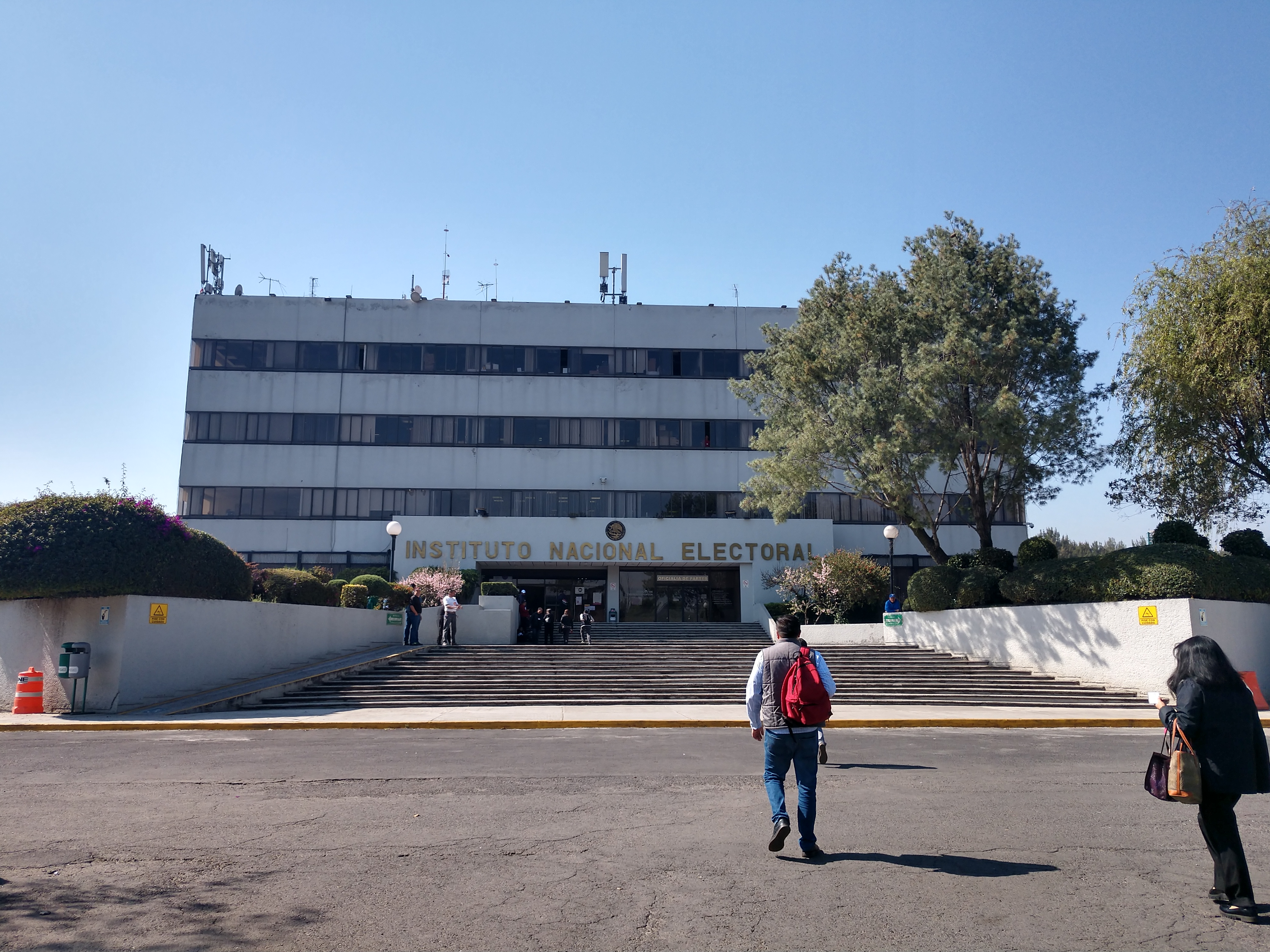
Instituto Nacional Electoral headquarters in Mexico City

==== 2006 ====
A federal presidential election was held on July 2, 2006, concurrent with renovating both chambers of the Congress of the Union. In this election, the Party of the Democratic Revolution (PRD), the Labor Party (PT), and Convergence (CV) formed a coalition called the Coalition for the Good of All. The Institutional Revolutionary Party (PRI) and the Ecologist Green Party (PVEM) formed a coalition called the Alliance for Mexico. The Federal Electoral Tribunal declared Felipe Calderón the winner on September 5 and president-elect. He took office on December 1, 2006, and his term ended on November 30, 2012. Any party did not contest the concurrent congressional elections. Both chambers were completely renewed, and no party obtained an absolute majority. This election has been noted by scholars, including Mexican sociologist Jacqueline Peschard, for the "breakdown in consensus that nearly resulted" as a result of the ensuing indeterminacy and the problems that it has posed for Mexican democracy.

==== 2012 ====
In 2012, Mexico elected Enrique Peña Nieto as President.

==== 2018 ====
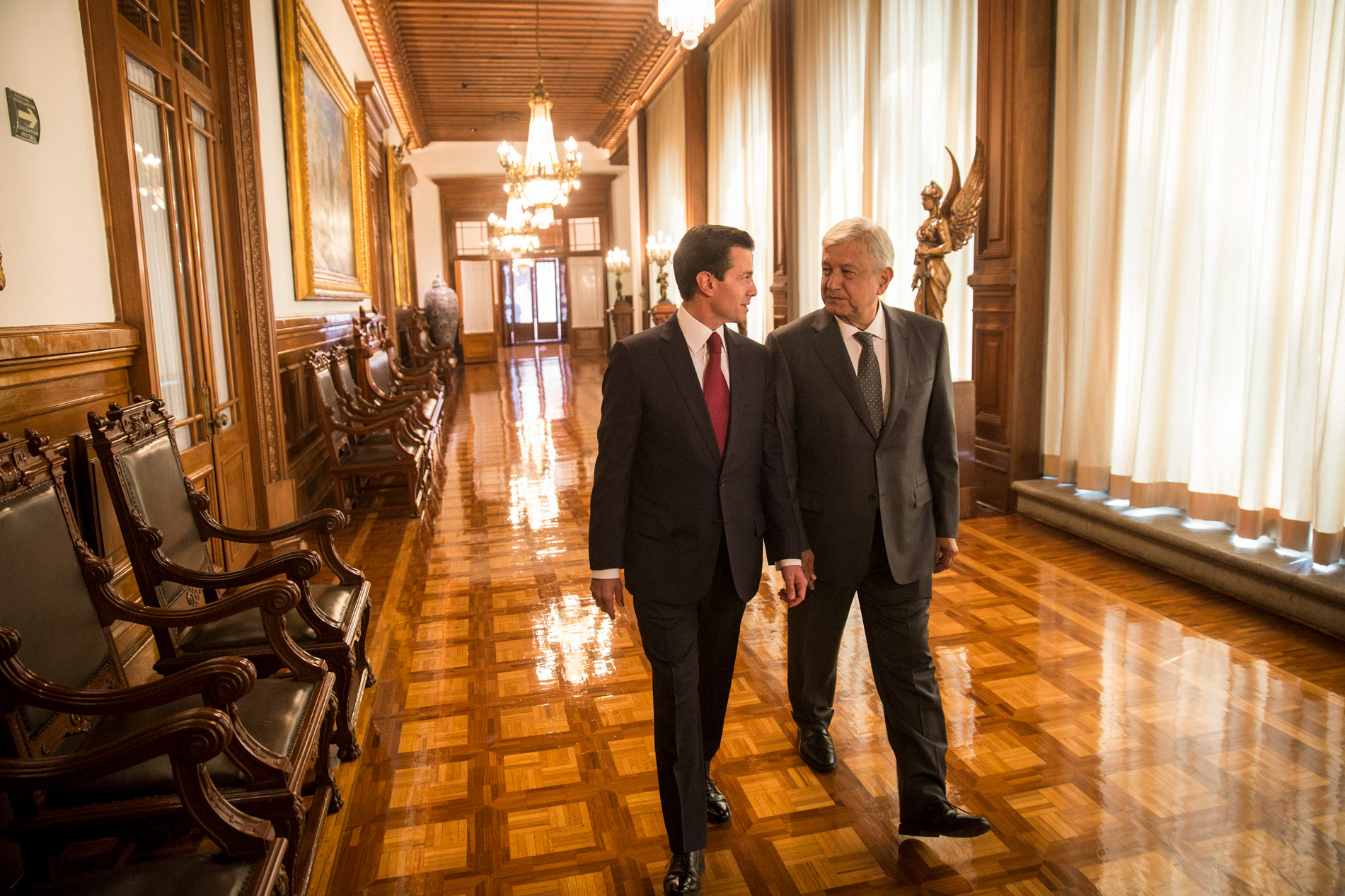
Meeting between Peña Nieto and López Obrador in the National Palace, 2018

In 2018, Mexico elected Andrés Manuel López Obrador as President. He ran under a three-party coalition led by the leftist National Regeneration Movement (Morena) party he founded in 2014.

==== 2024 ====
In 2024, Mexico elected Claudia Sheinbaum as President.

=== State elections ===
The elections in each state are done at different times, depending on the state, and are not necessarily held at the same time as the federal elections. As of 2026:

- The PRI governs 2 states: Coahuila and Durango.
- The PAN governs 4 states: Aguascalientes, Chihuahua, Guanajuato, and Querétaro.
- The PVEM governs a state: San Luis Potosí.
- MC governs 2 states: Jalisco and Nuevo León.
- Morena governs the remaining 23 states.

== Historical political development ==
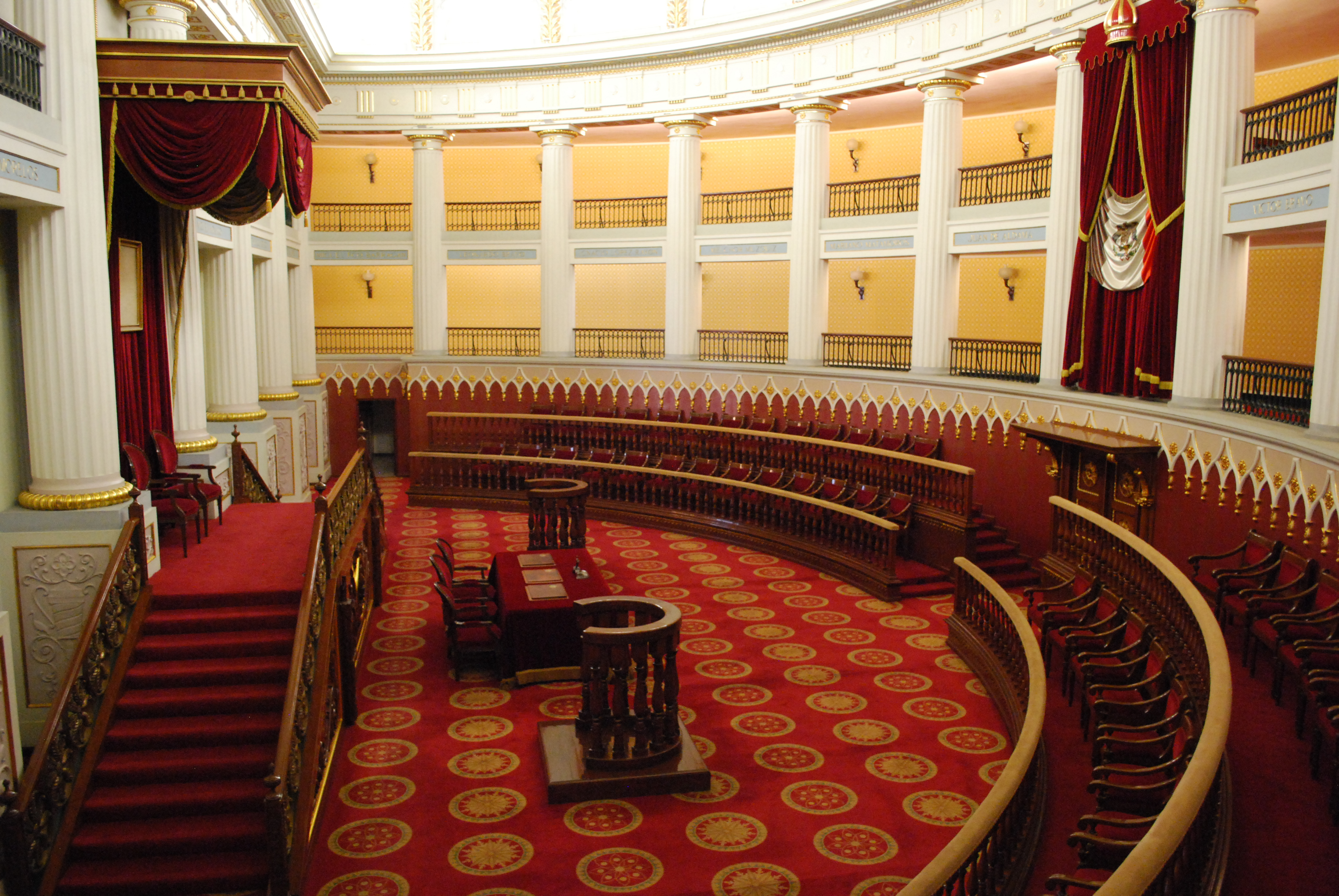
Parliamentary chamber inside the Palace; seat of the congress between 1829 and 1872.

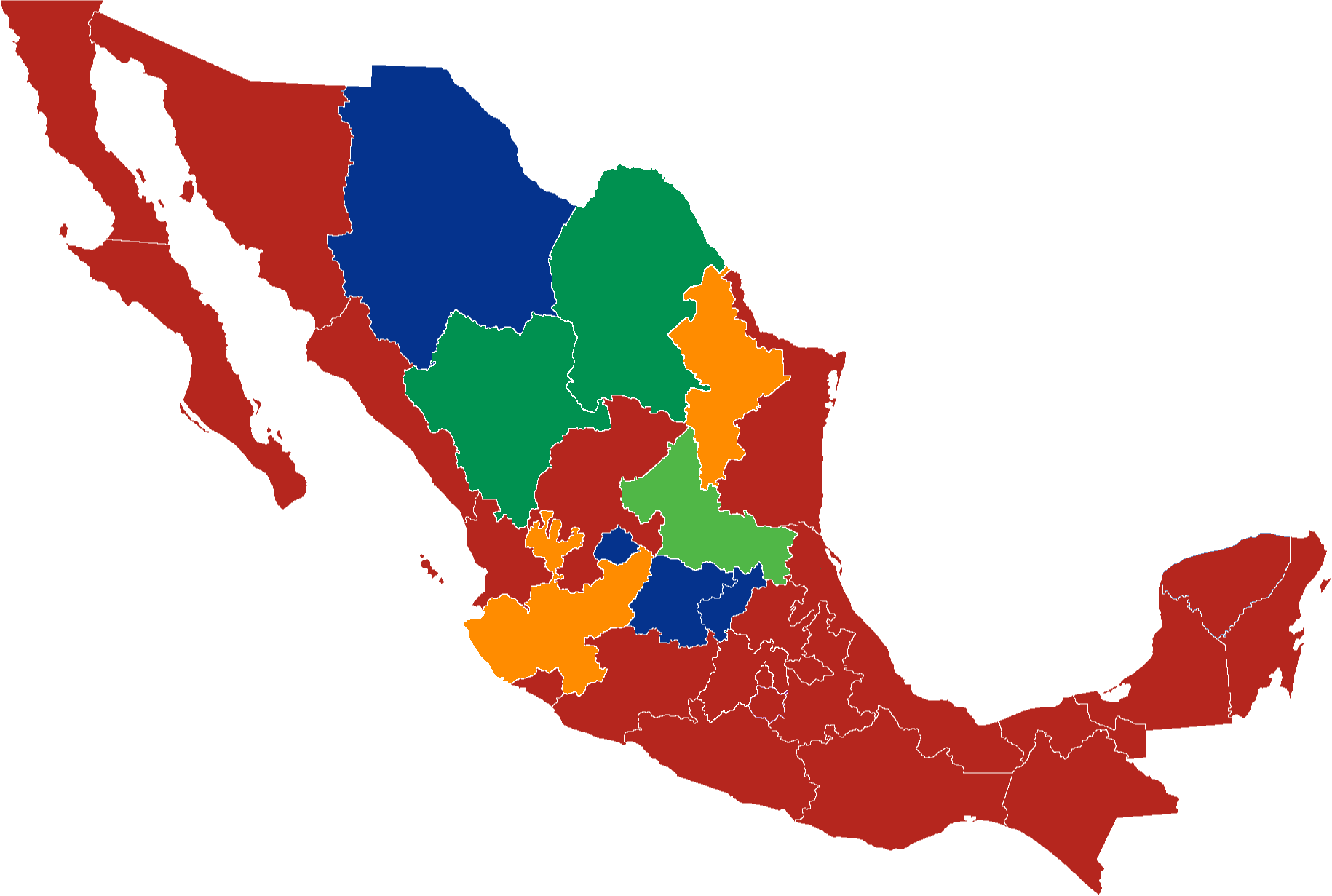
Mexican states governed by political party Morena PAN PRI MC PVEM

The Mexican Revolution (1910–1920) was followed by the Great Depression, which led to a severely fragmented society and fragile institutions. In 1929, all factions and generals of the Mexican Revolution were united into a single party, the National Revolutionary Party (NRP), to stabilize the country and end internal conflicts. During the following administrations, since 1928, many of the revolutionary ideals were put into effect, among them the free distribution of land to peasants and farmers, the nationalization of the oil companies, the birth and rapid growth of the Social Security Institute as well as that of labor unions, and the protection of national industries.

President Lázaro Cárdenas was fundamental to recovering some of the social control lost during the Revolution and the following economic meltdown in the United States. However, Cárdenas was followed by less-talented leaders who could not continue this path and establish an effective rule of law in Mexican society. Moreover, Cárdenas's presidency happened before the UN focused on states as the rule in the 1940s and 1950s.

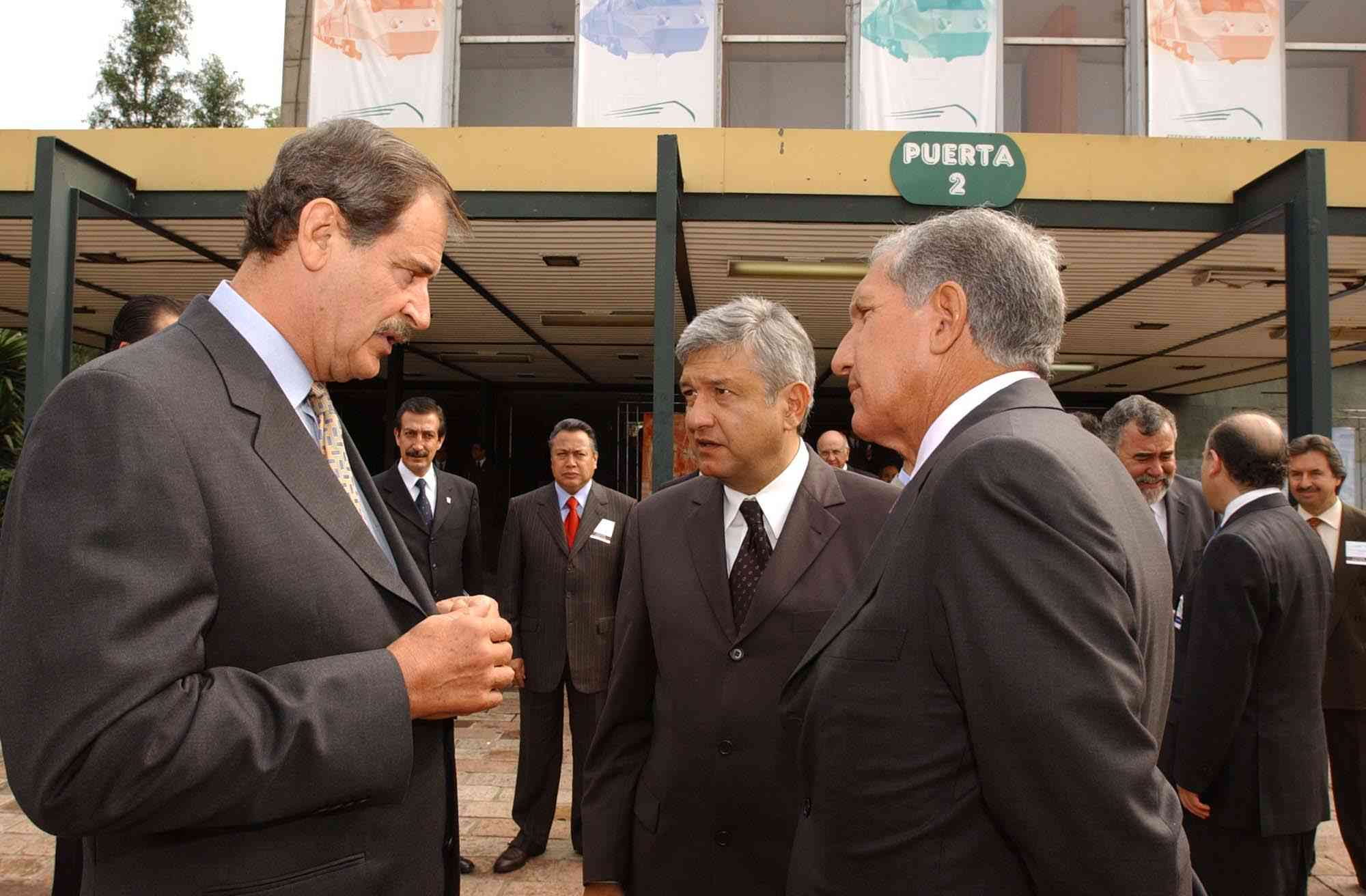
President Vicente Fox (left) with López Obrador (center) and former State of México governor Arturo Montiel (right).

The NRP was later renamed the Mexican Revolution Party and then the Institutional Revolutionary Party. The social institutions created by the PRI gave it the strength to stay in power. In time, the system gradually became, as some political scientists have labeled it, an "electoral authoritarianism" in that the party resorted to any means necessary, except for the dissolution of the constitutional and electoral system itself to remain in power. Mexico was considered a bastion of continued constitutional government when coup d'états and military dictatorships were the norm in Latin America, in that the institutions were renovated electorally, even if only in appearance and with little participation of the opposition parties at the local level.

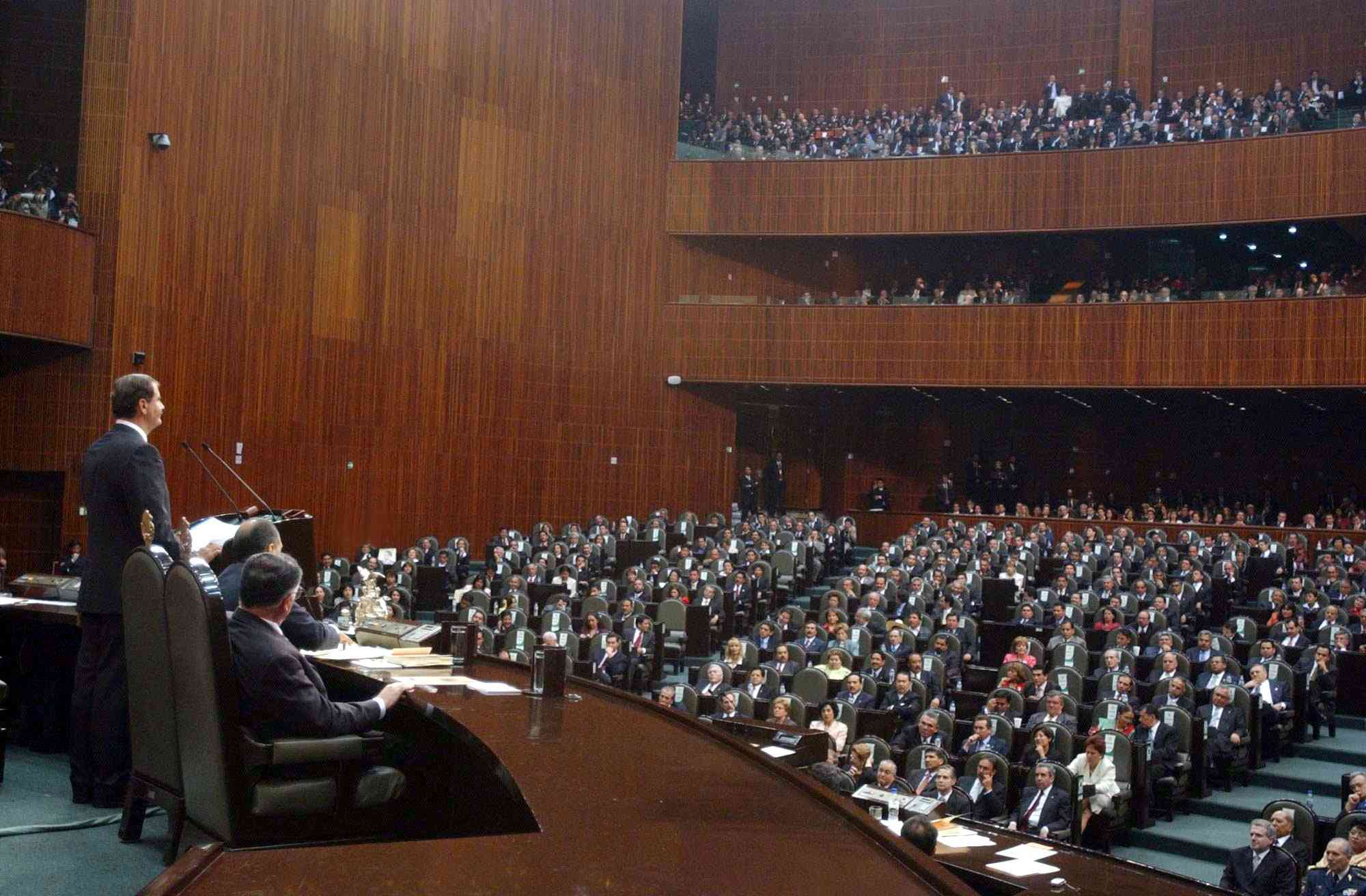
Mexico's President Vicente Fox (2000–2006) speaks before the Mexican people.

The first cracks in the system, even though they were merely symbolic, were the 1970s reforms to the electoral system and the composition of the Congress of the Union, which for the first time incorporated proportional representation seats, allowing opposition parties to obtain seats, though limited in number, in the Chamber of Deputies. As minority parties became involved in the system, they gradually demanded more changes and a full democratic representation. Even though in the 1960s, a couple of (over a total of more than two thousand) municipalities were governed by opposition parties, the first state government to be won by an opposition party was Baja California in 1989.

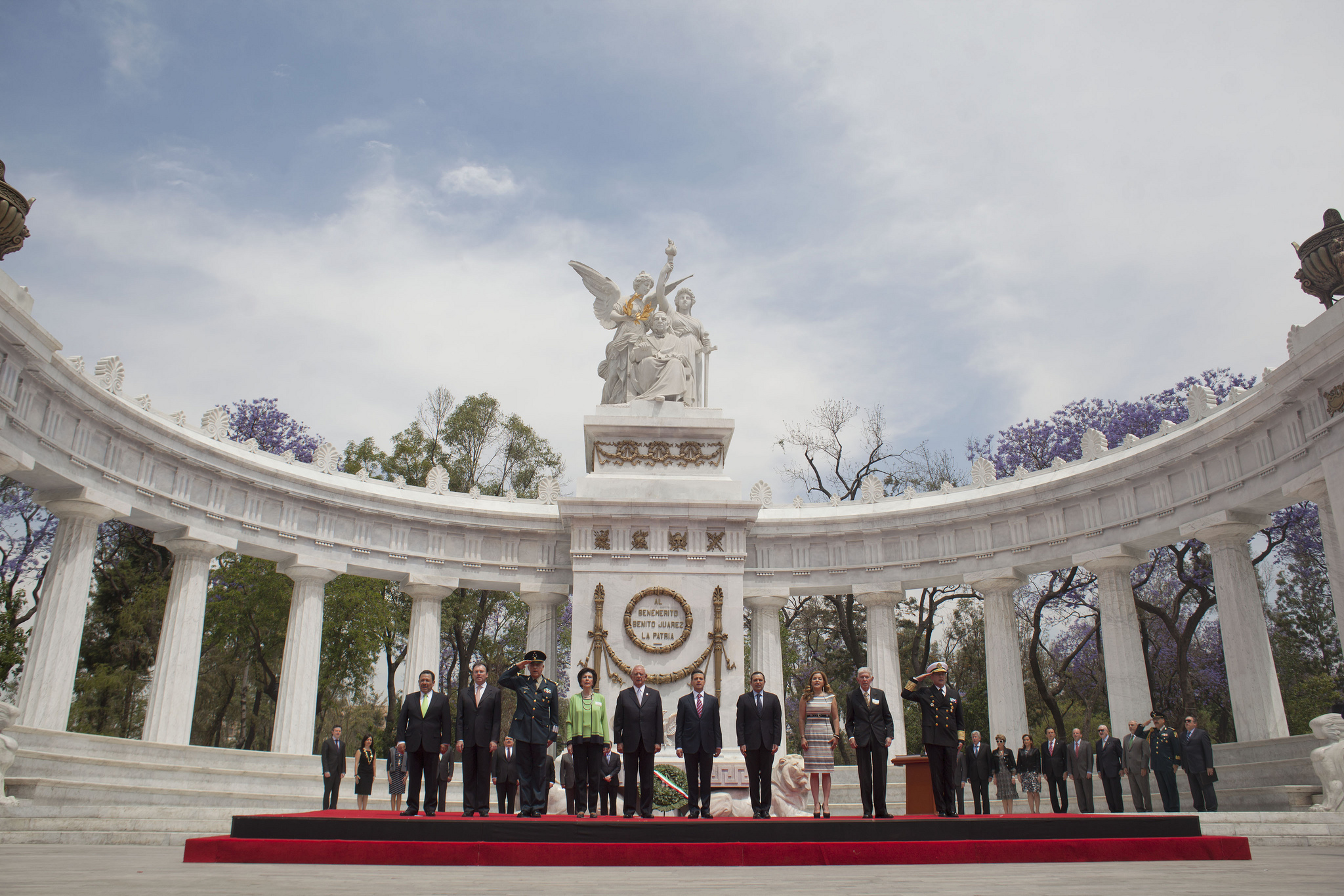
Anniversary of the Birth of the President Benito Juárez in the Alameda Central, 2013.

Historically, there were important high-profile defections from the Institutional Revolutionary Party, like the ones of Juan Andreu Almazán (1940), Ezequiel Padilla (1946), Miguel Henríquez Guzmán (1952), and Cuahtémoc Cárdenas (1988), son of President Lázaro Cárdenas. These departures happened mainly because they opposed the presidential candidate nominations; however, only Cárdenas's departure in 1988 resulted in the establishment of another political party (Party of the Democratic Revolution).

The presidential election held in 1988 marked a watershed in Mexican politics, as they were the first serious threat to the party in power by an opposition candidate: Cuauhtémoc Cárdenas, who was nominated by a broad coalition of leftist parties. He officially received 31.1 percent of the vote, against 50.4 percent for Carlos Salinas de Gortari, the PRI candidate, and 17.1 percent for Manuel Clouthier of the National Action Party (PAN). Some believed that Cardenas had won the election but that the then government-controlled electoral commission had altered the results after the infamous "the system crashed" (se cayó el sistema, as it was reported). In the concurrent elections, the PRI came within 11 seats of losing the majority of the Chamber of Deputies. Opposition parties captured 4 of the 64 Senate seats—the first time that the PRI had failed to hold every seat in the Senate. Capitalizing on the popularity of President Salinas, however, the PRI rebounded in the mid-term congressional elections of 1991, winning 320 seats.

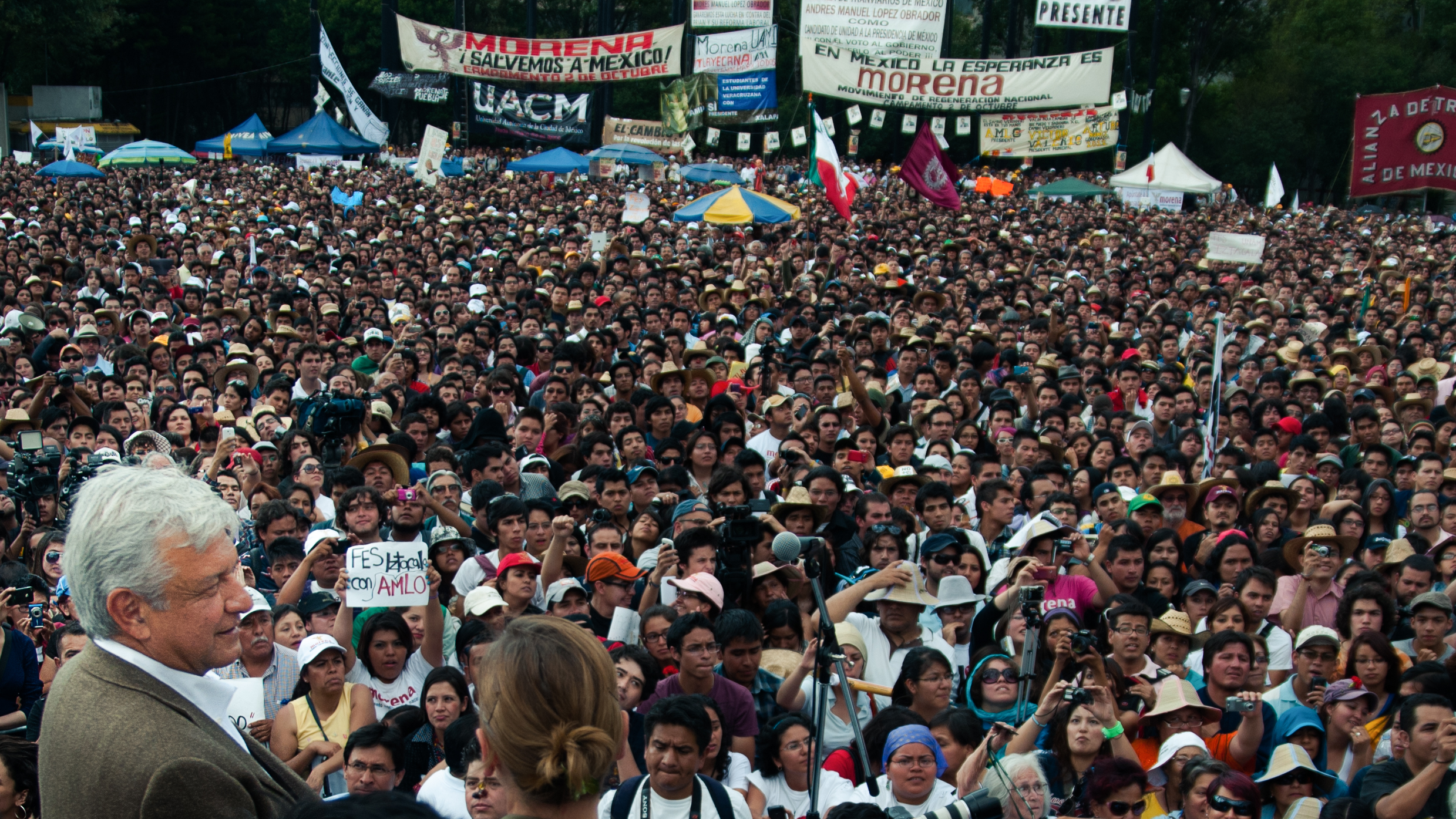
AMLO meeting with University students in Tlatelolco Square.

Subsequent changes included the creation of the Federal Electoral Institute in the 1990s, which included proportional representation and the first minority seats in the Senate. The presidential election of 1994 was judged to be the first relatively free election in modern Mexican history. Ernesto Zedillo of the PRI won with 48.7 percent of the vote, against 25.9 percent for Diego Fernández de Cevallos of the PAN and 16.6 percent for Cárdenas, who this time represented the Party of the Democratic Revolution (PRD). Although the opposition campaign was hurt by the desire of the Mexican electorate for stability, following the assassination of Luis Donaldo Colosio (the intended PRI candidate) and the recent outbreak of hostilities in the state of Chiapas, Zedillo's share of the vote was the lowest official percentage for any PRI presidential candidate up to that time.

In the 1997 midterm election, no party held a majority in the Chamber of Deputies, and in 2000, the first opposition party president was sworn in office since 1929. Vicente Fox won the election with 42.5% of the vote, followed by PRI candidate Francisco Labastida with 36.1%, and Cuauhtémoc Cárdenas of the Party of the Democratic Revolution (PRD) with 16.6%.

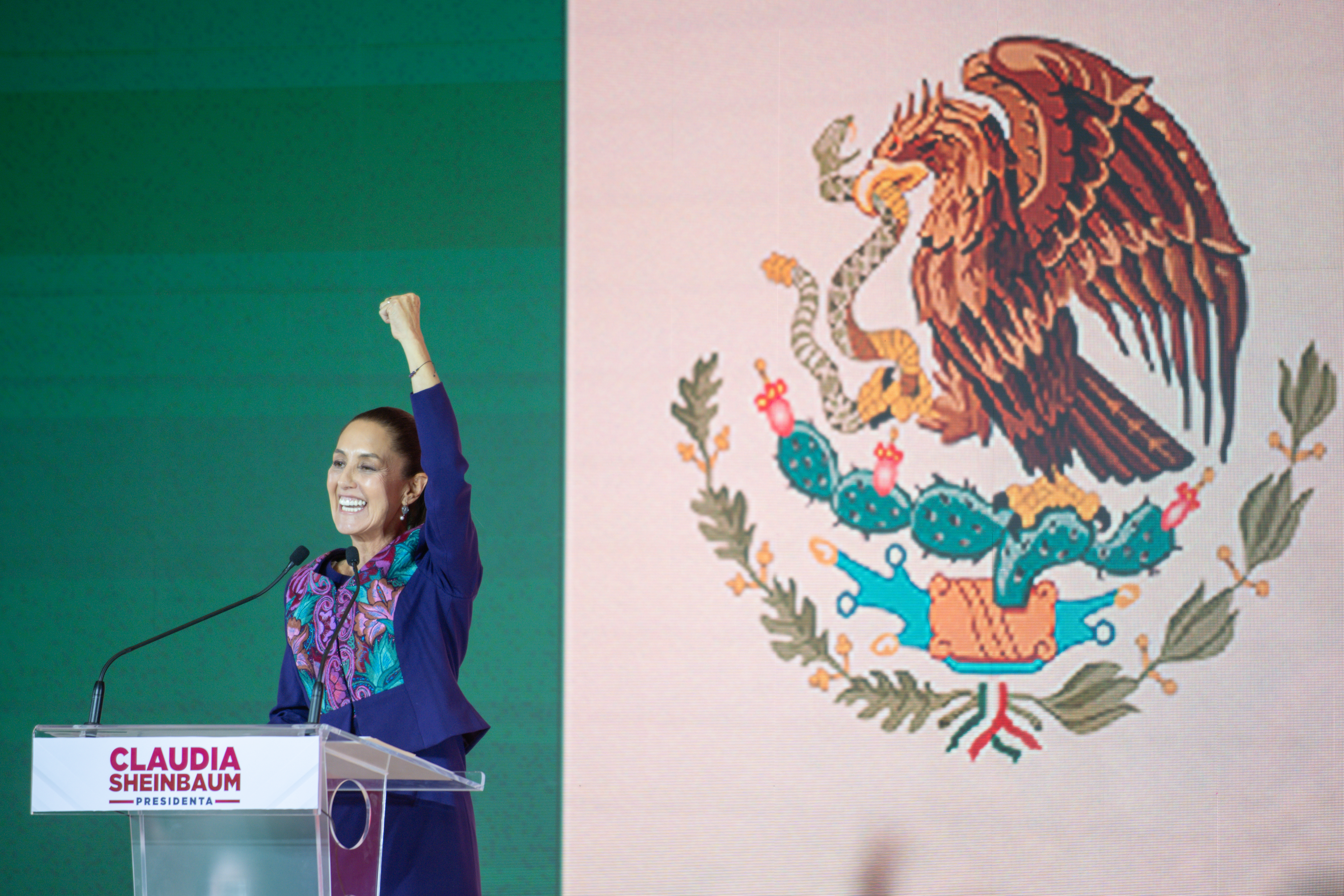
Claudia Sheinbaum during her victory speech on June 2, 2024. President-elect of Mexico, the first woman to be elected to the position.

Numerous electoral reforms implemented after 1989 aided in the opening of the Mexican political system, and opposition parties made historic gains in elections at all levels. Many current electoral concerns have shifted from outright fraud to campaign fairness issues. During 1995–96, the political parties negotiated constitutional amendments to address these issues. Implementing legislation included major points of consensus that had been worked out with the opposition parties. The thrust of the new laws is that public financing predominates over private contributions to political parties, tighter procedures for auditing the political parties and strengthening the authority and independence of electoral institutions. The court system was also given greatly expanded authority to hear civil rights cases on electoral matters brought by individuals or groups. In short, the extensive reform efforts have "leveled the playing field" for the parties.

The 2006 election saw the PRI fall to third place behind the PAN and the PRD. Roberto Madrazo, the presidential candidate, polled only 22.3 percent of the vote, and the party ended up with only 106 seats in the Chamber of Deputies, a loss of more than half of what the party had obtained in 2003, and 33 seats in the Senate, a loss of 27 seats. Felipe Calderón, a conservative former energy minister, won a narrow victory and was elected as the new President. Andrés Manuel López Obrador lost the tight race and did not accept the result.

In the 2012 election, Enrique Peña Nieto was elected President of Mexico, marking the return of the PRI after 12 years out of power.

On December 1, 2018, Andrés Manuel López Obrador was sworn in as Mexico's first leftist President in seven decades after winning a landslide victory in the 2018 election. In the 2021 midterm election, López Obrador's left-leaning Morena coalition lost seats in the lower house of Congress. However, his ruling coalition maintained a simple majority, but López Obrador failed to secure the two-thirds congressional supermajority. The main opposition was a coalition of Mexico's three traditional parties: the center-right Revolutionary Institutional Party, the right-wing National Action Party, and the leftist Party of the Democratic Revolution.

== See also ==
- Censorship in Mexico
- State governments of Mexico
- Federal government of Mexico
- Powers of the Union (Mexico)
- Law of Mexico
- History of democracy in Mexico
