= Powers of the Union (Mexico) =

The Powers of the Union (Poderes de la Unión, in Spanish) is a constitutional term to refer to the three branches of the Mexican government jointly:

- the executive power, the president of the United Mexican States;
- the legislative power, the Congress of the Union, and
- the judicial power, the Supreme Court of Justice of the Nation.

These are the three branches of government, or powers, of the federated "Union" of the thirty-one constituent states. The Powers of the Union are also referred to as the Supreme Power of the Federation (Supremo Poder de la Federación). Mexico City is constitutionally defined as the federal district and seat of the "Powers of the Union".

== See also ==
- Politics of Mexico
