= Constitution of the State of Mexico =

Former constitutions of Mexico

The Political Constitution of the State of México (Spanish: Constitución Política del Estado de México) is the constitution of the State of Mexico. The previous constitutions of 1827, 1861, and 1870 were replaced in 1917.

== See also ==
- List of constitutions of Mexico
- State of Mexico
- Constitution of Yucatán
