= Constitution of Yucatán =

Supreme law of Yucatán, Mexico

Political Constitution of the State of Yucatán
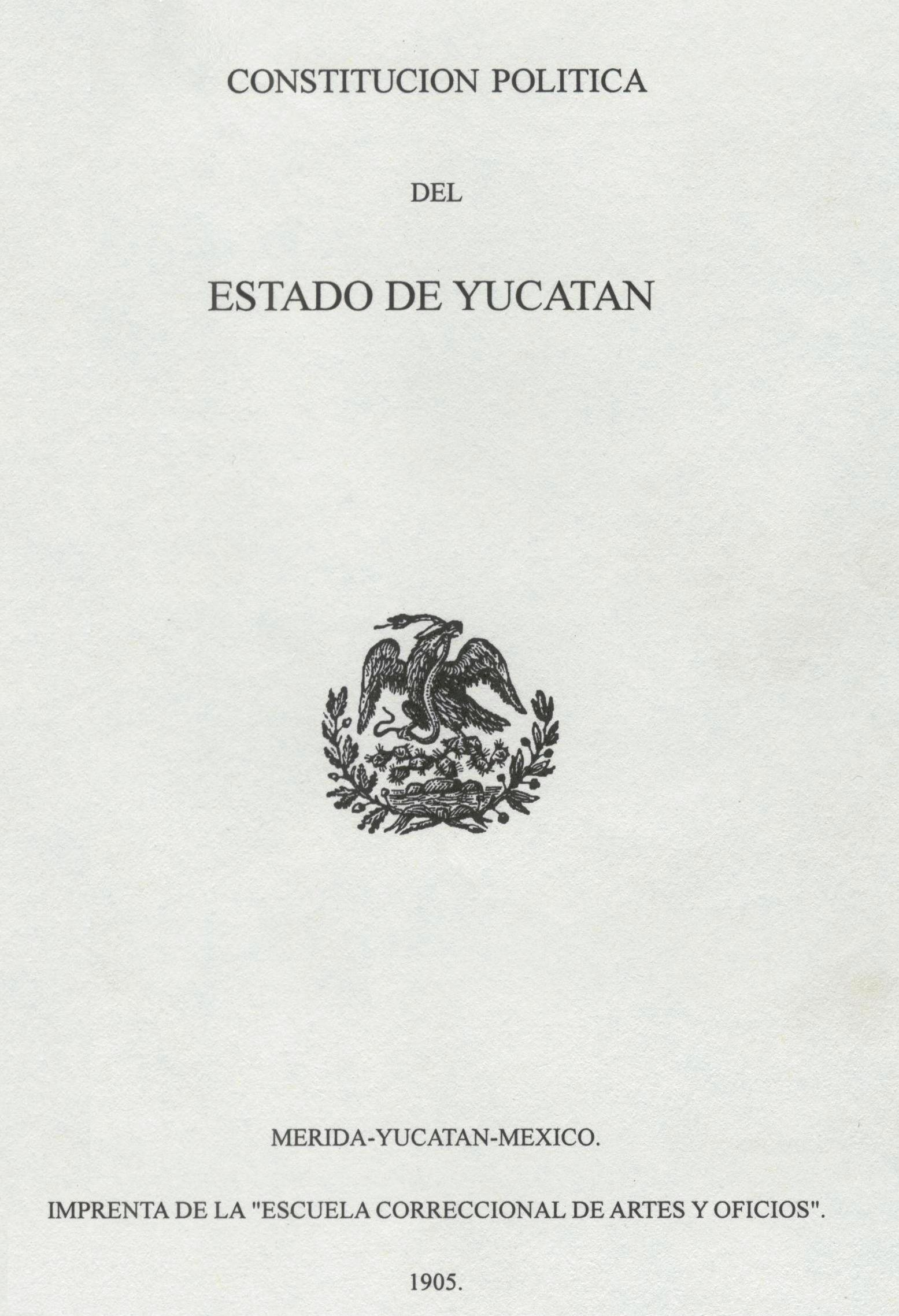
- Original front of the 1905 Constitution
- Created: 1904–1918
- Ratified: January 14, 1918
- Location: Archivo General del Estado de Yucatán
- Author: XXXIV Constituent Congress of the State of Yucatán
- Signatories: XXXIV Constituent Congress of the State of Yucatán
- Purpose: State constitution to replace the 1862 Constitution

The Political Constitution of the State of Yucatán (Spanish: Constitución Politica del Estado de Yucatán) is the constitution which legally governs the free and sovereign state of Yucatán, one of the 32 federative entities of the United Mexican States. It was drafted by the Constituent Congress of State, chaired by Héctor Victoria Aguilar in 1918 and promulgated by General Salvador Alvarado, pre-constitutional governor of Yucatán. The most important reforms were made in 1938, although its text has been revised and partially renovated over the 20th century and continues to be reformed so far.

The current Constitution is historically the fifth constitution of the State of Yucatán; which includes the first publication of 1905, the second and official publication in 1918 and reform of 1938.

== Historical elements of the Constitutions of Yucatán ==
Over nearly two centuries, Yucatán has had five constitutions, each of these constitutions was adapted to the circumstances of the times in which they were enacted and consequently has formed the current text of the constitution of the state of Yucatán.

=== First Constitution (1825) ===
When the independence of Mexico was achieved, Yucatán also reached its independence and joined the ephemeral Mexican Empire. The Empire was overthrown in 1823, the provinces of the empire became independent and almost immediately Yucatán, Jalisco, Oaxaca and Zacatecas declared themselves free and sovereign states. Yucatán installed its First Congress on August 20, 1823 chaired by José María Quiñones. While Congress was preparing the constitution that would govern Yucatán, was issued a decree which was temporarily adopted the Spanish Constitution of 1812 known as the Constitution of Cádiz. On April 6, 1825 was promulgated the first Constitution of the "Free State" of Yucatán, in which was established that the Republic of Yucatán would be, popular, representative and federated with the Mexican federation.

==== Relevant articles ====
As in the Constitution of Cádiz, this constitution began under the name of "Almighty God". It gave prominence to Legislative over the Executive and Judiciary. Also was mentioned human rights that would later be recorded in the constitutions of Mexico as individual rights.

The most relevant articles were:

- Article 1. The State of Yucatán is the reunion of all the inhabitants of this peninsula and its adjacent islands.
- Article 4. The State is obligated to conserve and protect ... equality, liberty, property and safety of individuals within. Therefore prohibits the importation of slaves within its territory and declared free to those who are within.
- Article 5. The territory of the Republic of Yucatán is currently the same as that extended the former Intendancy less the province of Tabasco.
- Article 11. The state religion is Roman Catholic Apostolic: This protects it with wise and just laws and prohibits the exercise of any other.
- Article 12. No alien shall be persecuted or harassed for his religious beliefs, while he respects of the state.
- Article 13. The Yucatán state government is republican, federal, and popular representative.

The Constitution could not be applied to 100% due to two centralist strokes which put the states subject to central government of Mexico. Deleted were articles 2, 3 and 4 which granted the sovereignty of Yucatán and in addition many terms were changed with regards to the Senate and a lot of articles were modified. This would result in future Yucatán independence during the period of the Centralist Republic.

=== Second Constitution (1841) ===
It was promulgated on May 16, 1841, two months after the raising of the Flag of the Republic of Yucatán on March 16, 1841 and five months before the signing of the Declaration of Independence of the Yucatan Peninsula, which was enacted on October 1, 1841. It is considered that the main author of this text was the jurist Manuel Crescencio Rejón who would later bring to the Federal Constitution of Mexico the Amparo Law. The second constitution was divided into 80 articles y 3 transitional or temporary, establishing the direct popular election, bicameralism (Chamber of Deputies and Chamber of Senators) and an outstanding, the Freedom of religion.

==== Relevant articles ====
The constitution began under the name: The people of Yucatán recognized by divine goodness by allowing us to organize a government which demands our particular needs, using the right of all human societies has awarded the Sovereign Ruler of the Universe.

- Article 1. Are Yucatecan:
  1. The born and resident in the territory of the State.
  2. The foreign-born with parents of Yucatan...
  3. Foreigners who obtain... certificate of naturalization.
- Article 7. (Divided into 12 sections that speaks of individual guarantees)
- Article 8. (Amparo law) The judges of first instance shall protect in the enjoyment of rights, guaranteed in the previous article...
- Article 10. The State public power for its exercise is divided into Legislative, Executive and Judicial and may not come together in two or one person or institution.
- Article 11. Legislative power is deposited in two cameras, one of deputies and one of senators.
- Article 79. None may be harassed about their religious views and both those who come to settle in the country, as their descendants, shall have guaranteed private and public exercise of their religions.

=== Third Constitution (1850) ===
Yucatán was in a turbulent era due its recent reunification to Mexico, issued on August 17, 1848. and the Caste War, the main reason for rejoining. At the same time, Mexico was economically and morally devastated by the recent war against the United States, the loss of nearly 55% of its territory and its eternal struggle between federalism and centralism.

As a result of that, a new State Constitution was enacted on September 16, 1850. Was based mainly on the Constitution of 1825 but it also was incorporated some articles of the Constitution of 1841. Its editors were the Deputies Manuel González, Pablo Lanz, Manuel Alonzo Peón, Vicente Solís Rosales and José María Vargas, those serving on a committee for this purpose. Was divided into 59 articles; the first said that Yucatán was part of the Mexican Nation as was established in the Federal Pact. It was deleted the Amparo law and was re-established the indirect popular election, maintaining the separation of powers and bicameralism.

==== Relevant articles ====
It's believed that this Constitution represented a throwback to individual rights and political rights of Yucatecan citizens.

- Article 1. Yucatán is an integral part of the Mexican Nation, according to the principles of the federal pact.
- Article 2. The state religion is Roman Catholic Apostolic
- Article 9. (Individual Rights) Freedom of speech, etc.
- Article 10. All Yucatecan are obligated to enforce laws, to defend the country when required by law and pay taxes enacted by Congress.
- Article 59. After a year... this Constitution may be amended, added or modified...

=== Fourth Constitution (1862) ===
The fourth constitution of the state was enacted on April 21, 1862 under provisional Governor Liborio Irigoyen. It was expanded to 114 articles and its main influence was the Federal Constitution of the United Mexican States of 1857, but it also was influenced by the 1850 Constitution of Yucatán.

In this Constitution the Catholic Church ceased to be the official religion. Campeche no longer belonged to the state of Yucatán; bicameralism was replaced by unicameralism, direct popular election was re-established and the governor's term was reduced from four to two years, prohibiting his re-election to the term immediately following.

This constitution was suspended with the establishment of the Second Mexican Empire, but was re-established when the Empire was overthrown. Due this constitution having been in force for nearly 50 years altogether, several changes were made during its term.

==== Relevant articles ====
The constitution began with the text: Representatives of the State of Yucatán, gathered in Congress to constitute the foundation established under the federal pact of the United Mexican States, decree and sanction the following Political Constitution.

- Article 1. The state of Yucatán is an integral part of the Mexican Republic, under the principles of the federal pact, is free, sovereign and independent... and only delegated powers to the Supreme Powers of the Nation for its good and the preservation of the union of the States....
- Article 2. (About the state's territory)
- Article 3. Its form of government is republican, popular, representative and the basis of its institutions are human rights guaranteed in section one of the federal constitution of 1857.
- Article 4. The state doesn't protect particularly the exercise of any religion.
- Article 17. The sovereignty of the state of Yucatán resides essentially and originally in the people....

=== Fifth Constitution (1918) ===
The 1918 Constitution is the Constitution currently in force. As it has been in force for more than 100 years, many modifications have been to its original text. Enacted on January 14, 1918 was drafted by the XXV Legislature of Congress of the State using as a model the text of Political Constitution of the United Mexican States of 1917, drafted on February 5, 1917, as a result of the Mexican Revolution.

The XXV Legislature was composed, among others, largely by Héctor Victoria Aguilar (who had been deputy constituent in Queretaro in 1917, during the preparation of the current Political Constitution of Mexico; he is considered the father of Mexican social rights for his contributions to article 123), Felipe Carrillo Puerto, Santiago Burgos Brito, Manuel Berzunza y Pedro Solís Cámara. The Enciclopedia Yucatán en el Tiempo says about the original text of Yucatecan Constitution of 1918:

"...considered at that time as the most liberal and the most advanced of modern Mexico"

==== Relevant articles of current Constitution ====
The current text has the same 109 articles in 11 titles that the original text of 1918 but has been modified throughout its term (more than 750 times altogether).

Among its main articles are:

- Article 1. All inhabitants of the State of Yucatán enjoy the guarantees granted by the Constitution of the United Mexican States, the arising from international agreements or treaties, in which the Mexican State is member, and those established in this Constitution.
  The State of Yucatán recognizes, protects and guarantees the right to life of all human being... and from the moment of conception among under the protection of the law....
- Article 2. (Individual rights, prohibition of all forms of discrimination, multicultural nature of population, protection to domestic and foreign migrants, Mayan identity and special rights of Mayan population.)
- Article 5. Are Yucatecan: I.- All born in or outside the territory of the State of Yucatan parents; II.- Nationals originating from other States of the Republic, who had resided in the State six consecutive months; and III.- Foreigners who are naturalized in accordance with the laws of the Republic and who have resided in the State six consecutive months.
- Article 7 Bis. Which recognizes the right to self-determination of the Mayan people, under a regional framework in line with the State unit?
- Article 12. The State of Yucatan is an integral part of the United Mexican States: and is free and sovereign in all that concerns their internal government, according to the principles established in the Federal Constitution
- Article 14. The Territory of the State of Yucatán has the extension and limits that demarcates the Federal Constitution; it constitutes the northern part of the Yucatan Peninsula, which is limited by a dividing line, starting from the northeast corner follows the arc of the meridian 87 degrees, 32 minutes (longitude west of Greenwich), to its intersection with the parallel 21 degrees; and there continues to find the parallel that passes through the south tower of the Church of Chemax, 20 km to east of this point; after reaching the apex of the angle formed by the lines dividing the states of Yucatan and Campeche, near Put....
- Article 90. The inhabitants of the State have the right to education and culture, understood as a social prerogative.
- Article 90. Paragraph A. Fraction II. With regard to education of the Mayan people, will have special attention from the State, access shall be ensured through legislation and programs that contribute to their own development....
- Article 95 Bis. The State shall ensure, protect and promote the social, economic, political and cultural development of the Mayan people....

== See also ==
- Constitutions of Mexico
- Yucatán
- Constitution of the State of Mexico
- Republic of Yucatán
