= Yucatán =

State of Mexico

- State
- Free and Sovereign State of Yucatán; Estado Libre y Soberano de Yucatán (Spanish); U Péetluʼumil Yúukatan (Yucatec Maya)
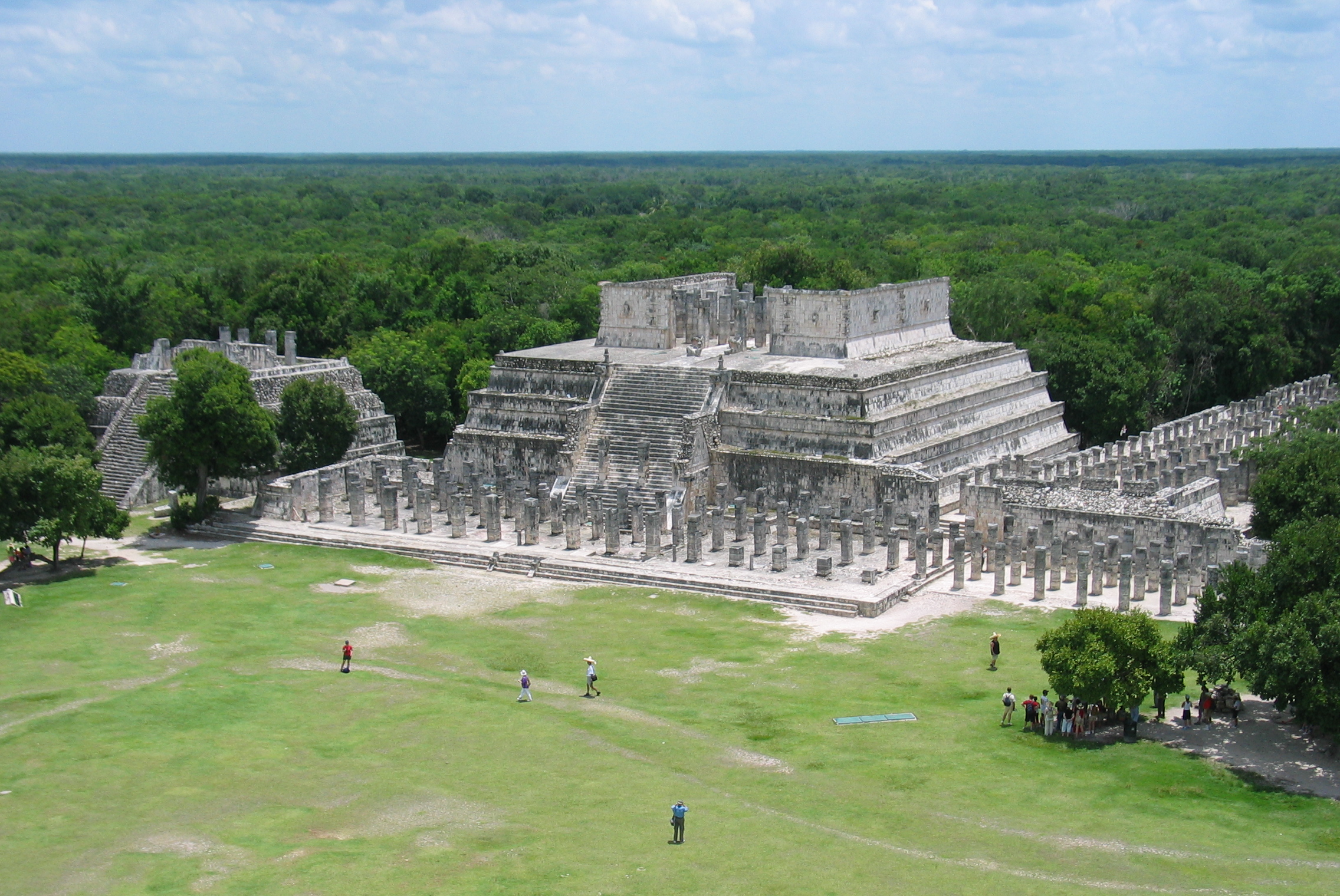
- Temple of the Warriors (part of Chichen Itza)

- Flag Coat of arms
- Nickname: La Hermana República de Yucatán ("The sister Republic of Yucatán")
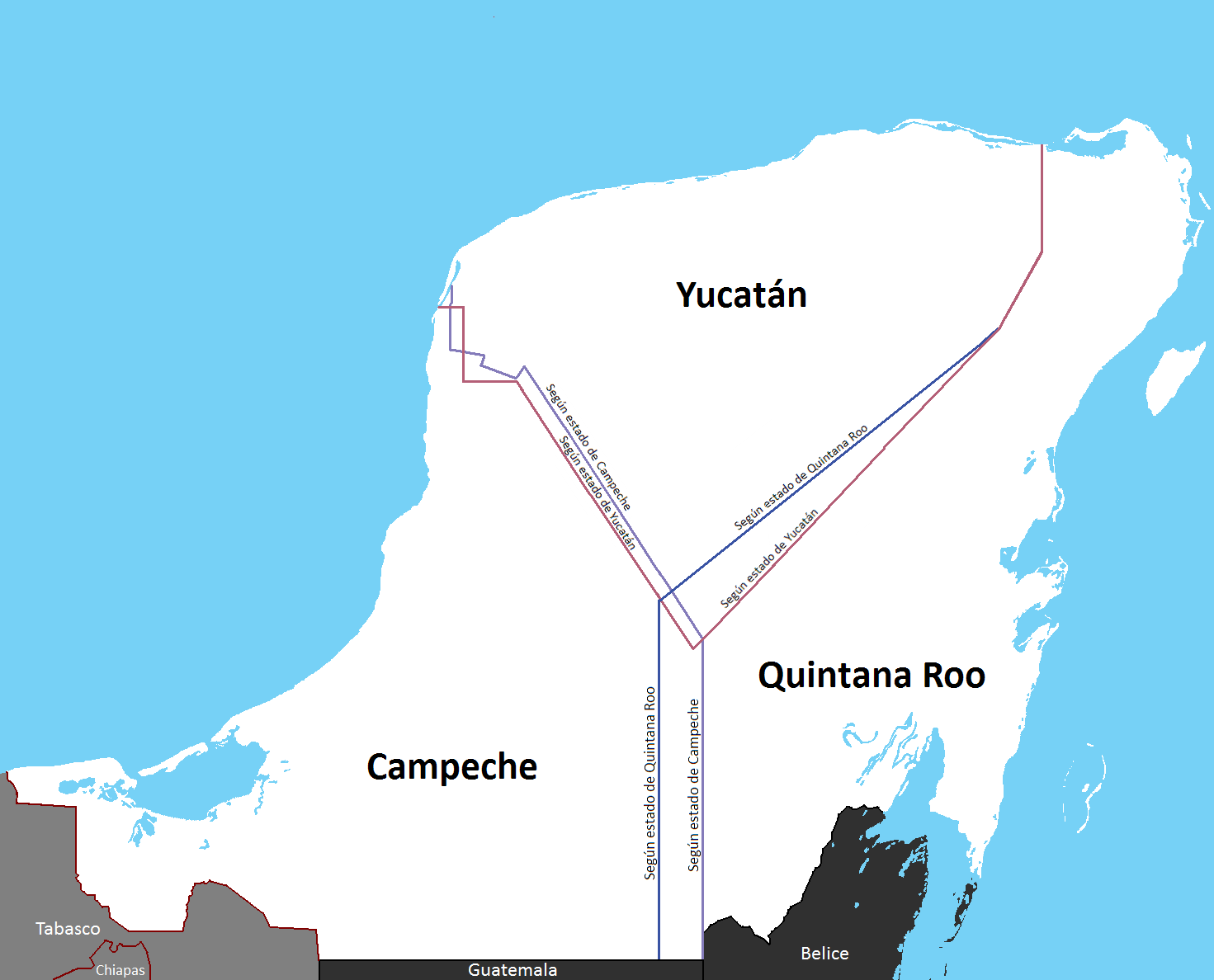
- Coordinates: 21.0°N 89.6°W
- Country: Mexico
- Capital and largest city: Mérida
- Largest metro: Greater Mérida
- Municipalities: 106
- Admission: December 23, 1823
- Order: 8th (Note: Joined the federation under the name Federated Republic of Yucatán, and included the modern states of Yucatán, Campeche and Quintana Roo.)

Government
  - Governor: Joaquín Díaz Mena
  - Senators: Jorge Carlos Ramírez Marín; Verónica Camino Farjat; Raúl Paz Alonzo
  - Deputies: Federal Deputies: • Sergio Chalé Cauich (1st); • Mario Xavier Peraza Ramírez (2nd); • Rommel Pacheco (3rd); • Beatriz Zavala (4th); • Consuelo del Carmen Navarrete Navarro (5th)

Area
  - Total: 39,524 km^{2} (15,260 sq mi)
- Ranked 20th
- Highest elevation: 210 m (690 ft)

Population (2020)
  - Total: 2,320,898
  - Rank: 21st
  - Density: 58.721/km^{2} (152.09/sq mi)
  - Rank: 17th
- Demonym: Yucateco (a)

GDP (2022)
  - Total: MXN 428 billion (US$21.3 billion)
  - Per capita: US$8,996
- Time zone: UTC−6 (CST)
- Postal code: 97
- Area code: Area codes: • 969; • 985; • 986; • 988; • 991; • 997; • 999
- ISO 3166 code: MX-YUC
- HDI: ▲0.784 high Ranked 19th of 32
- Website: Official website

Yucatán, (Note: /ˌjuːkəˈtɑːn, -ˈtæn/ YOO-kə-TA(H)N, UK also /ˌjʊk-/ YUU-; Spanish: [ɟʝukaˈtan]; Yucatec Maya: Yúukatan, pronounced [ˈjúːkatan]) officially the Free and Sovereign State of Yucatán, (Note: Spanish: Estado Libre y Soberano de Yucatán; Yucatec Maya: U Péetluʼumil Yúukatan.) is one of the 31 states which, along with Mexico City, constitute the 32 federal entities of Mexico. It comprises 106 separate municipalities. The capital and largest city is Mérida. Merida is the primate city of Yucatan, with its metropolitan area, including some of the states largest cities like Kanasin and Uman, being 15 times more populated than the agglomeration of Valladolid, and holding the highest cultural, economic, and financial dominance over the state. Greater Merida holds around of 50% the states 2.3 million people.

Located on the northern part of the Yucatán Peninsula, it is bordered by the states of Campeche to the southwest and Quintana Roo to the southeast, with the Gulf of Mexico off its northern coast.

Before the arrival of Spaniards, the peninsula was a very important region for the Maya civilization that reached the peak of its development here, where the Maya founded the cities of Chichen Itza, Izamal, Motul, Mayapan, Ek' Balam, and Ichkanzihóo (also called T'ho), now Mérida.

After the Spanish conquest of Yucatán (early 16th to late 17th centuries), the Yucatán Peninsula became a single administrative and political entity, the Captaincy General of Yucatán. Following Mexican independence in 1821 the local Governor proclaimed independence. Yucatán became part of the First Mexican Empire in December 1821. Following the collapse of the Empire in March 1823, the first Republic of Yucatán (founded in May 1823) voluntarily negotiated annexation to the Federal Republic of United Mexican States on December 21, 1823. On March 16, 1841, as a result of cultural and political conflicts around the federal pact, Yucatán declared its independence from Mexico, forming a second Republic of Yucatán. Eventually on July 14, 1848, Yucatán was forced to rejoin Mexico. In 1858, in the middle of the Caste War of Yucatán, the state of Yucatán was divided for the first time, establishing Campeche as a separate state (officially in 1863). During the Porfiriato, in 1902, the state of Yucatán was divided again to form the Federal territory that later became the present state of Quintana Roo.

== Etymology ==
Before the arrival of Spaniards in the Yucatán Peninsula, the name of this region was Mayab. In the Yucatec Maya language, mayab means "flat", and is the source of the word "Maya" itself.

The name Yucatán, also assigned to the peninsula, came from the early explorations of the Conquistadors from Europe. Three different explanations for the origin of the name have been proposed.

The first two state that the name resulted from confusion between the Maya inhabitants and the first Spanish explorers around 1517:

- According to one of them, Spaniards gave the name of Yucatán to the region because the Maya answered their questions with the phrase uh yu ka t'ann, which in the Maya language means hear how they talk.
- It is also said that it came from the answer of an indigenous Maya to the question of a Spanish explorer, who wanted to know the name of the region. The Maya probably replied Ma'anaatik ka t'ann which means in the Maya language I do not understand your speech or I do not understand you.

Probably the first person to propose the "I do not understand" version was the friar Toribio de Benavente Motolinía. In his book Historia de los indios de la Nueva España (History of the Indians of New Spain) he says

because talking with those Indians of the coast, whatever the Spanish asked the Indians responded: Tectetán, Tectetán which means I don't understand you, I don't understand you; they corrupted the word, and not understanding what the Indians said, they said: Yucatán is the name of this land; and the same happened in a place, a cape, which they also called Cape Cotoch; and Cotoch in that language means house.

The third proposed explanation comes from Bernal Díaz del Castillo. In his book Historia verdadera de la conquista de la Nueva España (True History of the Conquest of New Spain), he says Yucatá means "land of yucas", a plant that was cultivated by the Maya and was an important food source for them.

== History ==
=== Pre-Columbian era ===
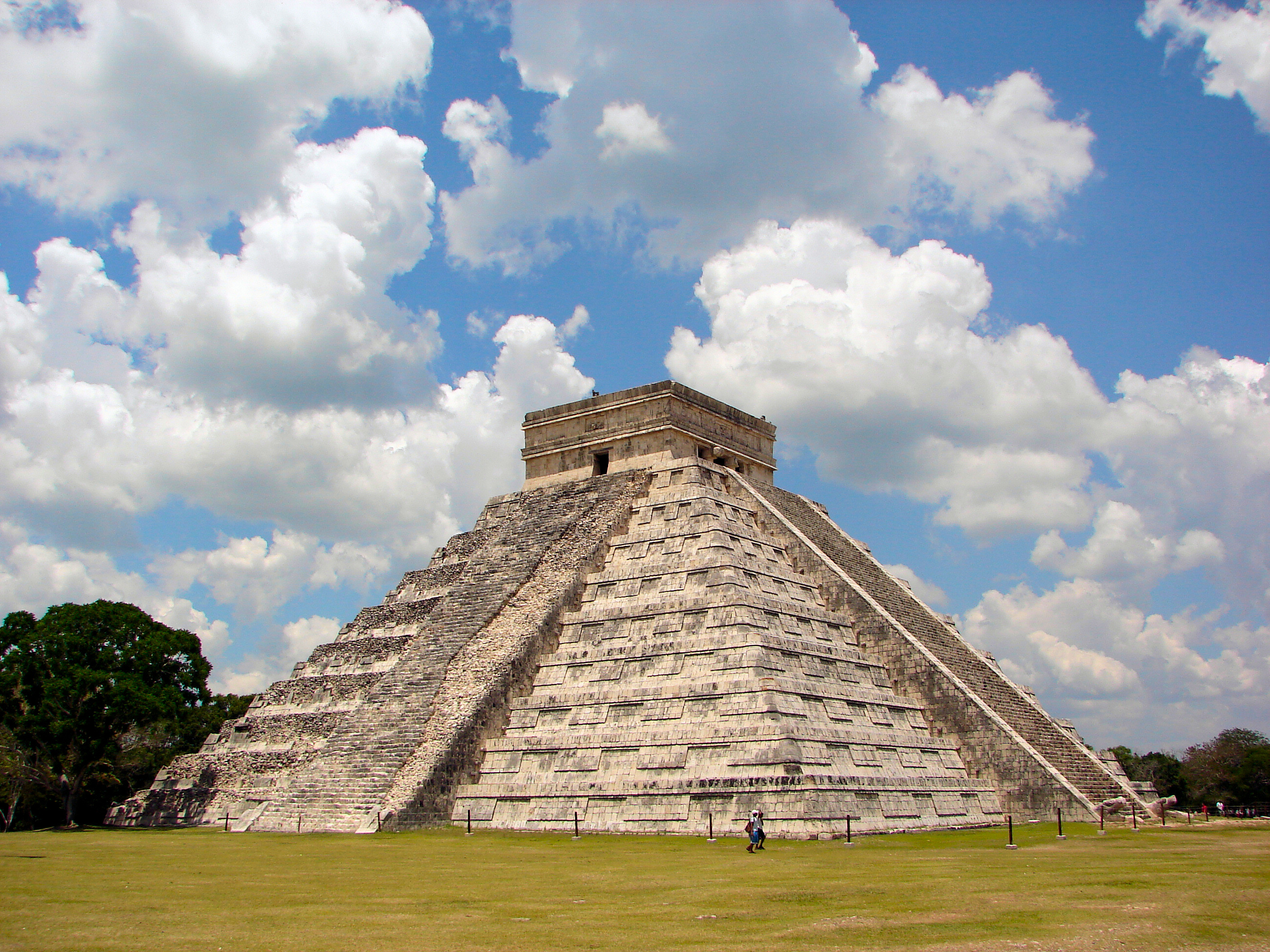
Temple of Kukulcan in Chichén Itzá, also known as "El Castillo"

The origin of the first settlements has not been scientifically confirmed, although the presence of first humans in the area dates from the late Pleistocene or ice age (about 10,000–12,000 years), according to the findings in the Loltún caves and caverns of Tulum (Women of the Palms).

The first Maya moved to the Peninsula circa 250 CE, from the Petén (today northern Guatemala), to settle the southeastern peninsula in the modern Bacalar, Quintana Roo. In 525, the Chanés (Maya group that preceded the Itza), moved to the east of the peninsula, founding Chichén Itzá, Izamal, Motul, Ek' Balam, Ichcaanzihó (modern Mérida) and Champotón.(Molina Solís 1896, p. 33) Later, Tutul Xiúes, Toltec descent, who came from the coast of the Gulf of Mexico, settled in the region causing displacement of the Itza and Cocomes—a diversified branch of Itzá—and finally, after years and many battles, the League of Mayapan (composed of the Itza, the Xiús and Cocomes) was formed, which eventually disintegrated circa 1194, giving way to a period of anarchy and fragmentation into small domains which the Spanish conquistadors found in the 16th century.

=== Exploration by Spanish soldiers ===
In 1513, Juan Ponce de León had already conquered the island of Borinquén (now Puerto Rico) and had visited Florida. Antón de Alaminos, who was with Ponce de León on this latest discovery, suspected that west of Cuba they could find new land. Under their influence, Diego Velázquez de Cuéllar, supported by the governor of Cuba, organized an expedition commanded by Francisco Hernández de Córdoba to explore the seas west of the island.

This expedition sailed from port of Ajaruco on February 8, 1517, to La Habana and after circling the island and sailing southwest by what is now known as the Yucatán Channel, the expedition made landfall at the Yucatán Peninsula on March 1. There are discrepancies about where the first explorers arrived. Some say it was in Isla Mujeres. Bernal Díaz del Castillo places it at Cabo Catoche, where they saw a great city which they named the «Gran Cairo».

=== Spanish conquest ===
The conquest of Yucatán was completed two decades after the Spanish conquest of the Aztec Empire by Francisco de Montejo "el Adelantado", his son Francisco de Montejo y León "el Mozo" and his nephew, Francisco de Montejo "el Sobrino". El Adelantado was in the expedition of Juan de Grijalva and was with Hernán Cortés in the third expedition that eventually became the Conquest of the Aztec Empire. He was subsequently appointed for the conquest of the Maya of Yucatán, but failed in his first attempt in 1527–28. In 1529 he was appointed Governor of Tabasco, with the order to pacify Tabasco and conquer Yucatán and Cozumel.

From Tabasco, Montejo led a new campaign to Yucatán from the west (1531–35) and failed again in his attempt for conquest. Circa 1535, after many bloody battles with the natives, he reached the complete pacification of the Province of Tabasco and began planning his new foray to Yucatán.

El Adelantado was appointed governor of Honduras and then of Chiapas. Therefore, he gave his son "El Mozo", the mission to consummate the conquest of Yucatán. Francisco de Montejo y León "el Mozo" founded the cities of San Francisco de Campeche on October 4, 1540, and Mérida on January 6, 1542 (in honor of Mérida, Extremadura). The city of Mérida was founded over the ruins of the Maya city of Ichkanzihóo (T'ho) and the stones of old Maya buildings were used for the new buildings. Later, government powers were changed from Santa María de la Victoria, Tabasco, to Mérida on June 11, 1542. The newly founded Mérida was besieged by the Maya troops of Nachi Cocom (overlord or 'Halach uinik' in Yucatec Maya language). It was a definitive battle for the Conquest of Yucatán. With that victory, the Spaniards consolidated their control of the western part of the peninsula.

Francisco de Montejo "El Adelantado" appointed his nephew, Francisco de Montejo "el Sobrino", to head the conquest of the eastern Yucatán, which was achieved after many bloody battles, ending with the foundation of the city of Valladolid on May 28, 1543.

=== Canek rebellion, during the colonial Yucatán ===
Oppressive policies of inequality and prejudice were imposed on the native Maya by the Spanish colonial government. In November 1761, Jacinto Canek, a Maya from the town of Cisteil (now located in Yaxcabá Municipality), led an armed uprising against the government, which was quickly put down. Captured insurgents were taken to Mérida, where they were tried and tortured. As a warning to the population against rebellion, Cisteil was burned and covered with salt.

This abortive rebellion was not of great consequence to the colonial regime, but it marked the history of the peninsula and clearly delineated anti-colonial tensions in the region. The uprising was a precursor to the social upheaval that would explode less than a century later, as the Caste War. The Canek rebellion is remembered today as a symbol of the racial and social conflict that predominated for centuries in the Spanish colonies.

=== Yucatán in independent Mexico ===
Yucatán in Mexico, 1824

Because of its geographical remoteness from the center of New Spain, especially from Mexico City, Yucatán was not militarily affected by the Mexican War of Independence, though the influence was felt in other ways. In 1820 Lorenzo de Zavala, member of Sanjuanistas (a group of creoles who met at the church of San Juan in downtown Mérida), created the Patriotic Confederation, which eventually divided into two groups: the supporters of the Spanish government under the Cádiz Constitution and another led by Zavala, which sought outright independence from Spain. Mariano Carrillo Albornoz then Governor of Yucatán, sent Zavala and Manuel García Sosa as deputies of the Cortes of Cádiz to Madrid, while the other liberals were imprisoned. While this was happening in Yucatán, the Plan of Iguala was proclaimed in the current state of Guerrero (at that time part of the Intendency of Mexico).

On September 15, 1821, in the Hall of Councils of the City of Mérida, Yucatán declared its independence from Spain. Almost immediately, Governor Juan María Echeverri sent two representatives to negotiate the incorporation of Yucatán into the Mexican Empire. The incorporation took place on November 2, 1821.

==== Republic of Yucatán ====
The Mexican Empire was quickly overthrown (1823) under the Plan of Casa Mata, and the provinces of the erstwhile empire became independent states. The first Republic of Yucatán, declared on May 29, 1823, joined the Federal Republic of the United Mexican States as the Federated Republic of Yucatán on December 23, 1823.

The second Republic of Yucatán (Note: Usually when historians talk about of the Republic of Yucatán, they are talking about the second republic.) emerged when the federal pact signed by Yucatán and endorsed in the Constitution of Yucatán of 1825 was broken by the centralist government of Mexico from 1835. In 1841 the state of Tabasco decreed its separation from Mexico and Miguel Barbachano, then governor of Yucatán, sent a commission headed by Justo Sierra O'Reilly to meet with Tabasco authorities to propose the creation of an independent federal republic from Mexico formed by the two states. The idea failed when Tabasco rejoined Mexico in 1842.

On August 22, 1846, Mexican interim president José Mariano Salas restored the 1824 constitution and federalism. Two years later, during the government of president José Joaquín de Herrera, Miguel Barbachano ordered the reinstatement of Yucatán to Mexico under the Constitution of Yucatán of 1825. A decisive factor for the reinstatement was the Caste War, which forced Yucatán to seek outside help. In 1852 due to internal struggles between opposing political factions, the Territory of Campeche was created. On April 29, 1863, during the government of Mexican President Benito Juárez, Campeche gained its current status as an independent state.

==== Flag of the Republic of Yucatán ====
The flag of Yucatán was raised on March 16, 1841. The period of the Republic of Yucatán was the only one in which the banner was officially used by the authorities of Yucatán.

Rodolfo Menéndez de la Peña, historian, describes the flag of Yucatán: "The flag of Yucatán was divided into two parts: green on left, the right, with three divisions, red up and down and white in the middle. In the green field highlighted, five stars, symbolizing the five departments that Yucatan was divided by decree of November 30, 1840: Mérida, Izamal, Valladolid, Tekax and Campeche."

The flag did not have official recognition in the state however, it maintained a strong recognition among the people of the state.

==== Caste War ====
The Caste War of Yucatán was a conflict that lasted from 1847 to 1901. It began with the revolt of native Maya people led by Maya chiefs Jacinto Pat and Cecilio Chi, against the population of European descent called "Yucatecos", who had political and economic control. A lengthy war ensued between the Yucateco forces in the north-west of the Yucatán and the independent Maya in the south-east. It officially ended with the occupation of the Maya capital of Chan Santa Cruz by the Mexican army in 1901, although skirmishes with villages and small settlements that refused to acknowledge Mexican control continued for over another decade.

Adam Jones wrote: "This ferocious race war featured genocidal atrocities on both sides, with up to 200,000 killed."

Because of the conflict, on November 24, 1902, Yucatán had a second territorial division when Porfirio Díaz decreed the creation of the Federal Territory of Quintana Roo, with capital in the port of Payo Obispo (today Chetumal). In little more than half a century, Yucatán lost more than two thirds of its original territory.

==== The henequen industry ====
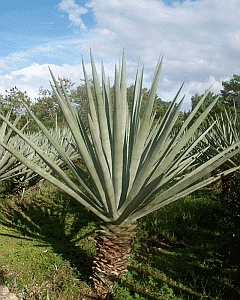
Agave fourcroydes, commonly known as henequén in Yucatán, sisal elsewhere and ki in Maya language

In the late 19th century, the henequen industry grew to unprecedented power in the Yucatan. The henequen grown in the Yucatan was used around the world for rope and twine, and became known as sisal rope, named after the seaside town of Sisal, from where the rope was shipped. Today Sisal is a sleepy fishing village, being rediscovered by locals and visitors as a beach location for vacation homes. The henequen industry provided financial autonomy to the isolated Yucatán. The fiber of the henequén plant (known as sosquil (maya: sos kí)) was manufactured into twine and rope, used in riggings, string, sacks, rugs, and many other items. It became the chief export item of the Yucatán, making many local families very wealthy. That wealth is today evident in the architecture of the colonial city of Mérida, as well as in the more than 150 haciendas that are spread throughout the Yucatán Peninsula.

Korean immigration to Mexico began in 1905. The first Korean migrants settled in Yucatán as workers in henequen plantations. Labour brokers began advertising in newspapers in the Korean port city of Incheon in 1904 for workers willing to go to Mexico to work on henequen plantations for four- or five-year contracts. A total of more than one thousand were recruited and departed from Incheon on board a British cargo ship on 4 April 1905, despite efforts by the Korean government to block their departure. Once their contracts were up, most settled in Mexico, either continuing to work on henequen plantations or moving to various cities in the country.

Hundreds of prosperous haciendas abounded in the state until the advent of synthetic products after World War II, the cultivation of henequén in other parts of the world and the self-serving actions of some of the leading henequen-growing families led to the gradual decline of the Yucatan's monopoly on the industry.

The great influx of wealth during that period from the henequen industry focused mainly on Mérida, the capital of Yucatán State. It allowed the city of Mérida to install street lights and a tram system even before Mexico City. It is said that in the early 20th century, the city had the largest number of millionaires per capita in the world. Today, Paseo de Montejo (inspired by the Parisian avenue Champs-Élysées), is lined with the elegant houses built during that time. These houses are mostly now renovated and serve as everything from private homes to banks, hotels and restaurants. Many of the haciendas today have also been renovated and now serve as private homes, event venues and upscale luxury hotels.

=== Late 20th century ===
Until the mid-20th century most of Yucatán's contact with the outside world was by sea; trade with the US and Cuba, as well as Europe and other Caribbean islands, was more significant than that with the rest of Mexico. In the 1950s Yucatán was linked to the rest of Mexico by railway, followed by highway in the 1960s, ending the region's comparative isolation. Today Yucatán still demonstrates a unique culture from the rest of Mexico, including its own style of food.

Commercial jet airplanes began arriving in Mérida in the 1960s, and additional international airports were built first in Cozumel and then in the new planned resort community of Cancún in the 1980s, making tourism a major force in the economy of the Yucatán Peninsula.

The first Maya governor of Yucatán, Francisco Luna Kan, was elected in 1976.

Today, the Yucatán Peninsula is a major tourism destination, as well as home to one of the largest indigenous populations in Mexico, the Maya people.

== Geography ==
The State of Yucatán is located on the Yucatán Peninsula. It borders the states of Campeche to the southwest, Quintana Roo to the east and southeast, and the Gulf of Mexico to the north and west. As a whole, the state is extremely flat with little or no topographic variation, with the exception of the Puuc hills, located in the southern portion of the state.

Flora and fauna of Yucatán

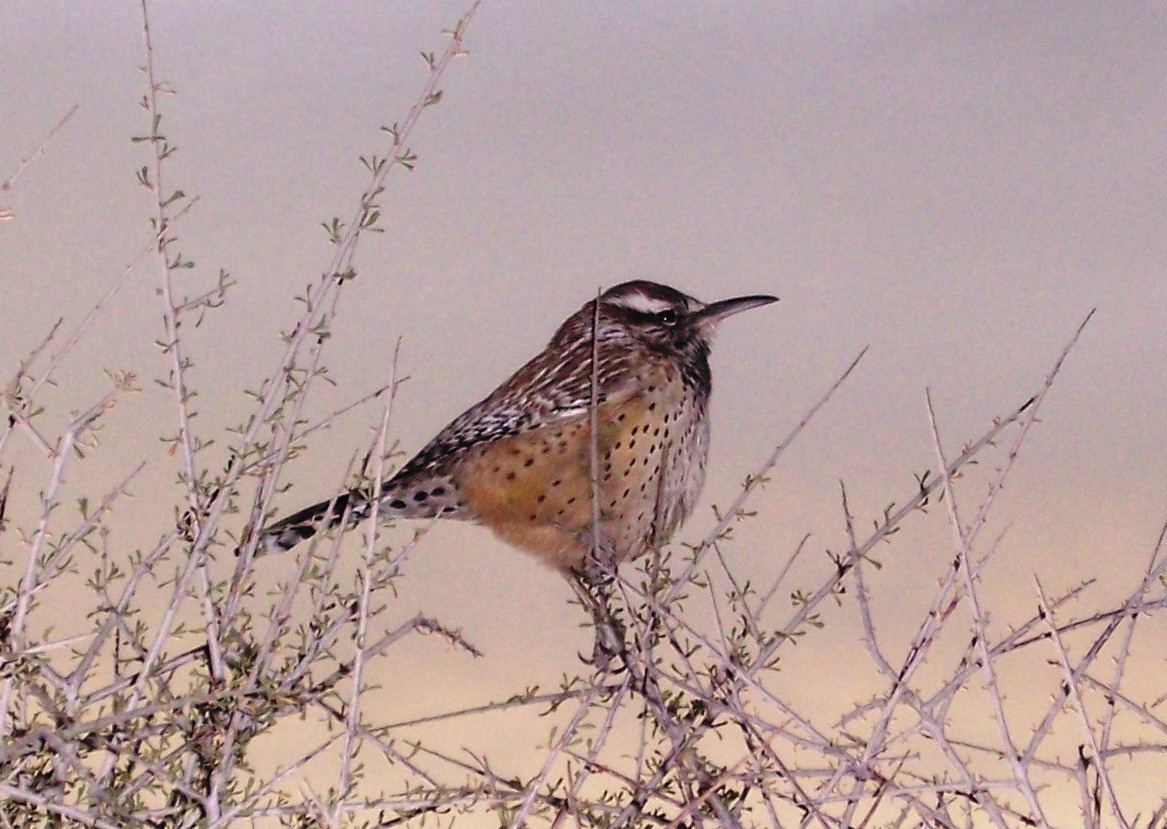
Yucatan wren

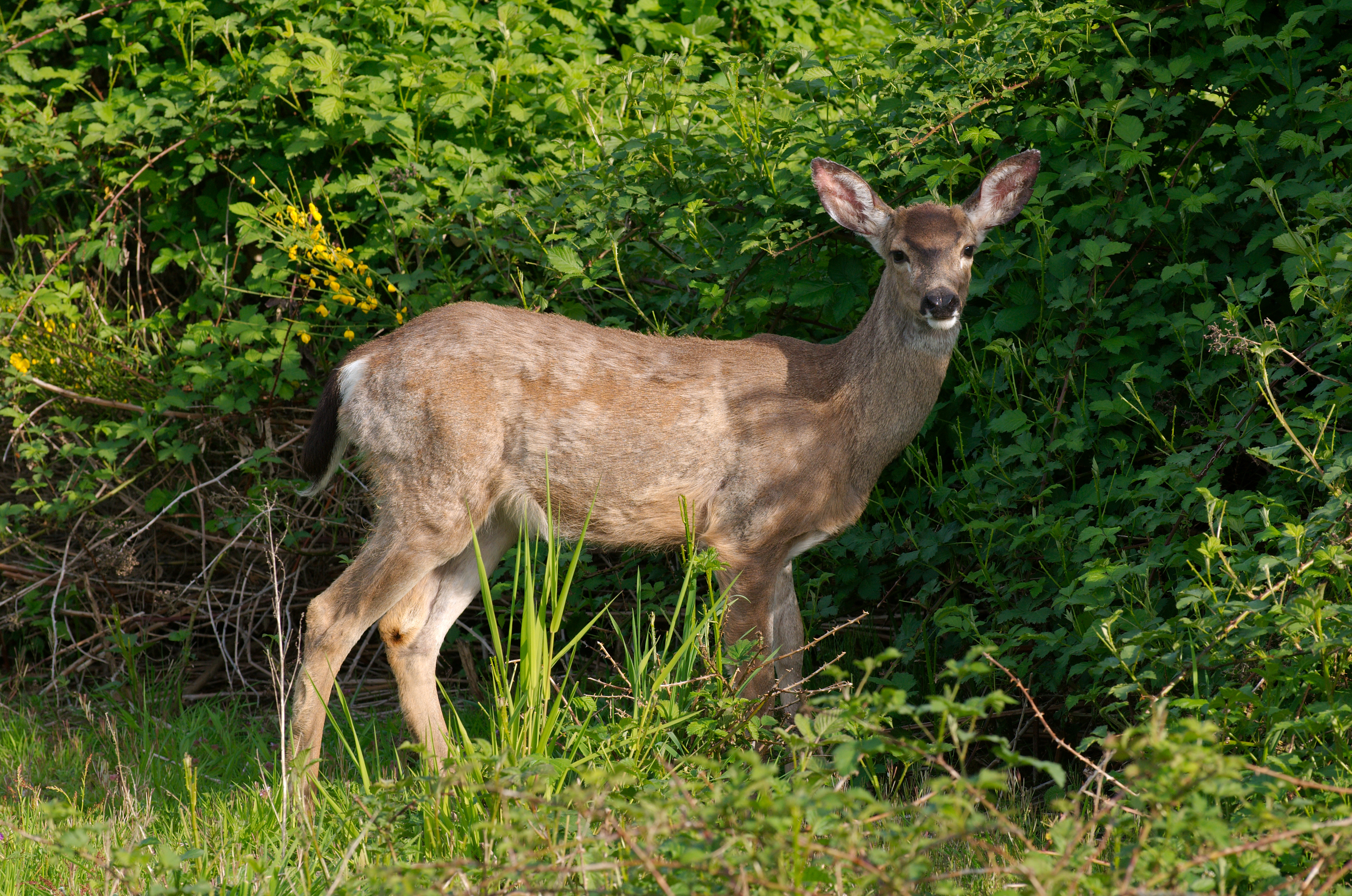
White-tailed deer

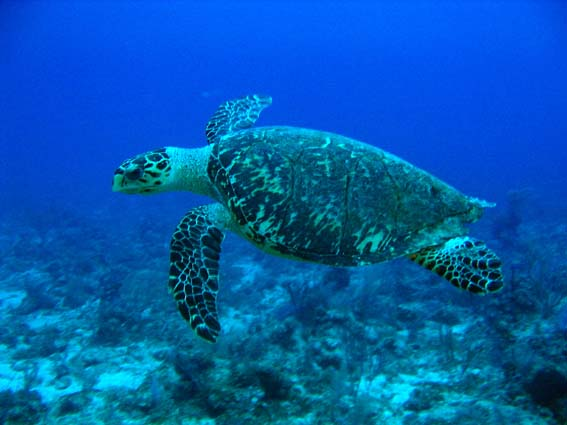
Hawksbill sea turtle

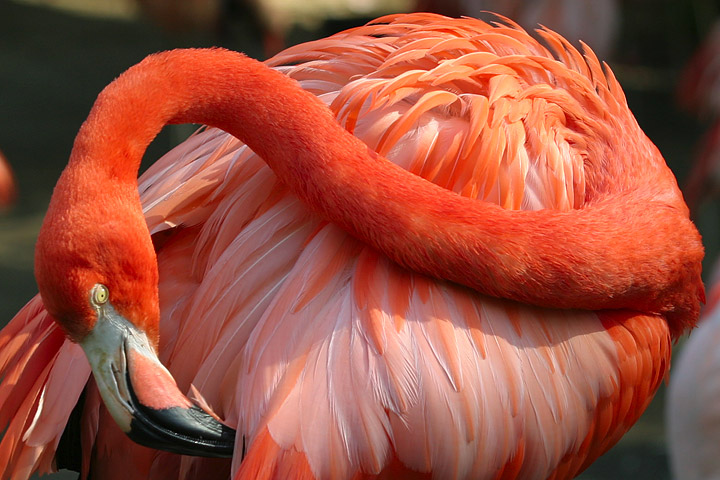
American flamingo

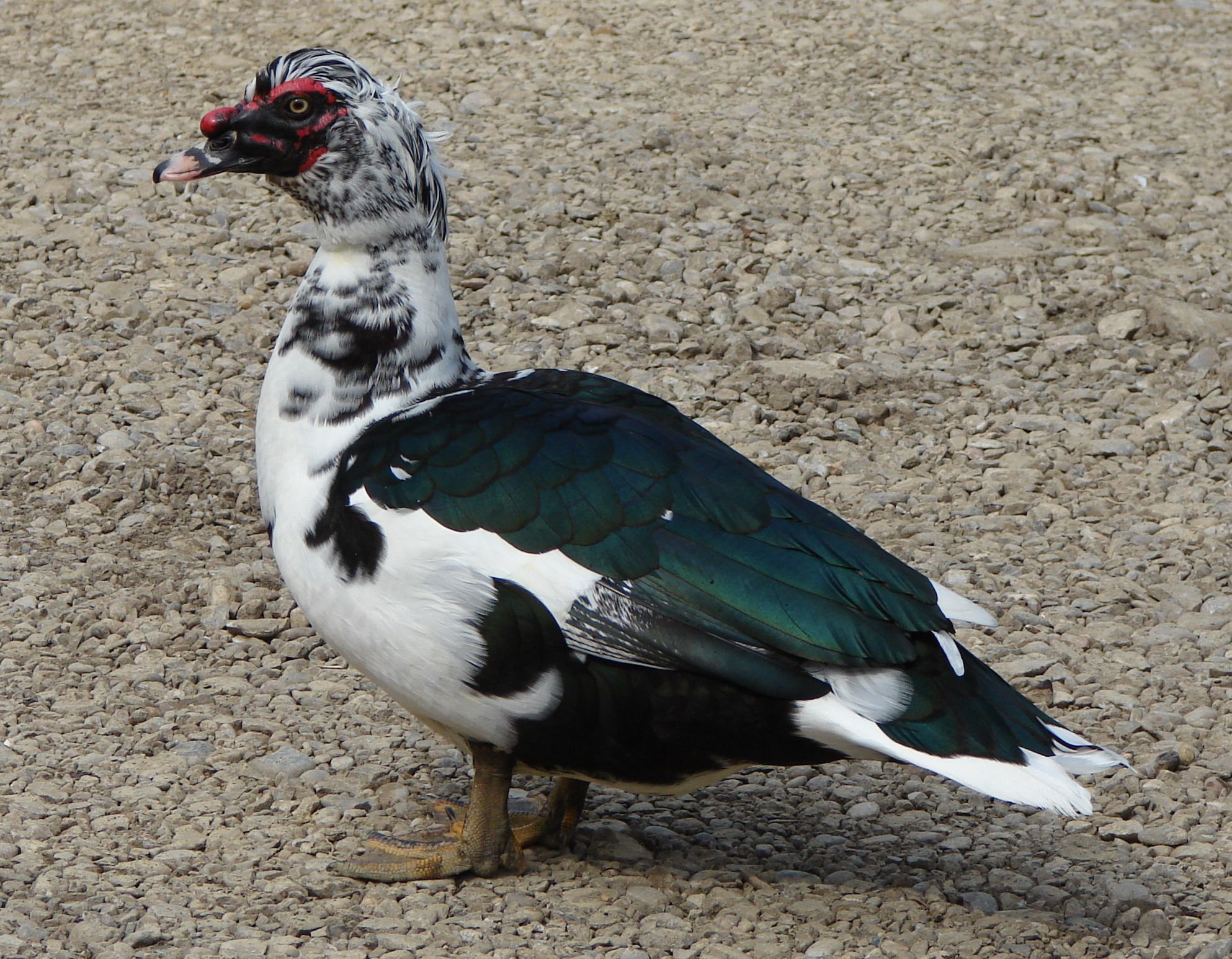
Muscovy duck

Jaguar

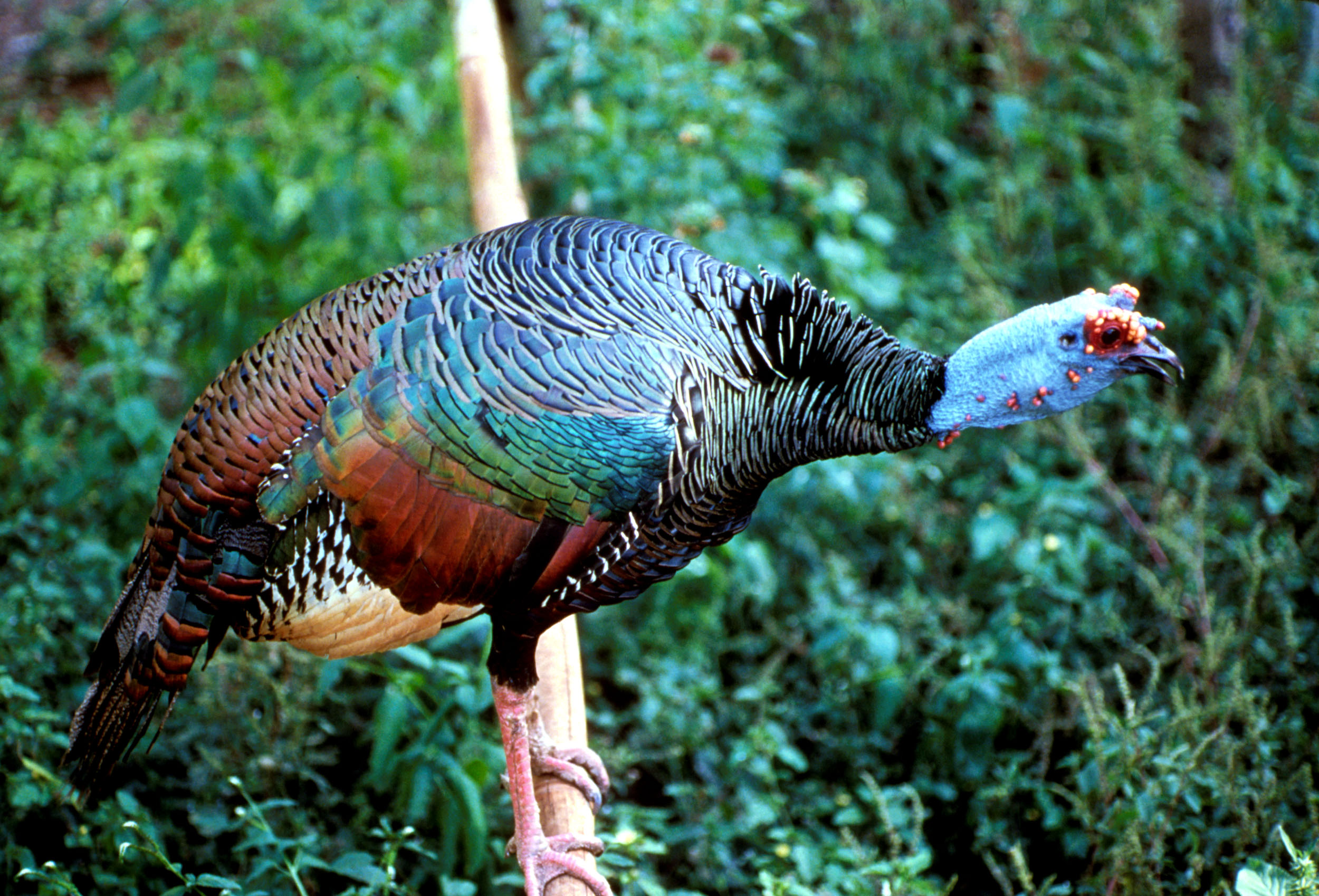
Ocellated turkey

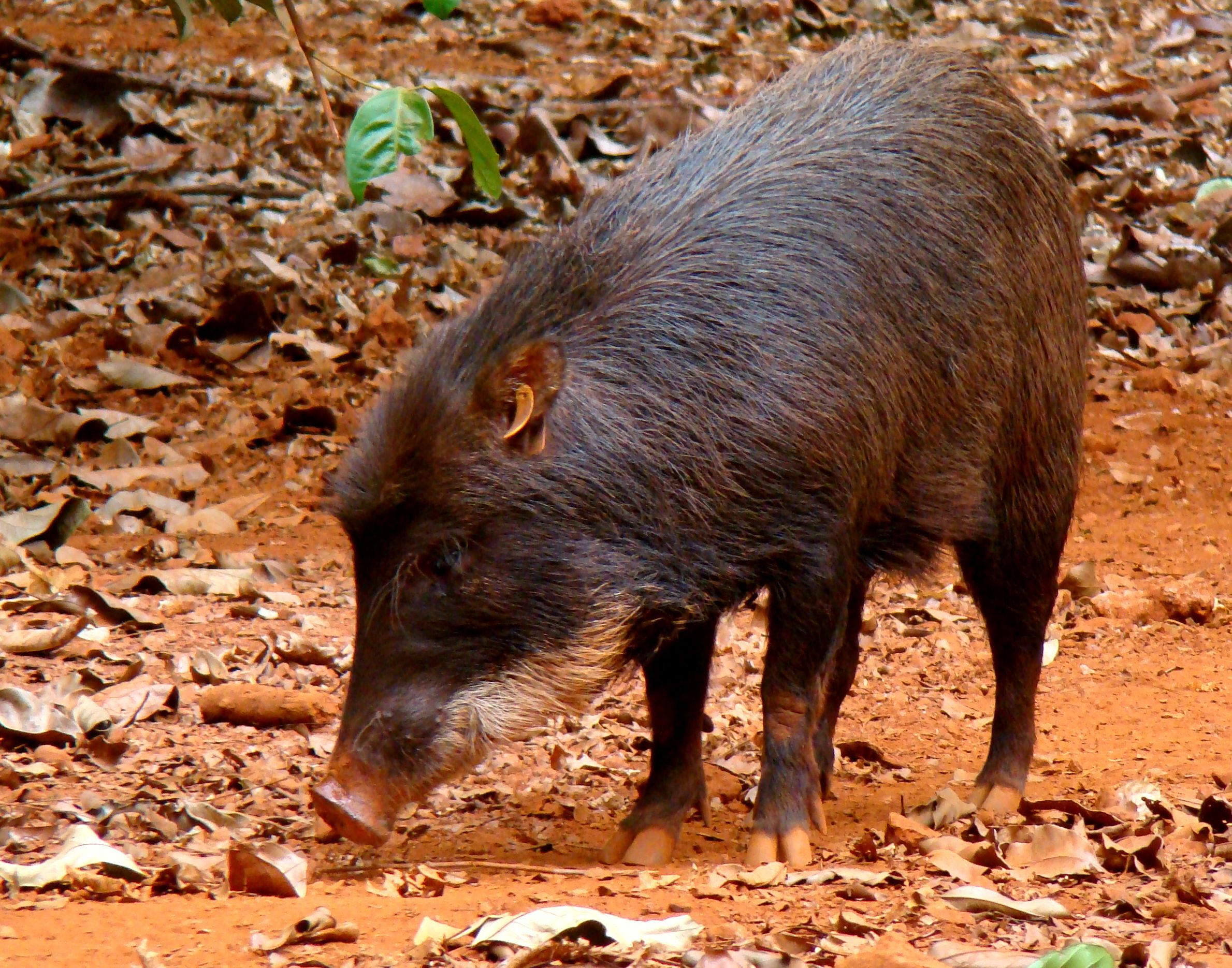
White-lipped peccary

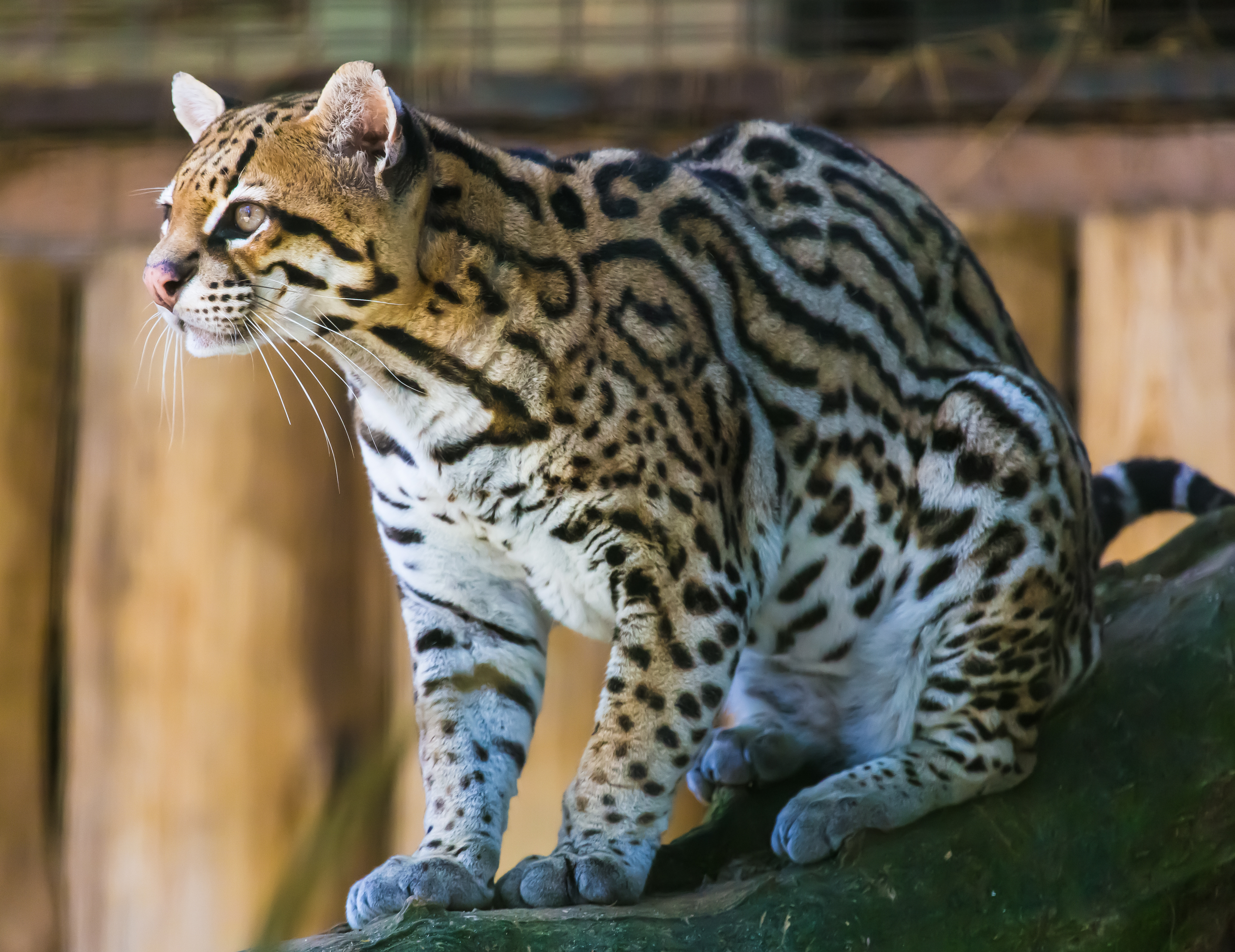
Ocelot

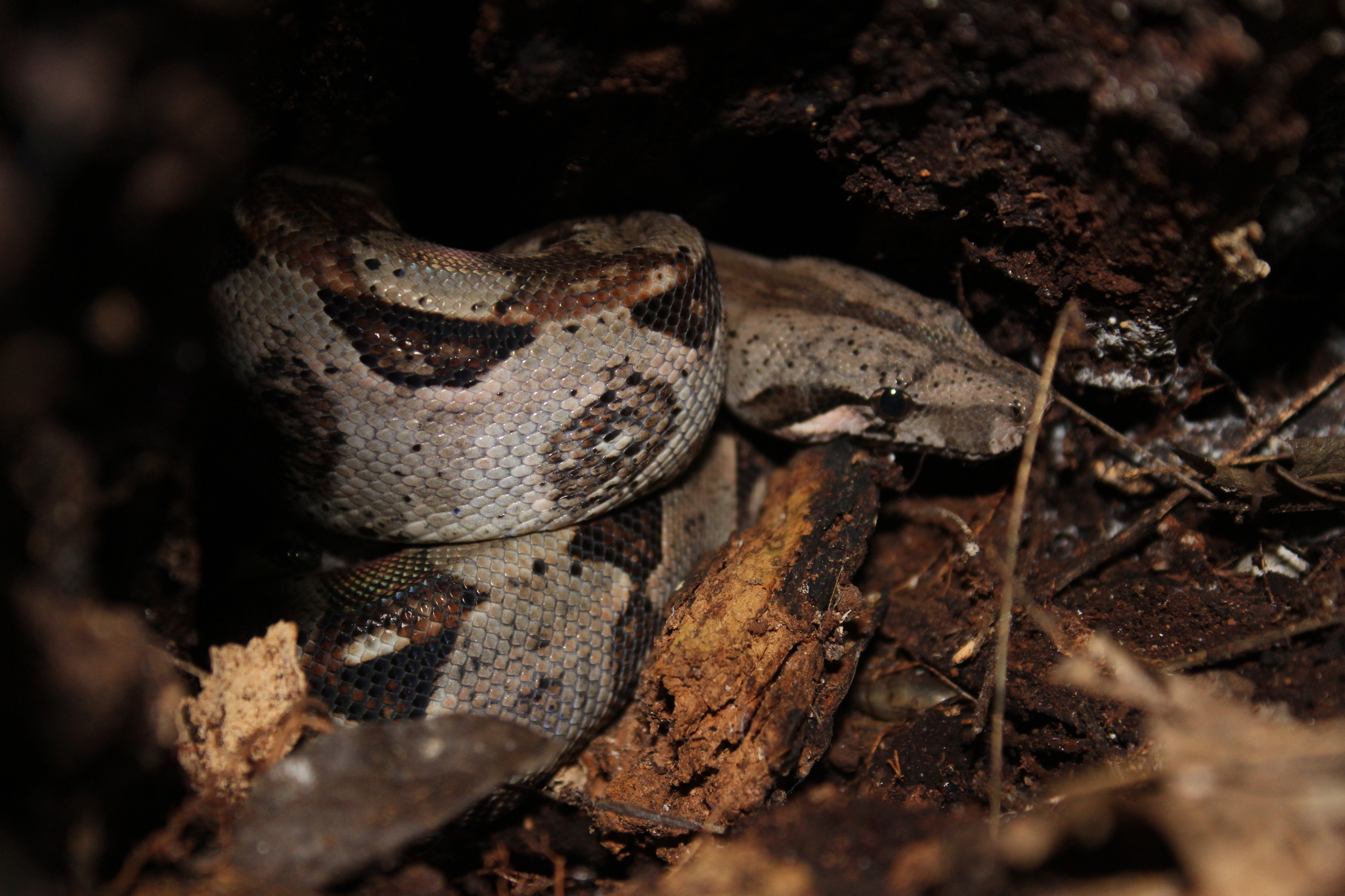
Boa imperator

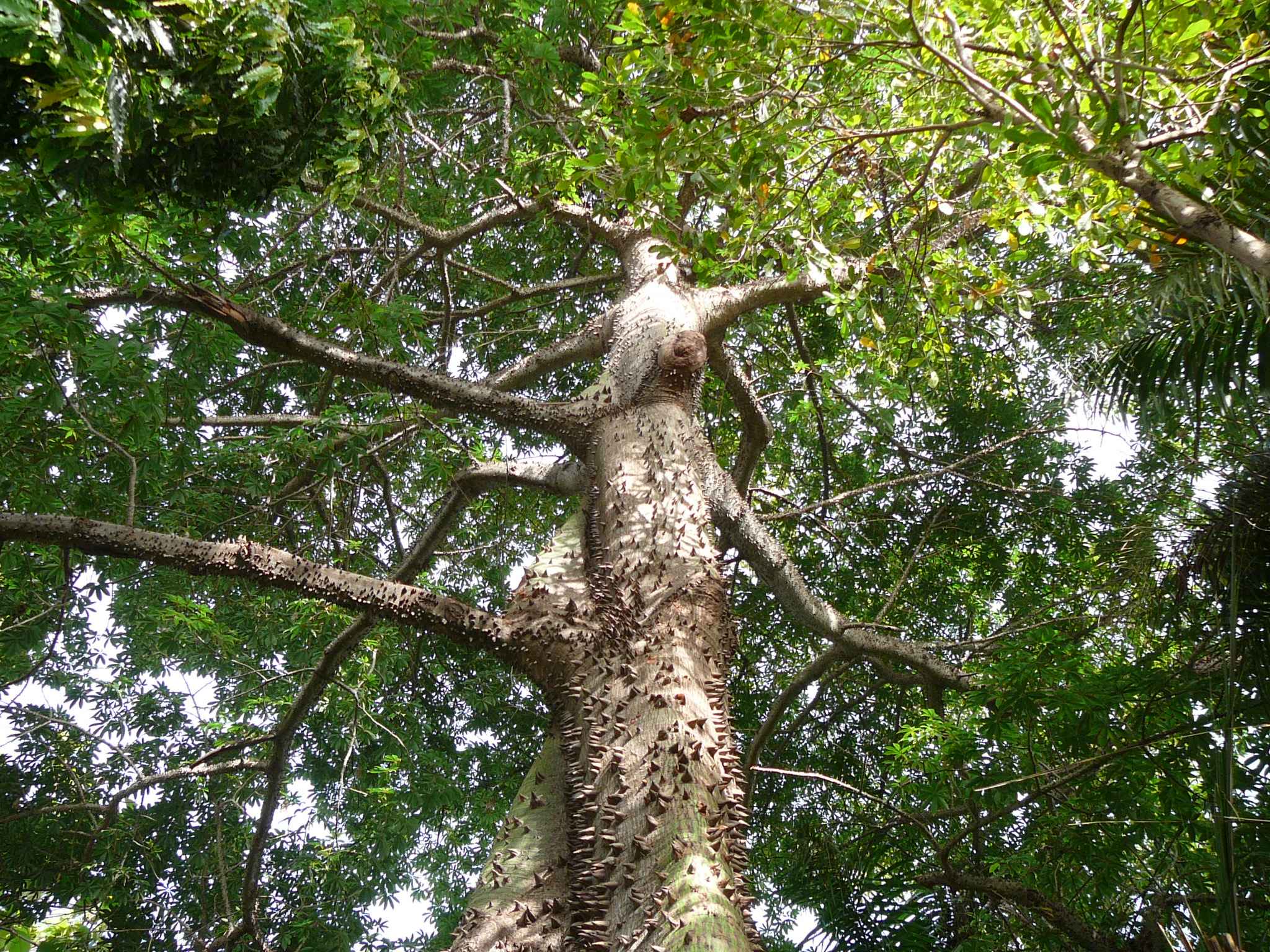
Ceiba pentandra

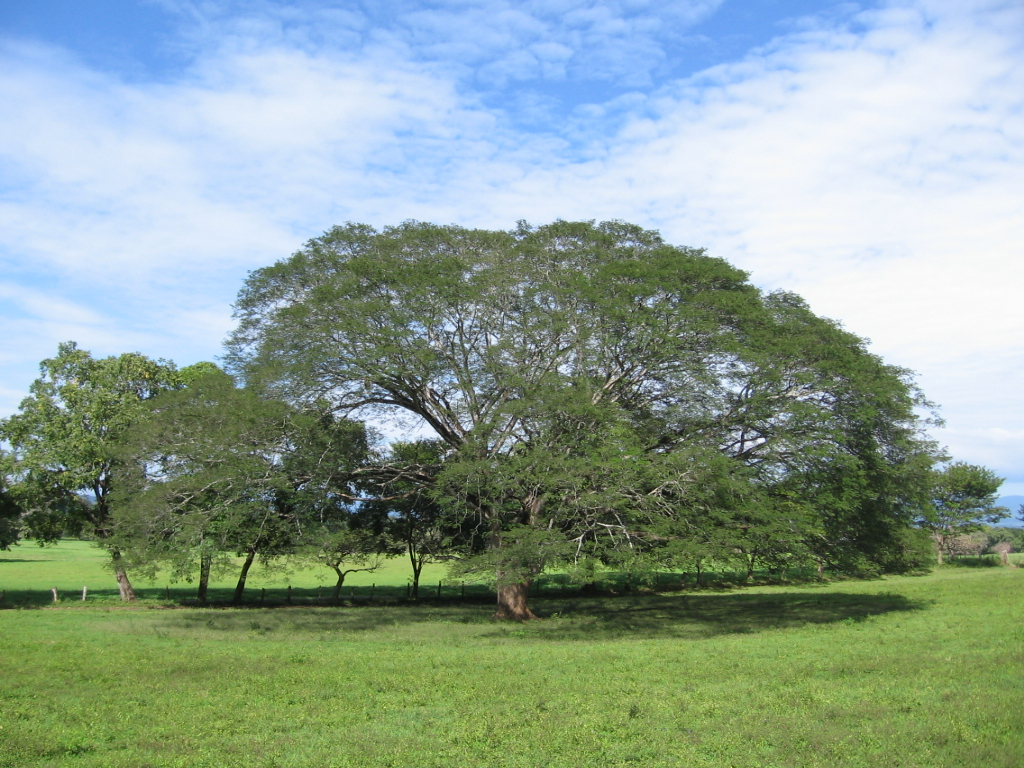
Enterolobium cyclocarpum

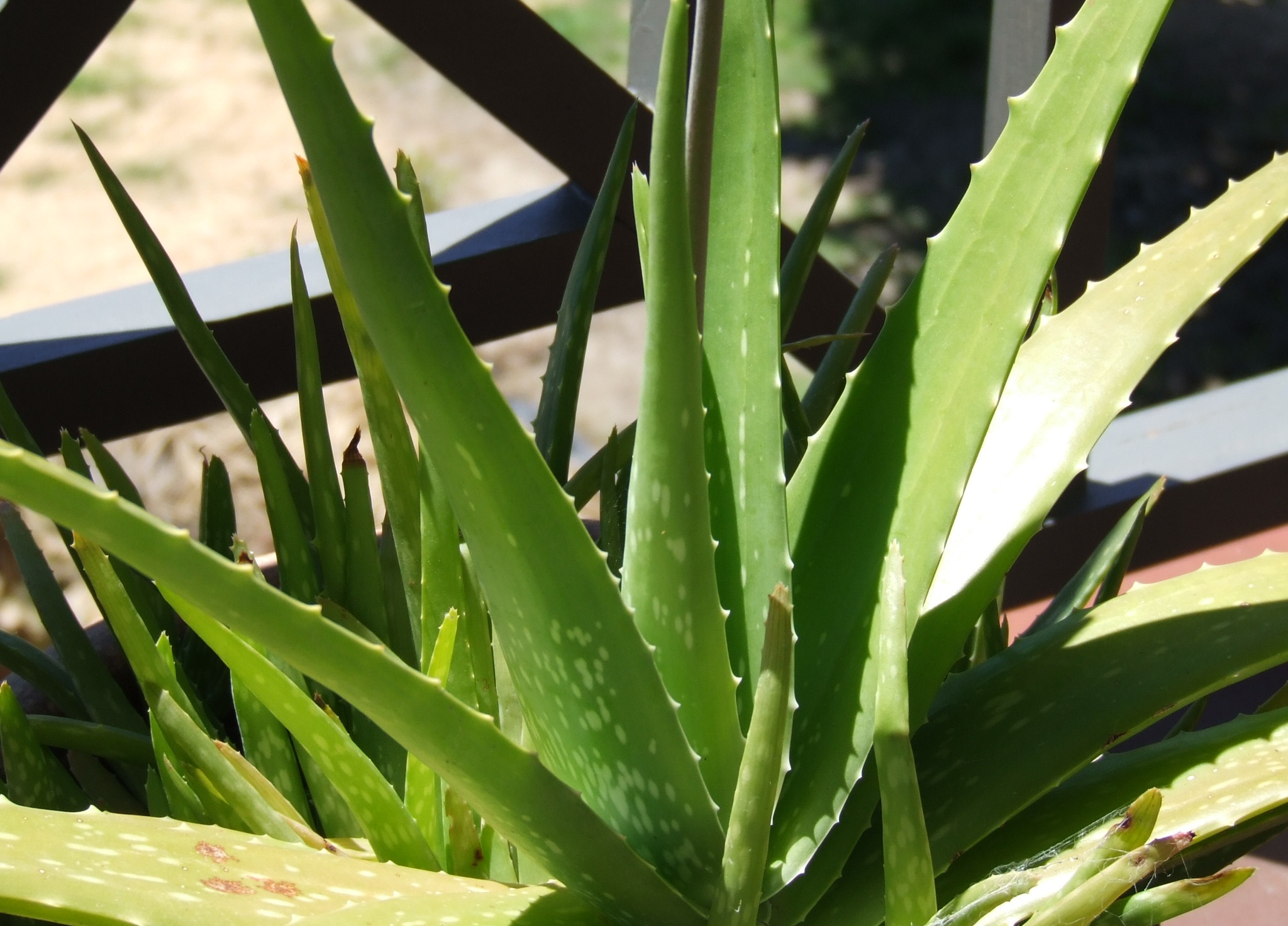
Aloe vera

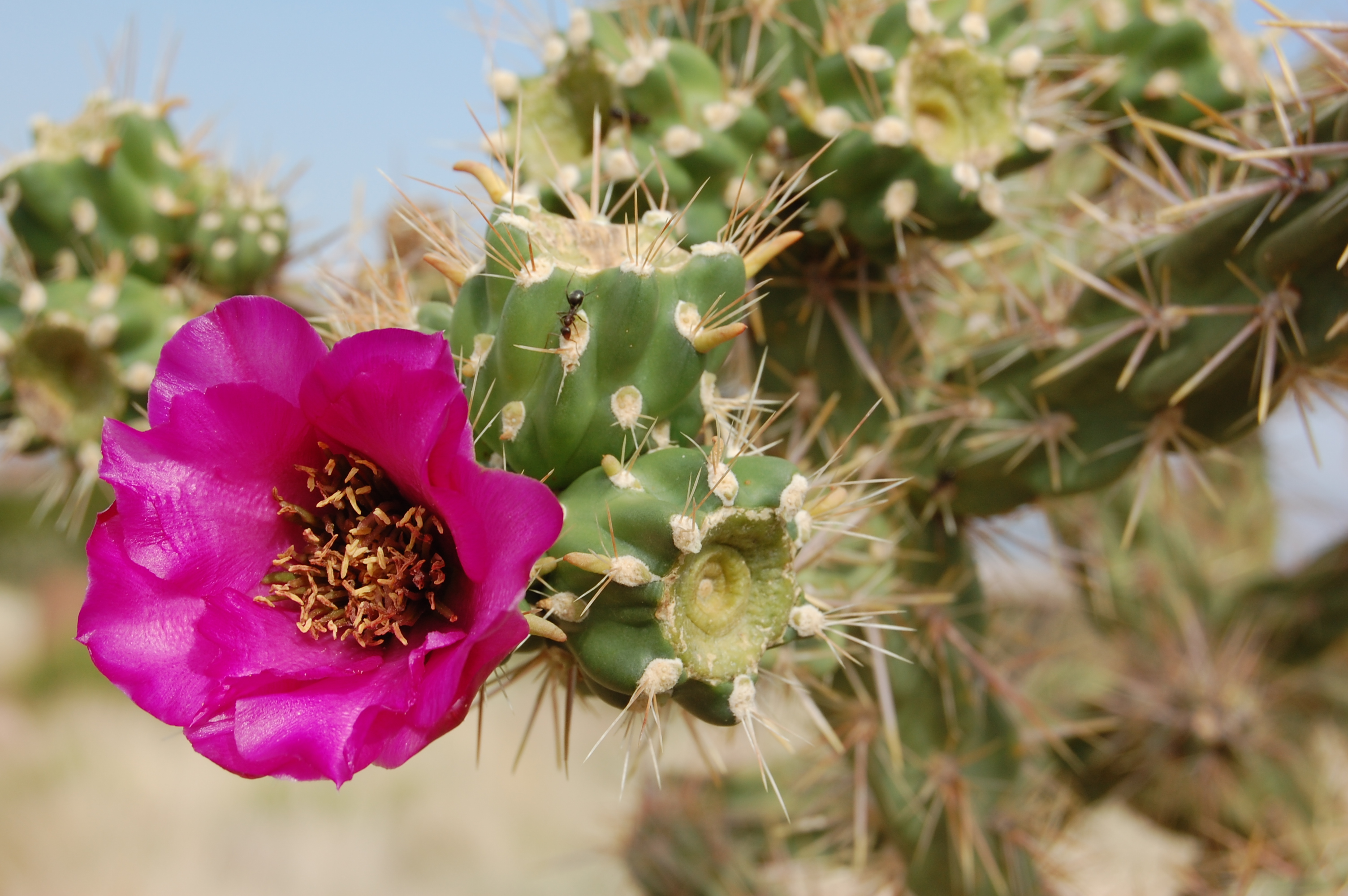
Cylindropuntia imbricata

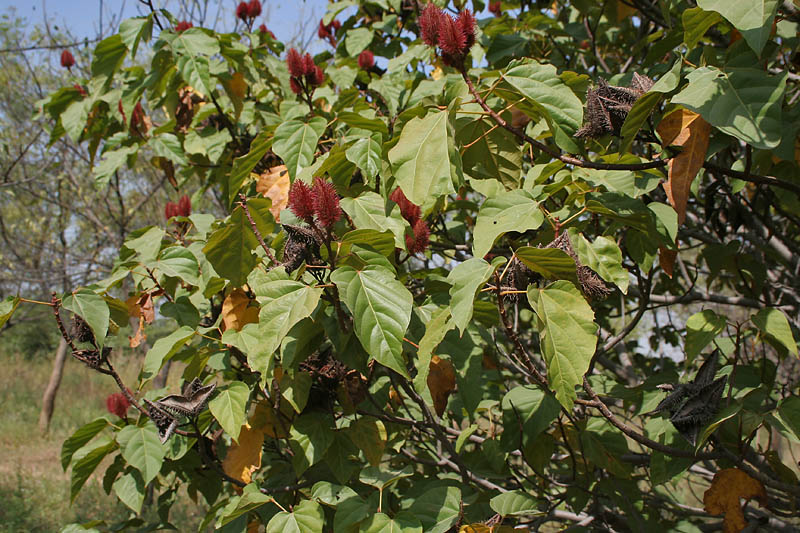
Bixa orellana

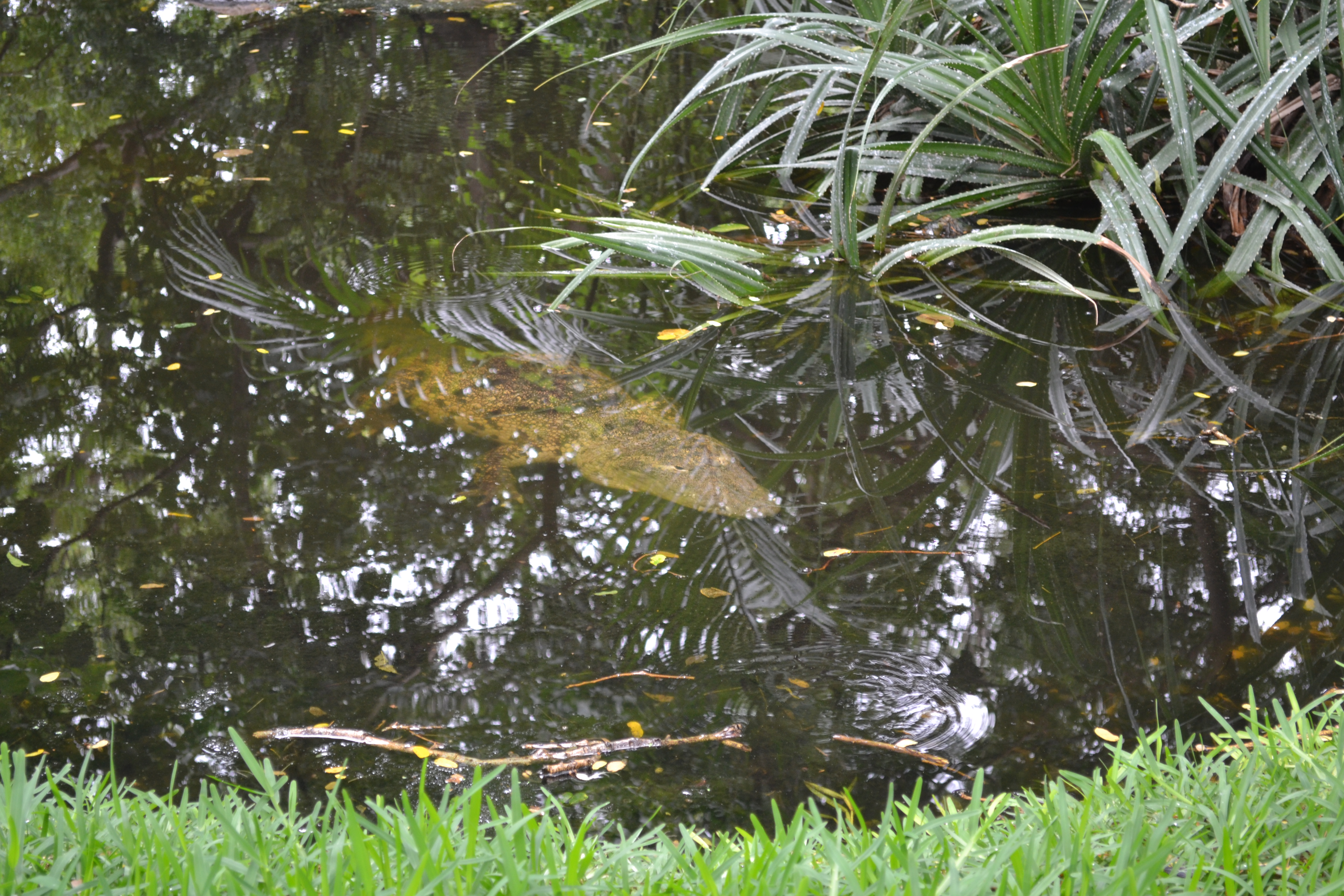
Morelet's crocodile

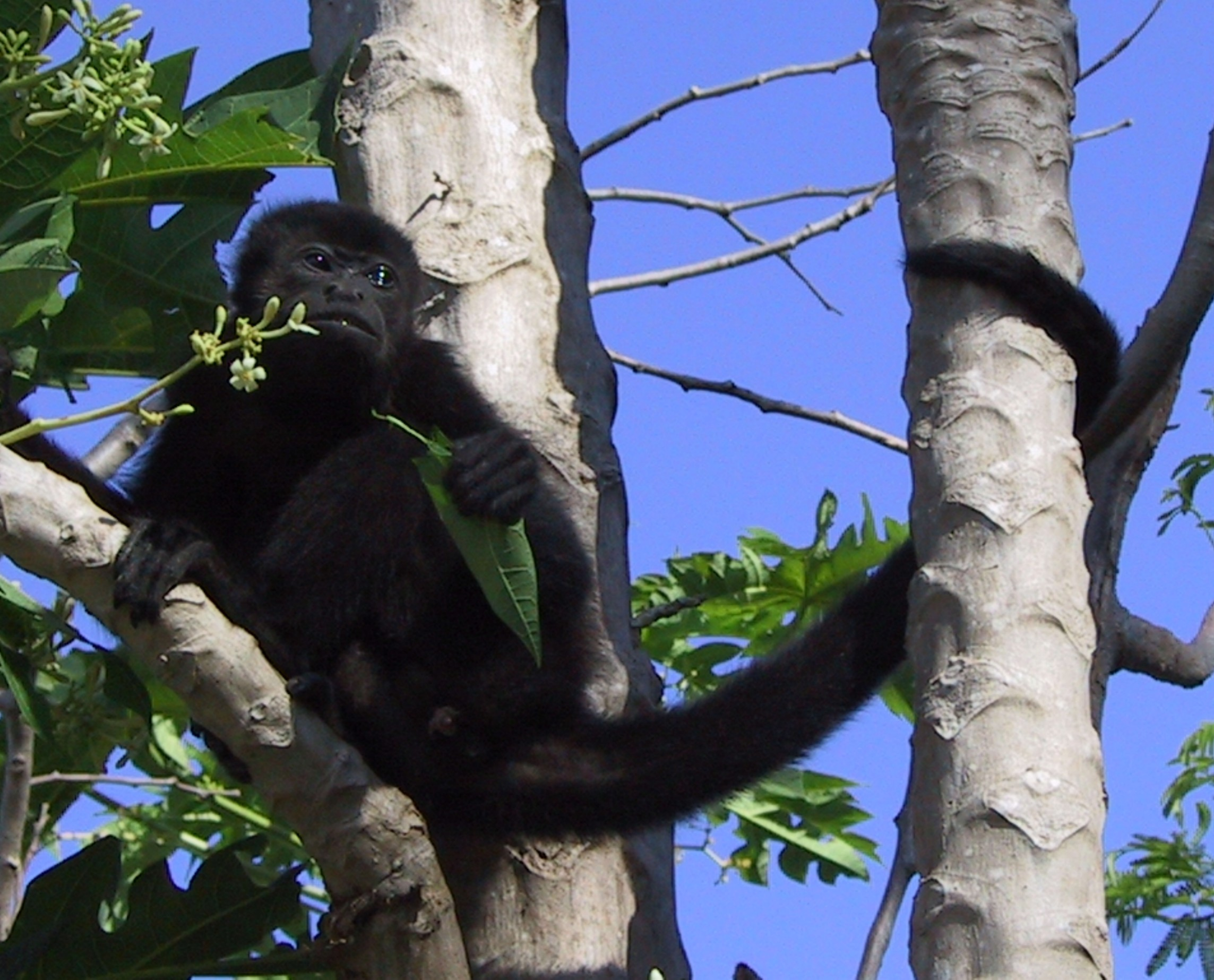
Guatemalan black howler

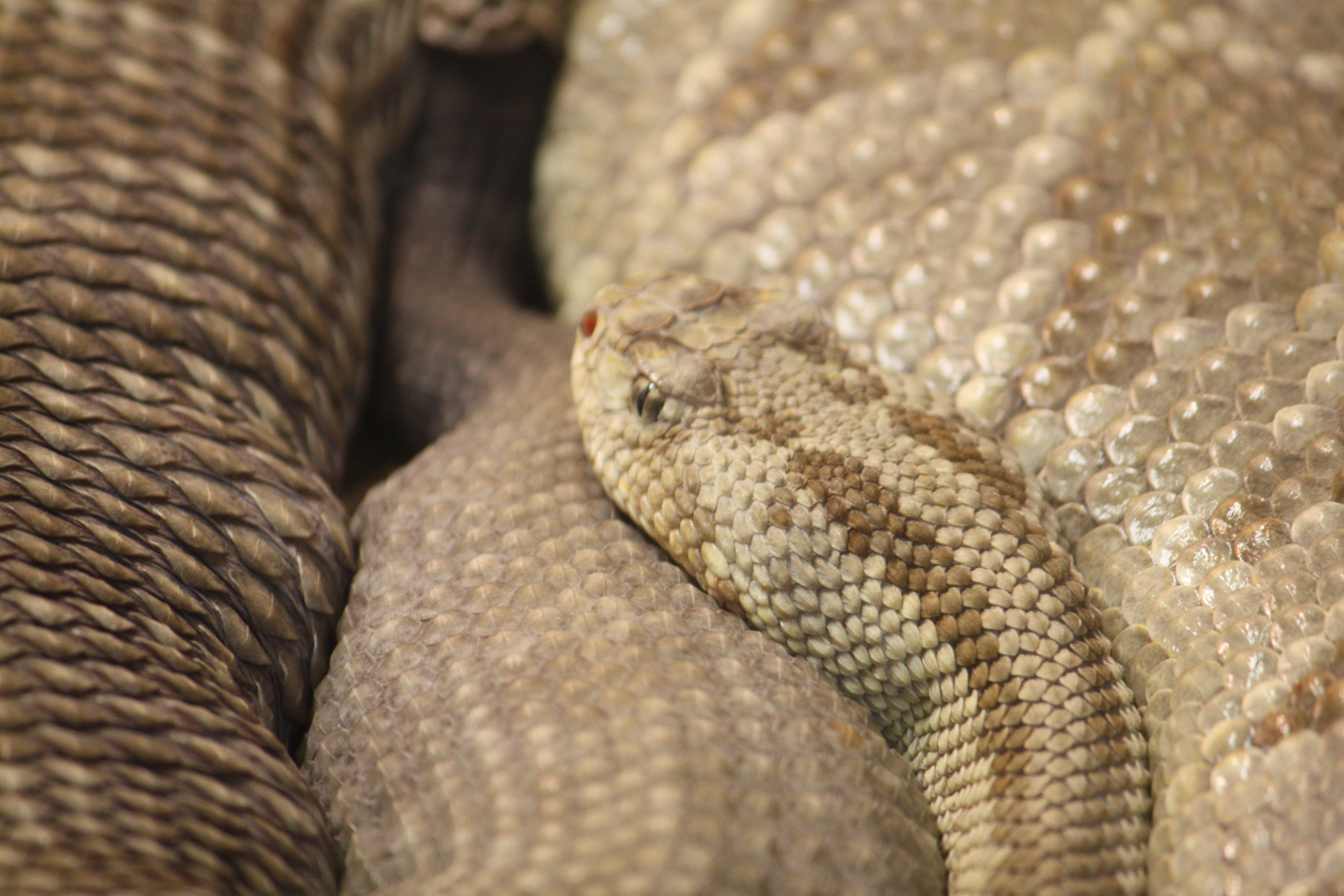
Crotalus simus

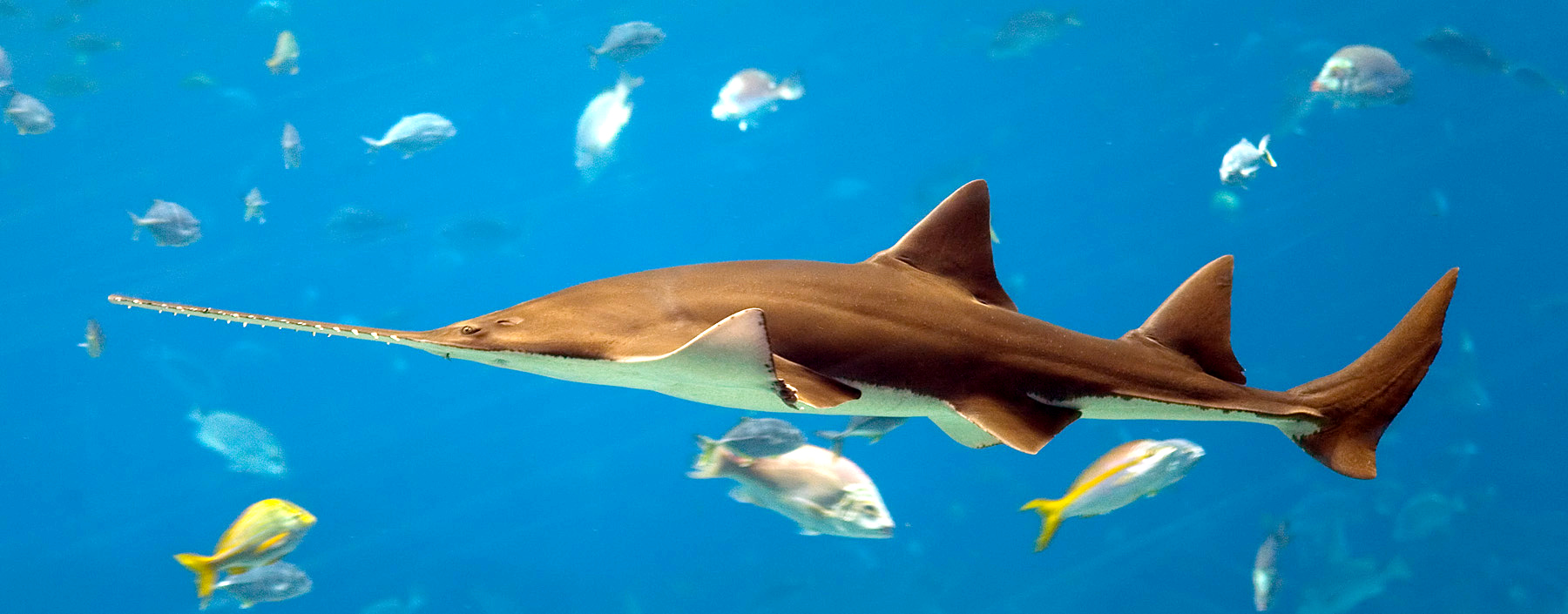
Smalltooth sawfish

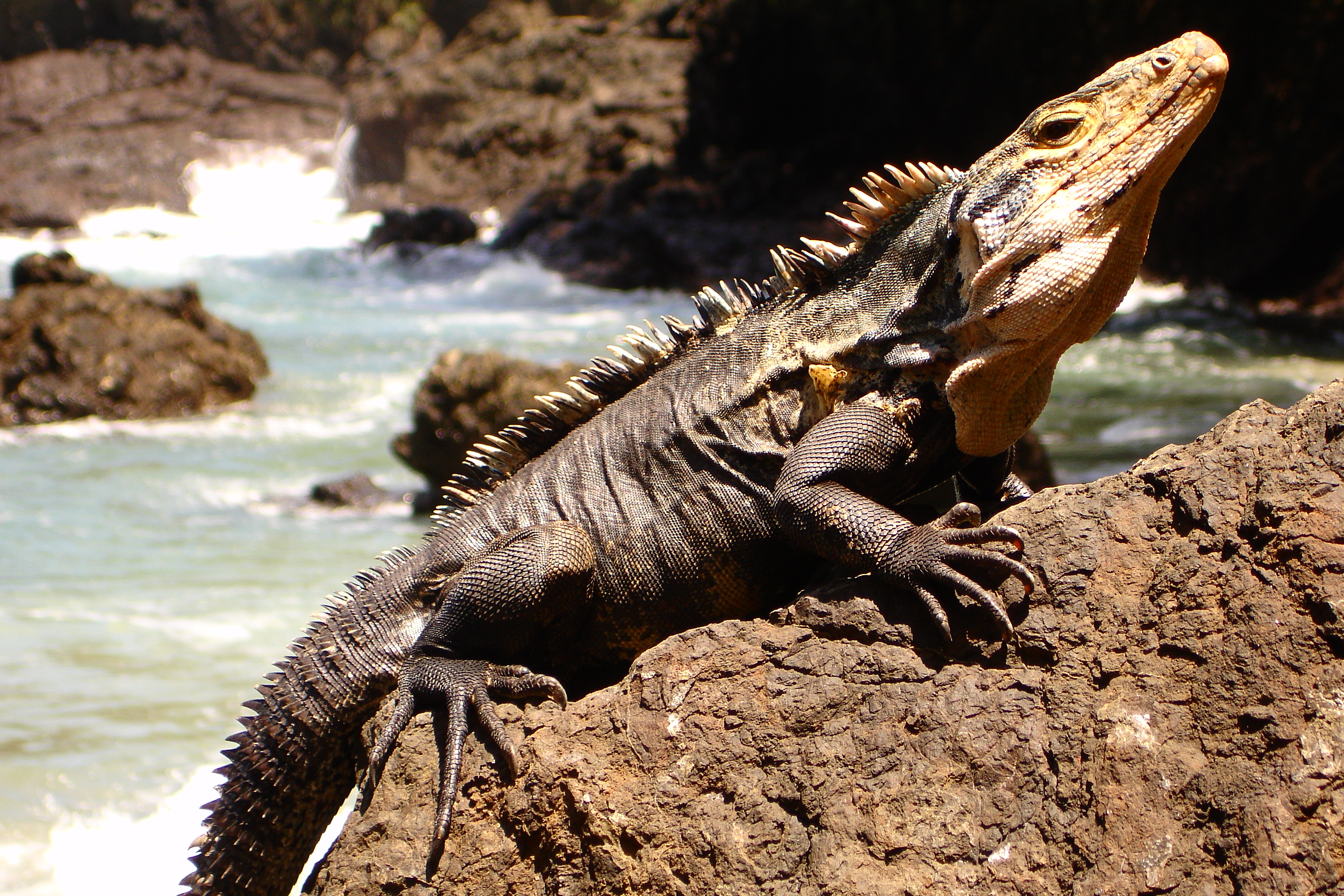
Ctenosaura similis

== Demography ==
=== Largest cities ===
Largest cities or towns in Yucatán Source:
Rank		Municipality	Pop.
1	Mérida	Mérida	921,771
2	Kanasín	Kanasín	139,753
3	Valladolid	Valladolid	56,494
4	Umán	Umán	56,409
5	Tizimín	Tizimín	52,593
6	Progreso	Progreso	41,965
7	Ticul	Ticul	35,183
8	Tekax de Álvaro Obregón	Tekax	28,461
9	Hunucmá	Hunucmá	28,412
10	Oxkutzcab	Oxkutzcab	26,175

Historical population
Year	Pop.	±%
1895	298,569	—
1900	309,652	+3.7%
1910	339,613	+9.7%
1921	358,221	+5.5%
1930	386,096	+7.8%
1940	418,210	+8.3%
1950	516,899	+23.6%
1960	614,049	+18.8%
1970	758,355	+23.5%
1980	1,063,733	+40.3%
1990	1,362,940	+28.1%
1995	1,556,622	+14.2%
2000	1,658,210	+6.5%
2005	1,818,948	+9.7%
2010	1,955,577	+7.5%
2015	2,097,175	+7.2%
2020	2,320,898	+10.7%

=== Languages ===
A Yucatec Maya speaker

The most widespread indigenous language of Yucatán is Yucatec Maya, spoken natively by approximately 800,000 people in Yucatán and adjacent Quintana Roo and Campeche, especially in rural areas. The Spanish spoken in Yucatán has lexical and some phonological borrowing from Mayan and employs many words of Mayan origin, such as purux ("fat"), tuch ("navel") and wixar ("urinate").

=== Korean immigration ===
In 1905, 1,003 Korean immigrants – 802 men and 231 women and children – departed from the port of Chemulpo, Incheon, aboard the ship Ilford to Salina Cruz, Oaxaca. The journey took 45 days, after which they took a train to Coatzacoalcos, Veracruz. At Coatzacoalcos, another boat was taken to the port of Progreso, with the final destination being the city of Mérida. They arrived in May 1905, with previously signed contracts for four years' work as indentured laborers on the Yucatán henequen haciendas. Many of these Koreans were distributed throughout Yucatán in 32 henequen haciendas. The town of Motul, Yucatán, located in the heart of the henequen zone, was a destination for many of the Korean immigrants. Subsequently, in 1909, at the end of their contracts, they began a new stage in which they scattered even further. Thus, the majority of those who came were single men who made or remade their family lives with Yucatecan especially Maya women. While Korean girls were much more subject to marriages arranged by Korean parents, males had greater freedom when it came to making a family. This rapid intermarriage by Koreans, coupled with geographic dispersal, prevented the establishment of close social networks among these migrants and therefore provided the basis for Korean descendants across the Yucatán Peninsula. After that 1905 ship, no further entries of Koreans into Mexico were recorded until many years later, leading to a new community of Koreans with completely different characteristics from those who entered in 1905.

== Government and politics ==
=== Government ===
The Constitution of Yucatán provides that the government of Yucatán, like the government of every other state in Mexico, consists of three powers: the executive, the legislative and the judiciary.

Executive power rests in the governor of Yucatán, who is directly elected by the citizens, using a secret ballot, to a six-year term with no possibility of reelection. Legislative power rests in the Congress of Yucatán which is a unicameral legislature composed of 25 deputies. Judicial power is invested in the High Court of Justice of Yucatán and its district courts.

=== Municipalities ===
The State of Yucatán is divided into 106 municipalities, each headed by a municipal president (mayor). Usually municipalities are named after the city that serves as municipal seat; e.g. the municipal seat of the municipality of Mérida is the city of Mérida.

=== Politics ===
The 2024 local election in Yucatán was held on 2 June. Joaquín Díaz Mena was elected to succeed Mauricio Vila Dosal as governor.

Tourism in Yucatán

Chichen Itza

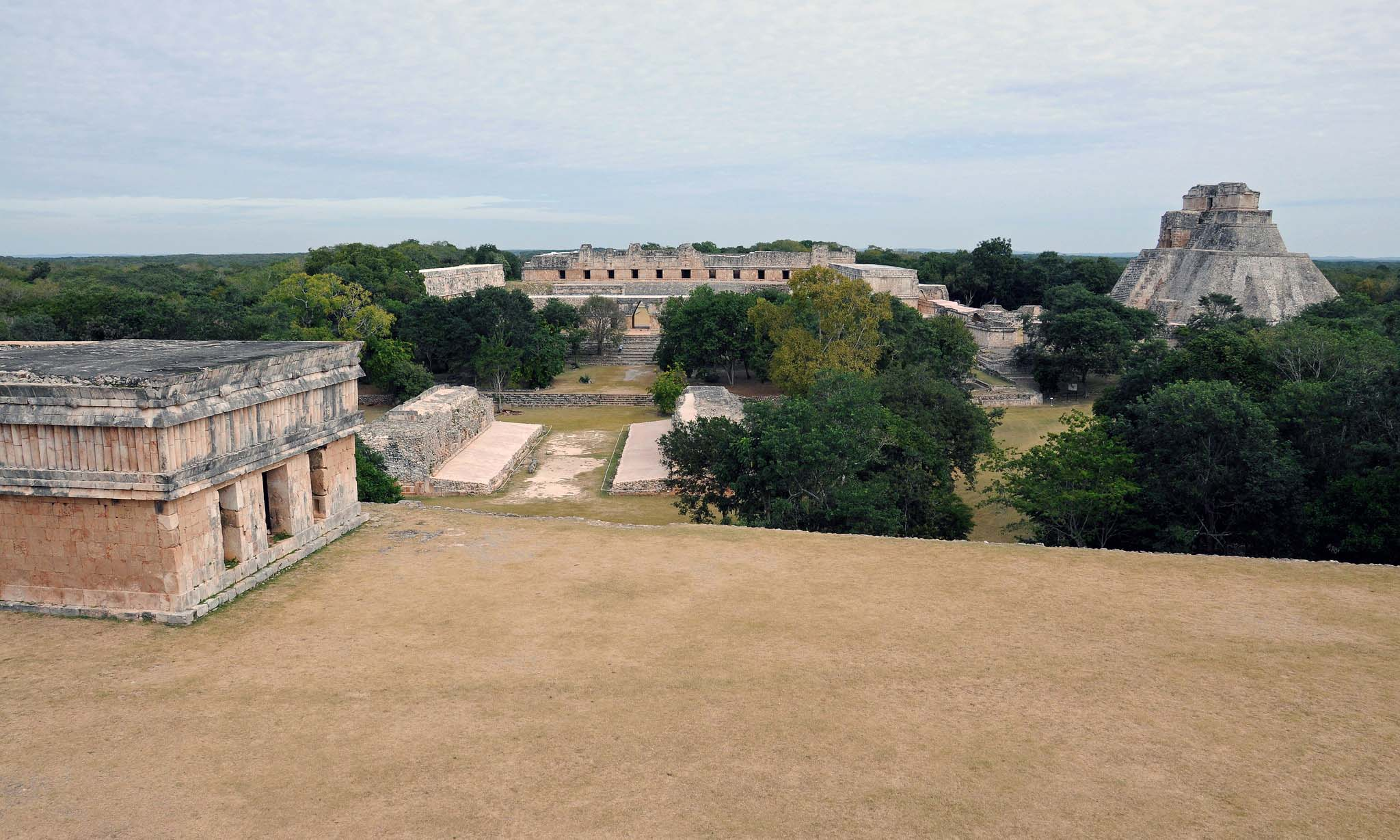
Uxmal

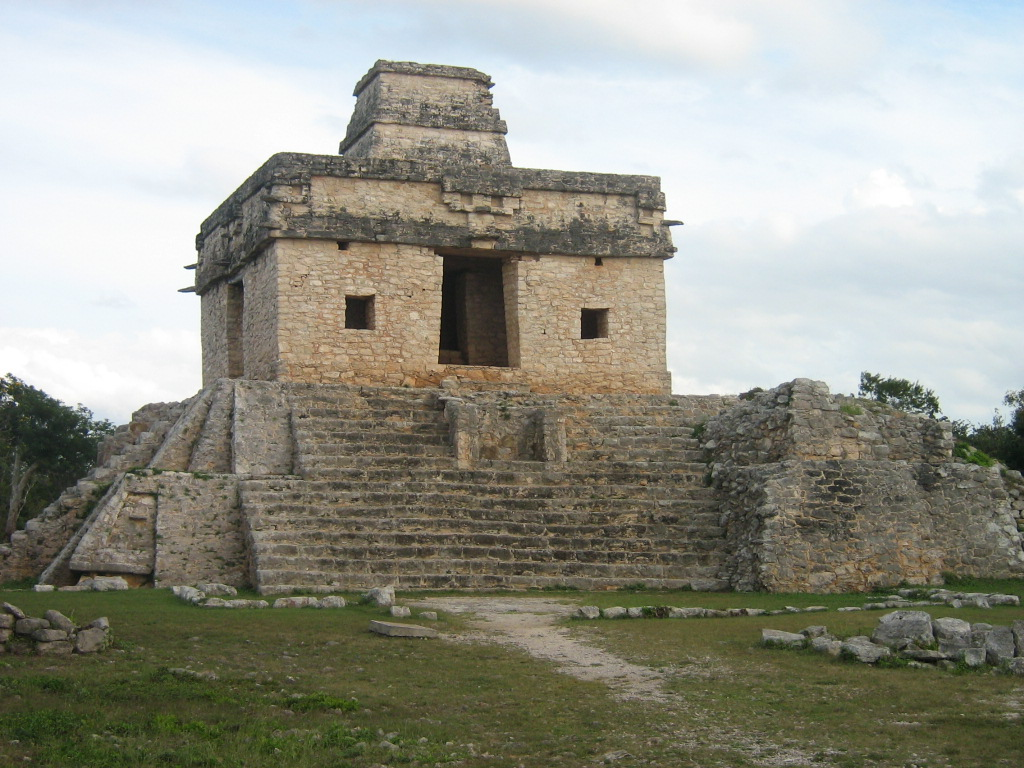
Dzibilchaltun

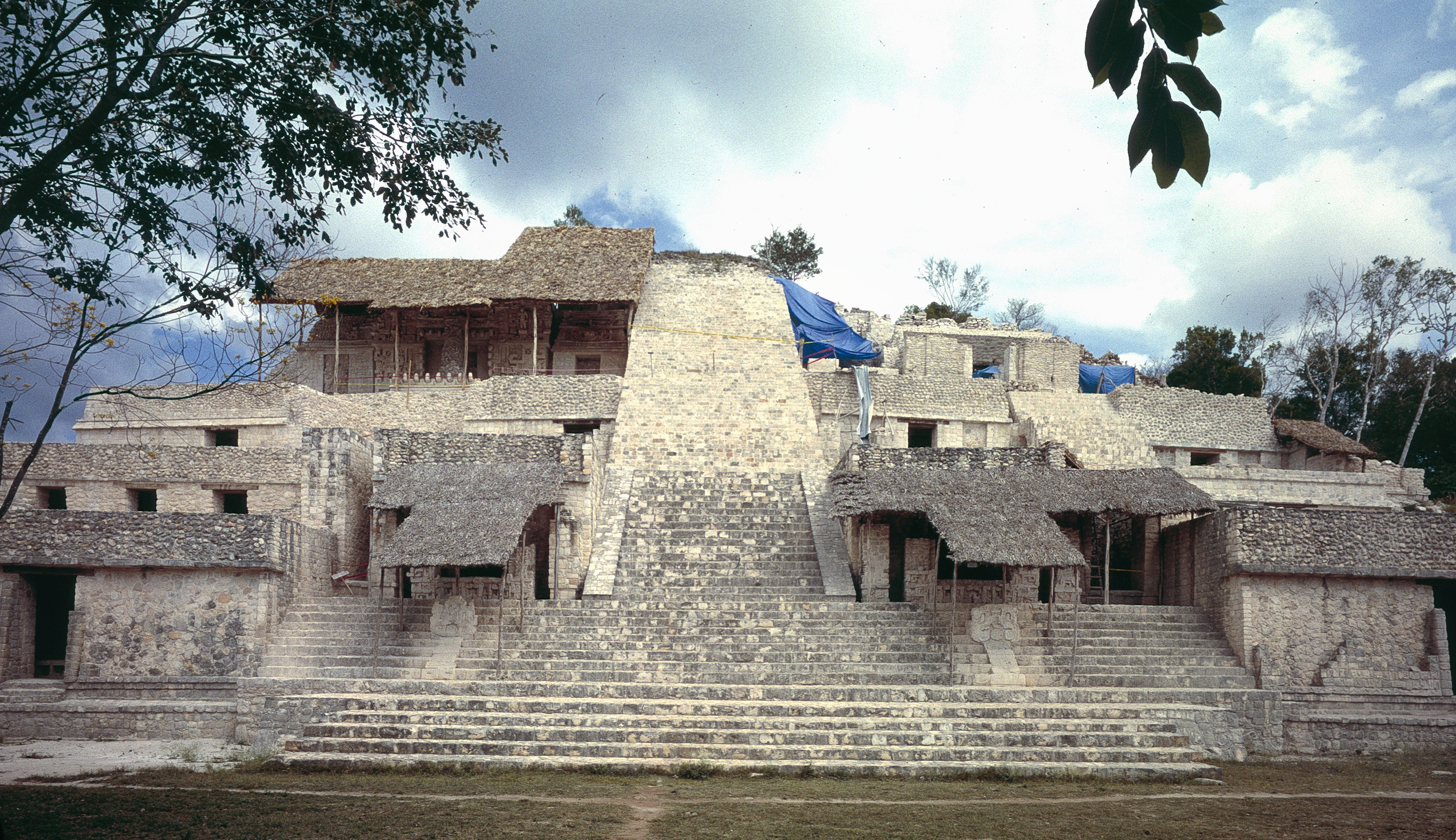
Ek' Balam

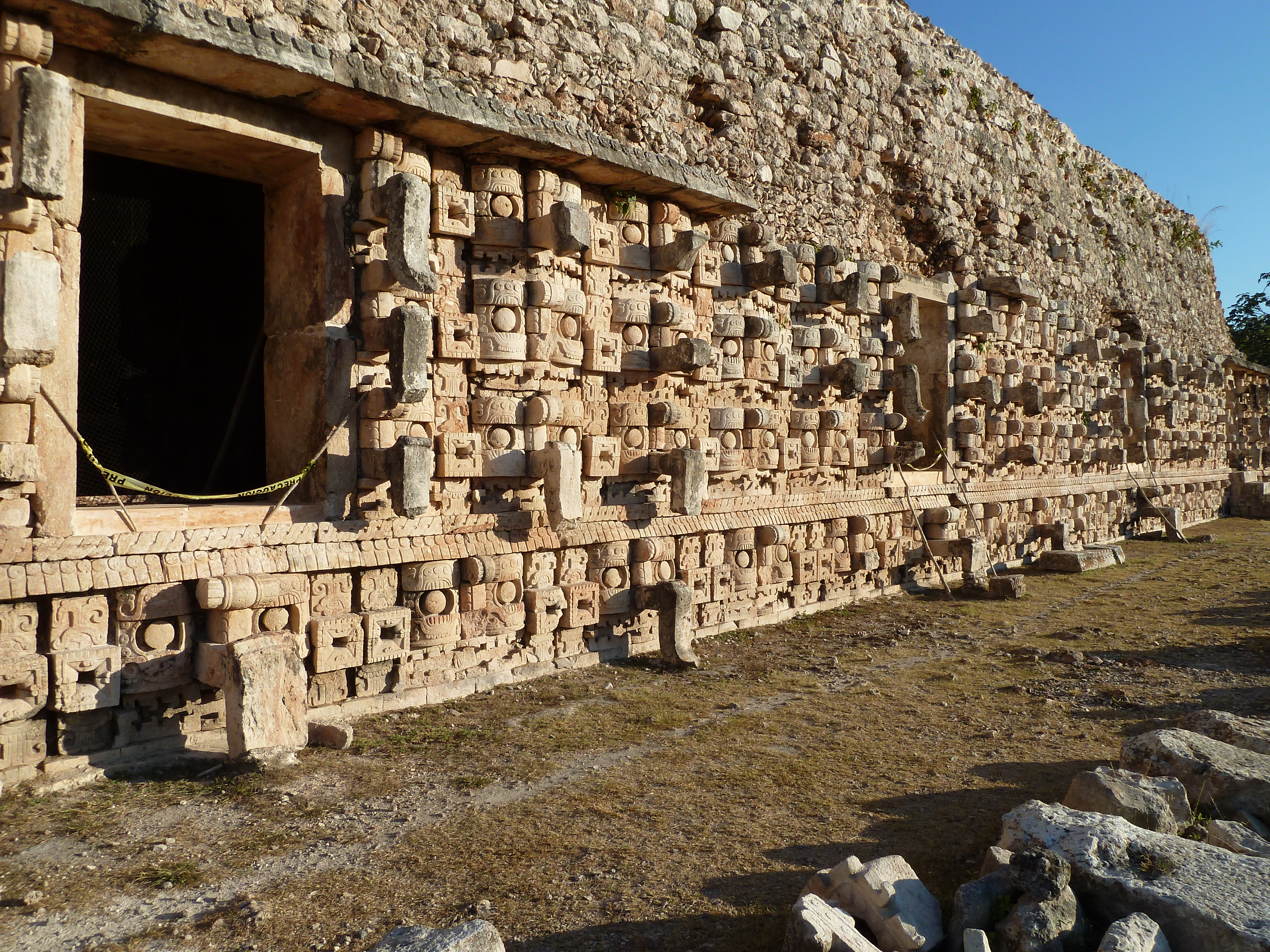
Kabah

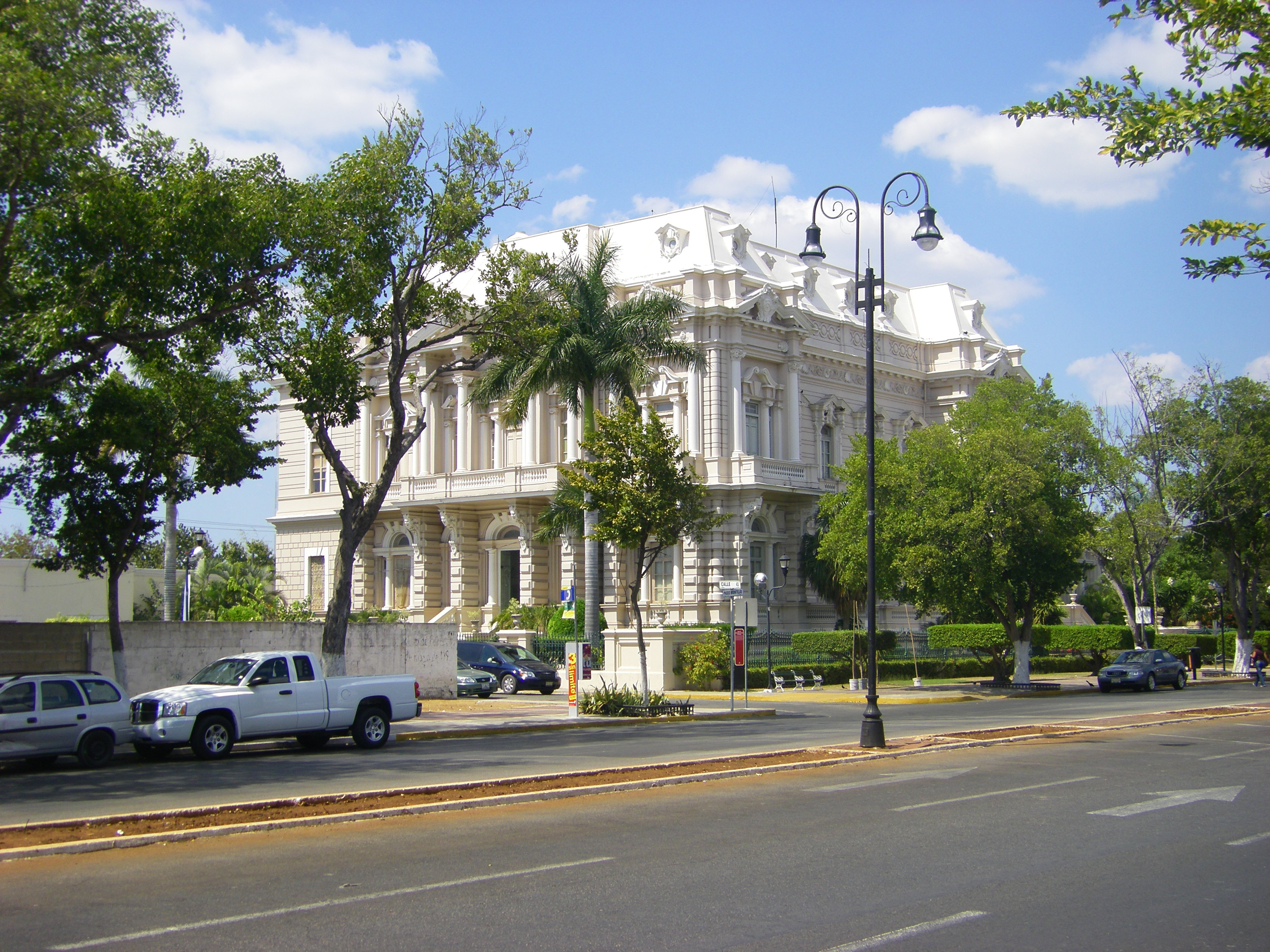
Mérida

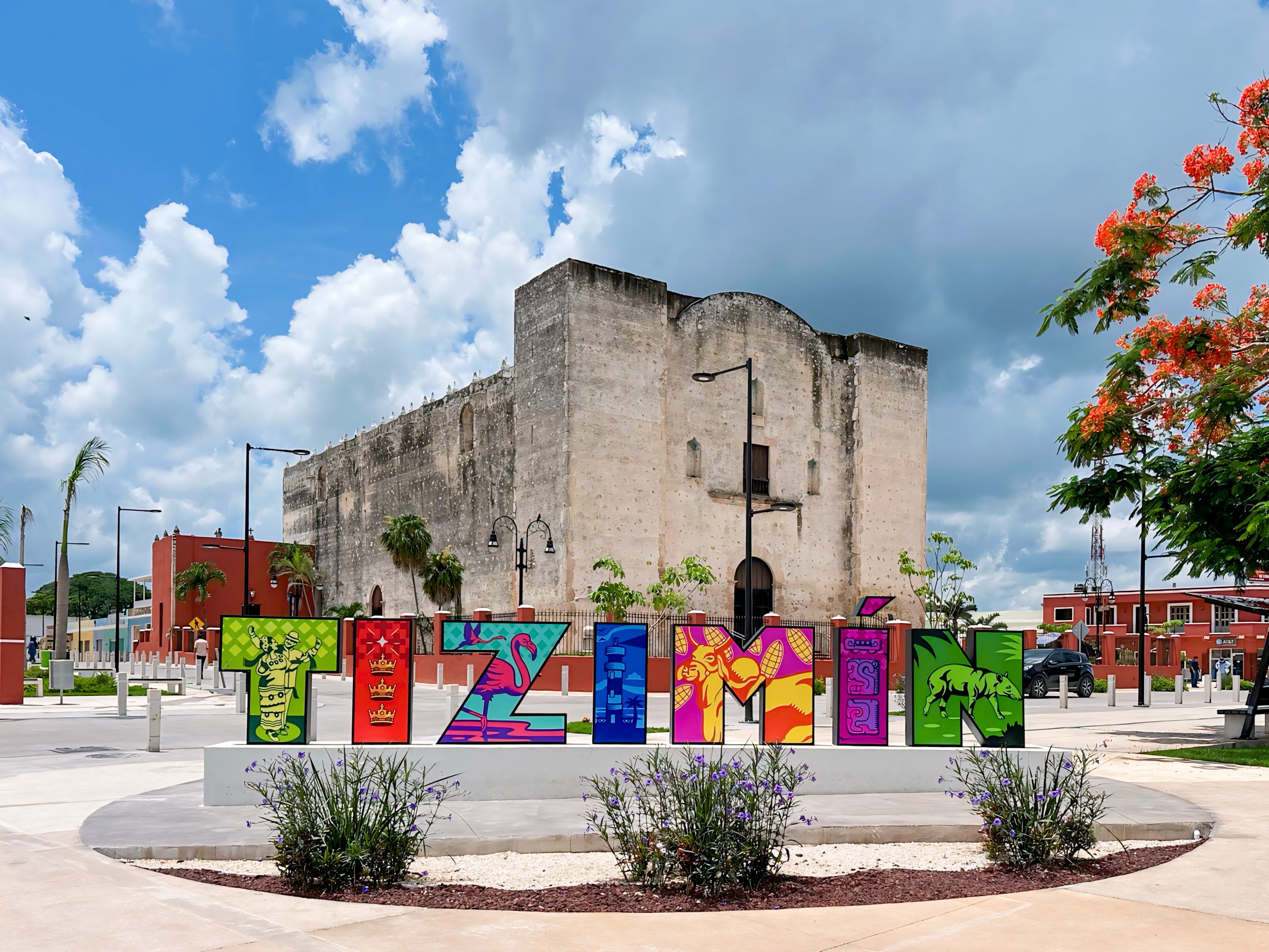
Tizimín

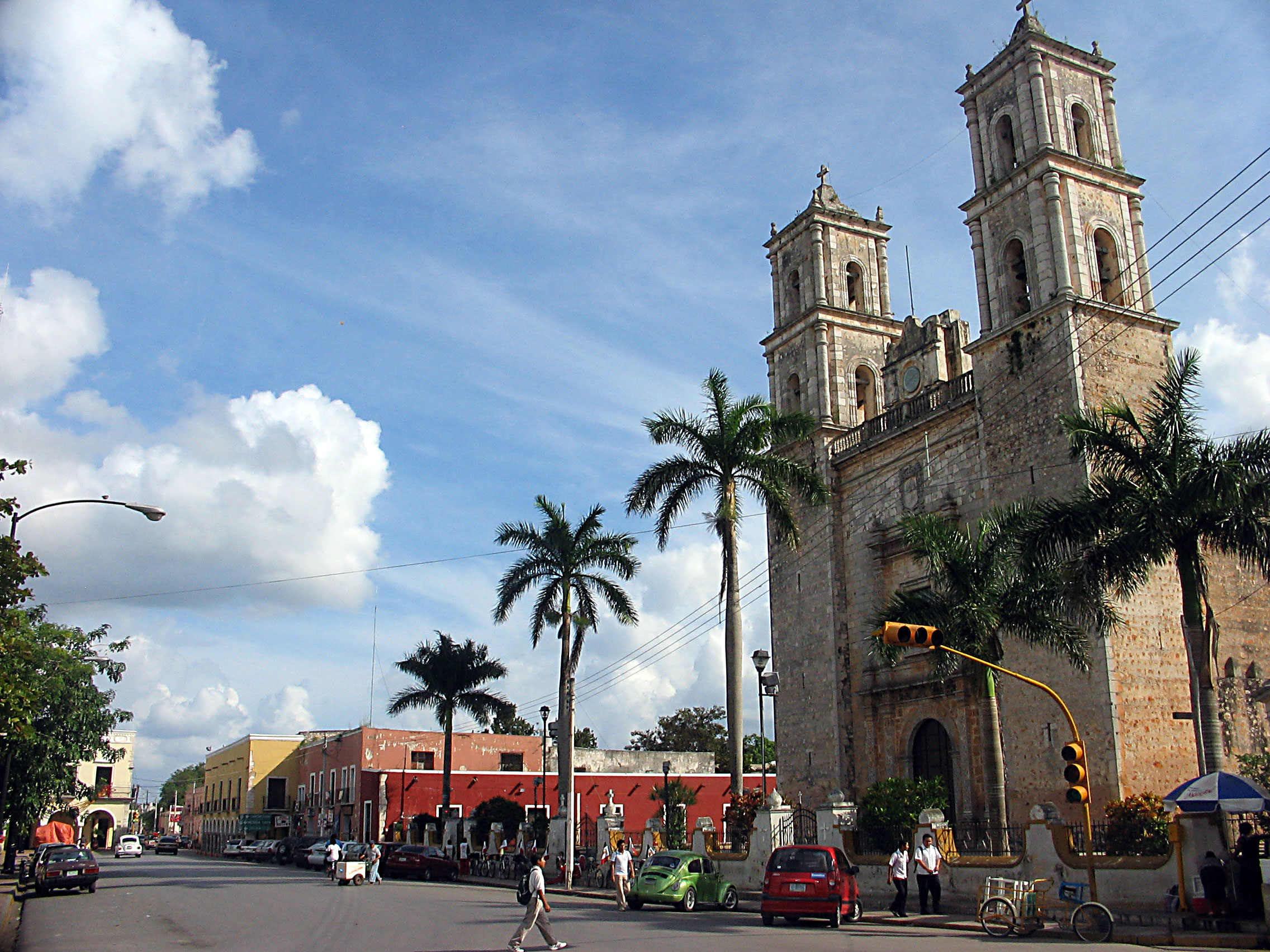
Valladolid

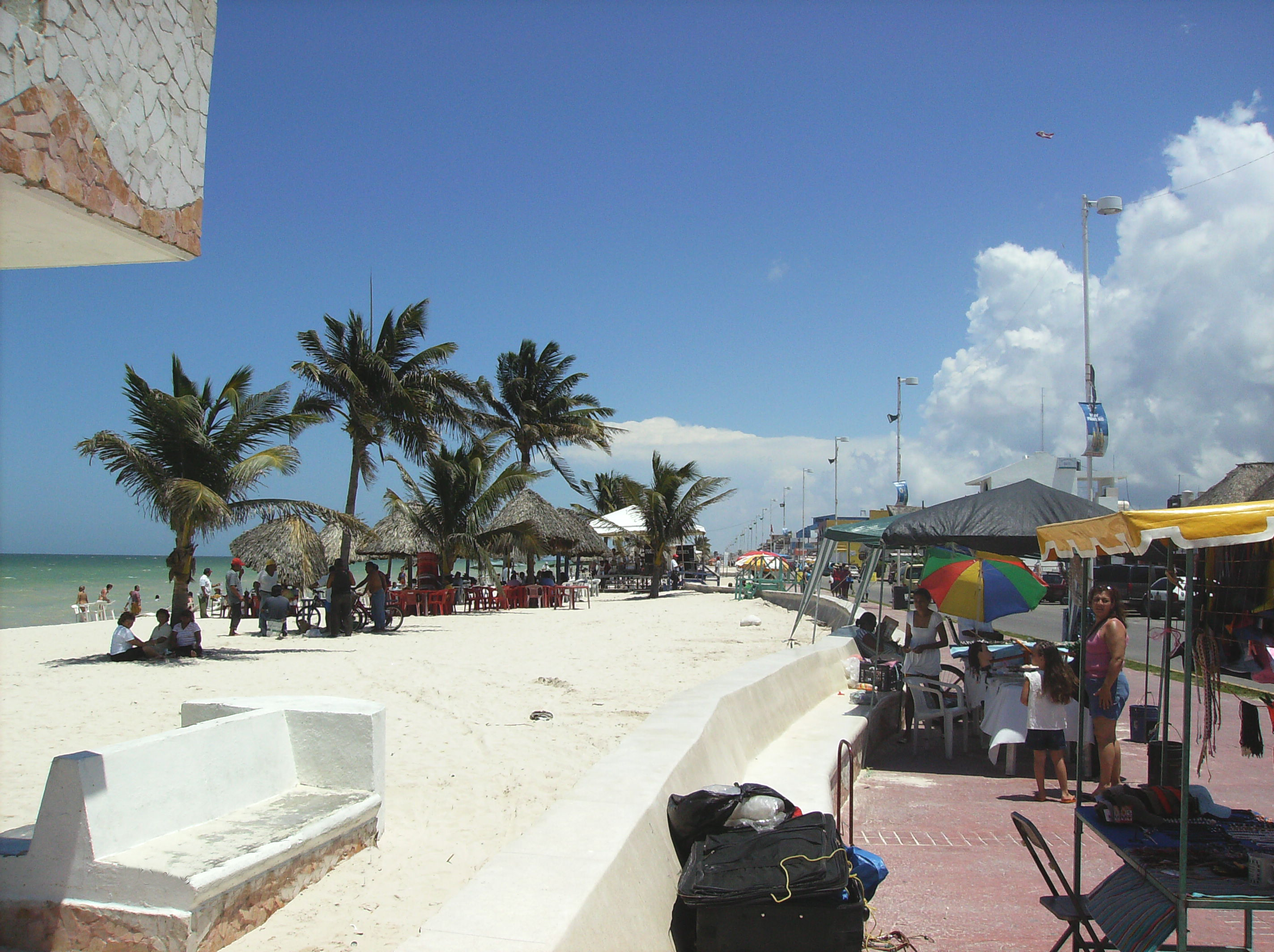
Progreso

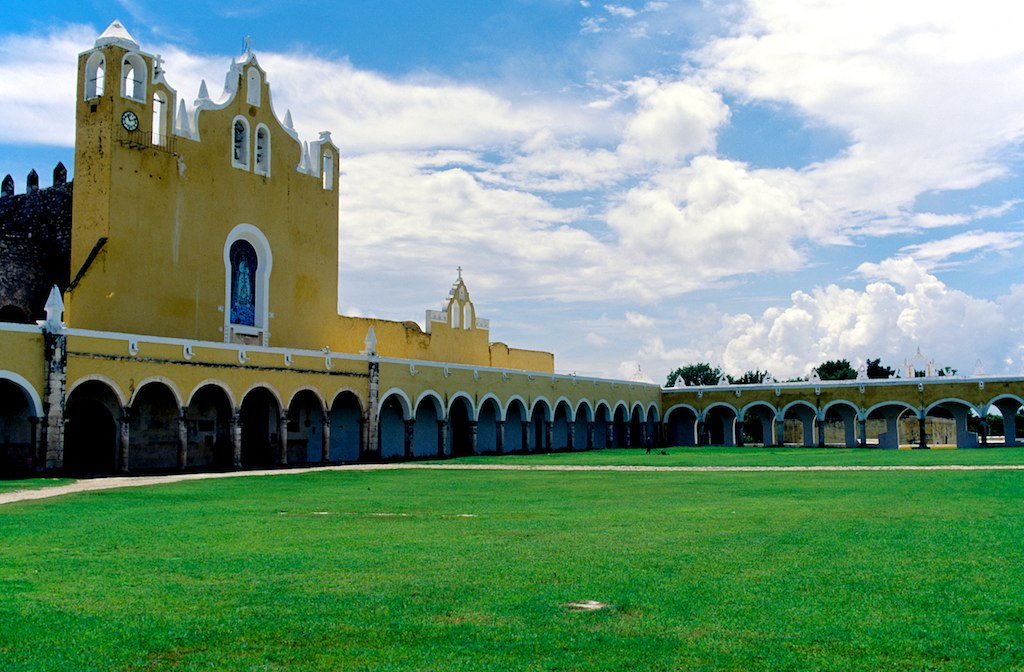
Izamal

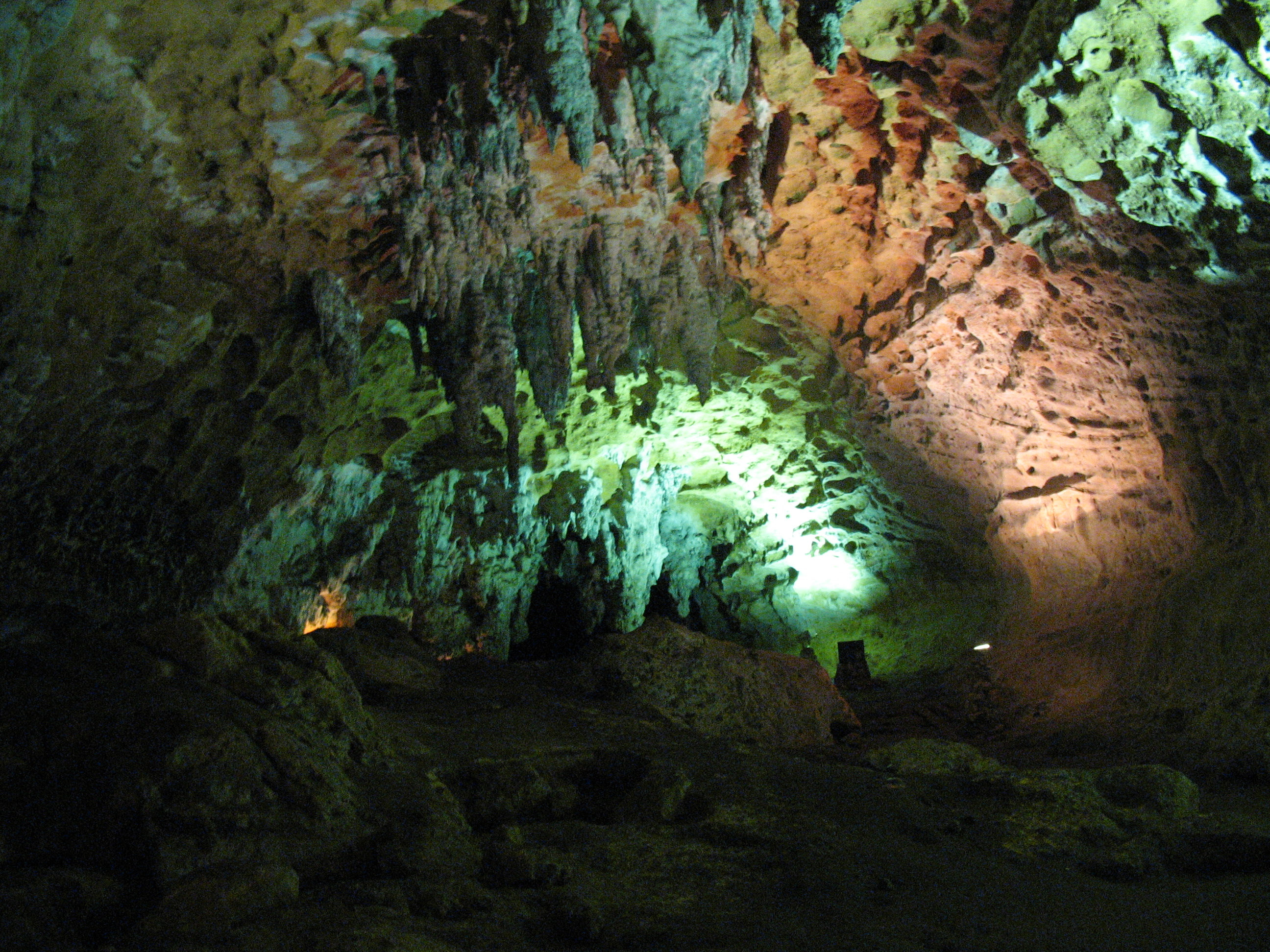
Loltun, Oxkutzcab

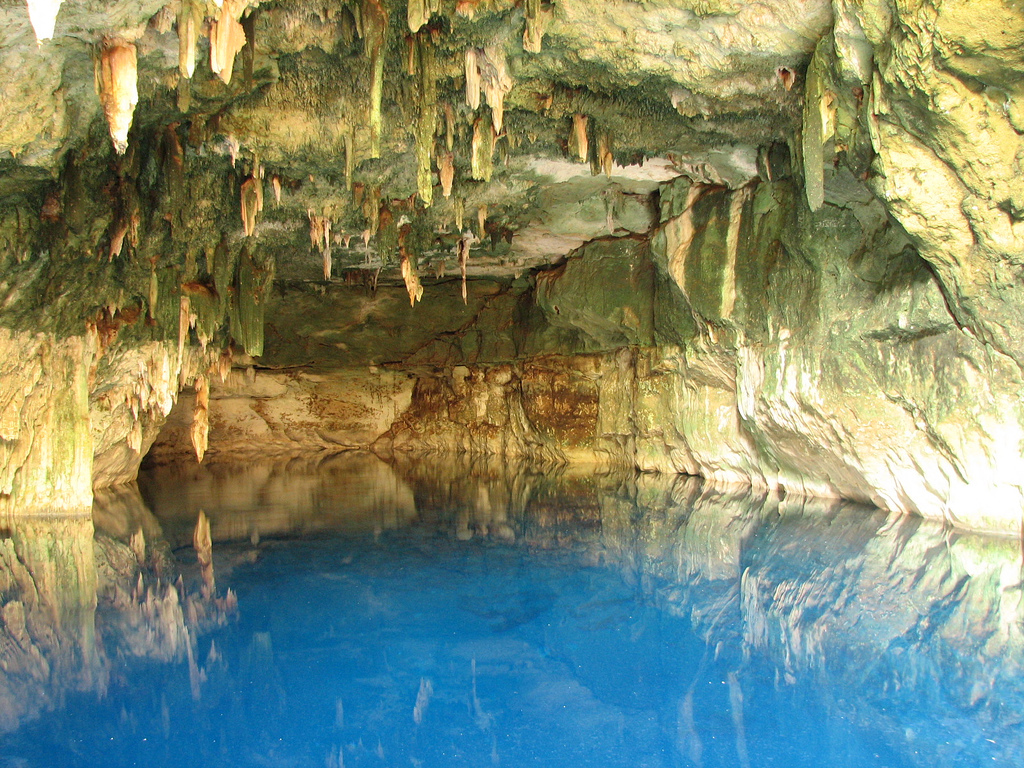
Bolón-Chohol, Cuzamá

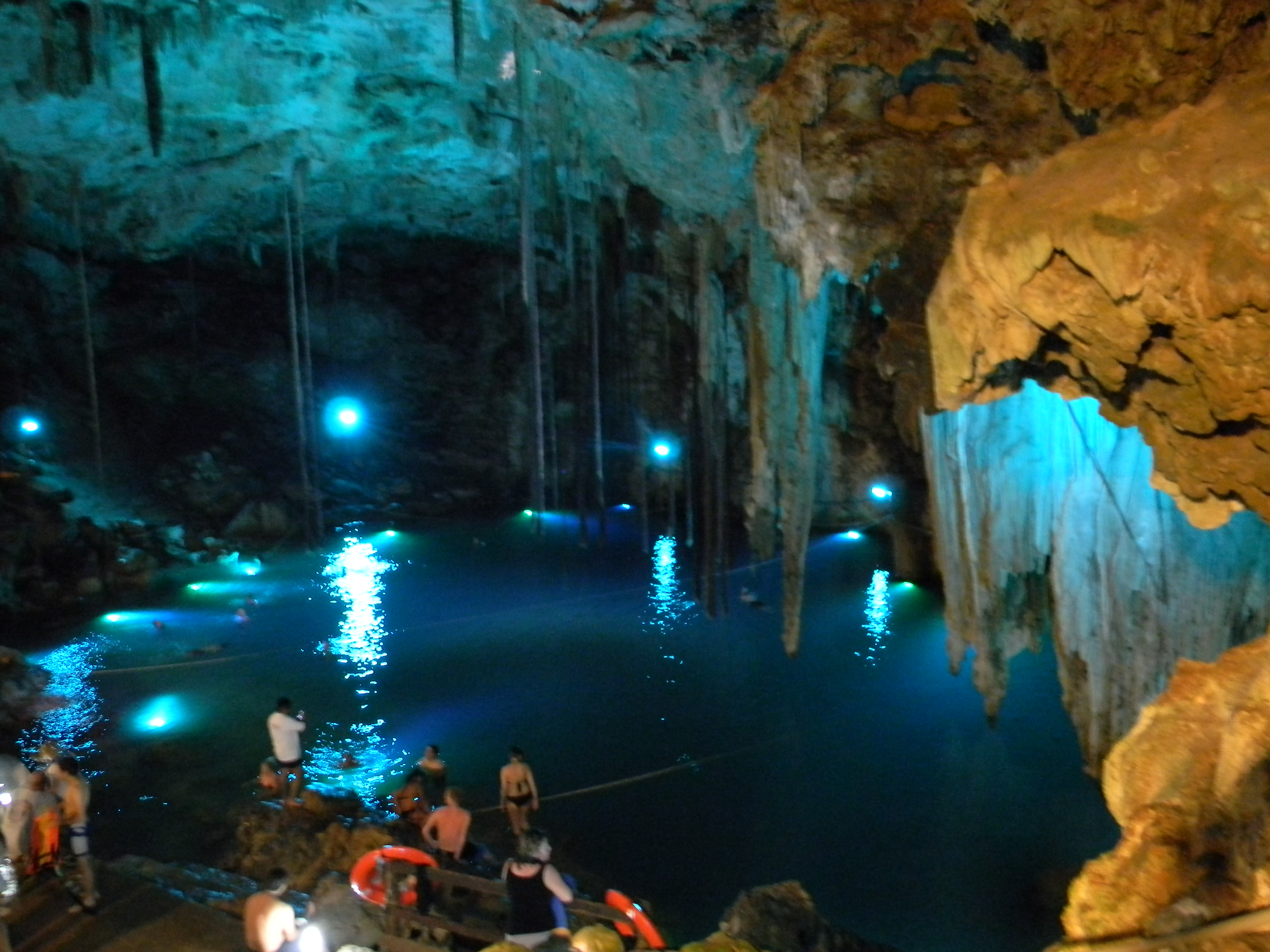
Dzitnup, Valladolid

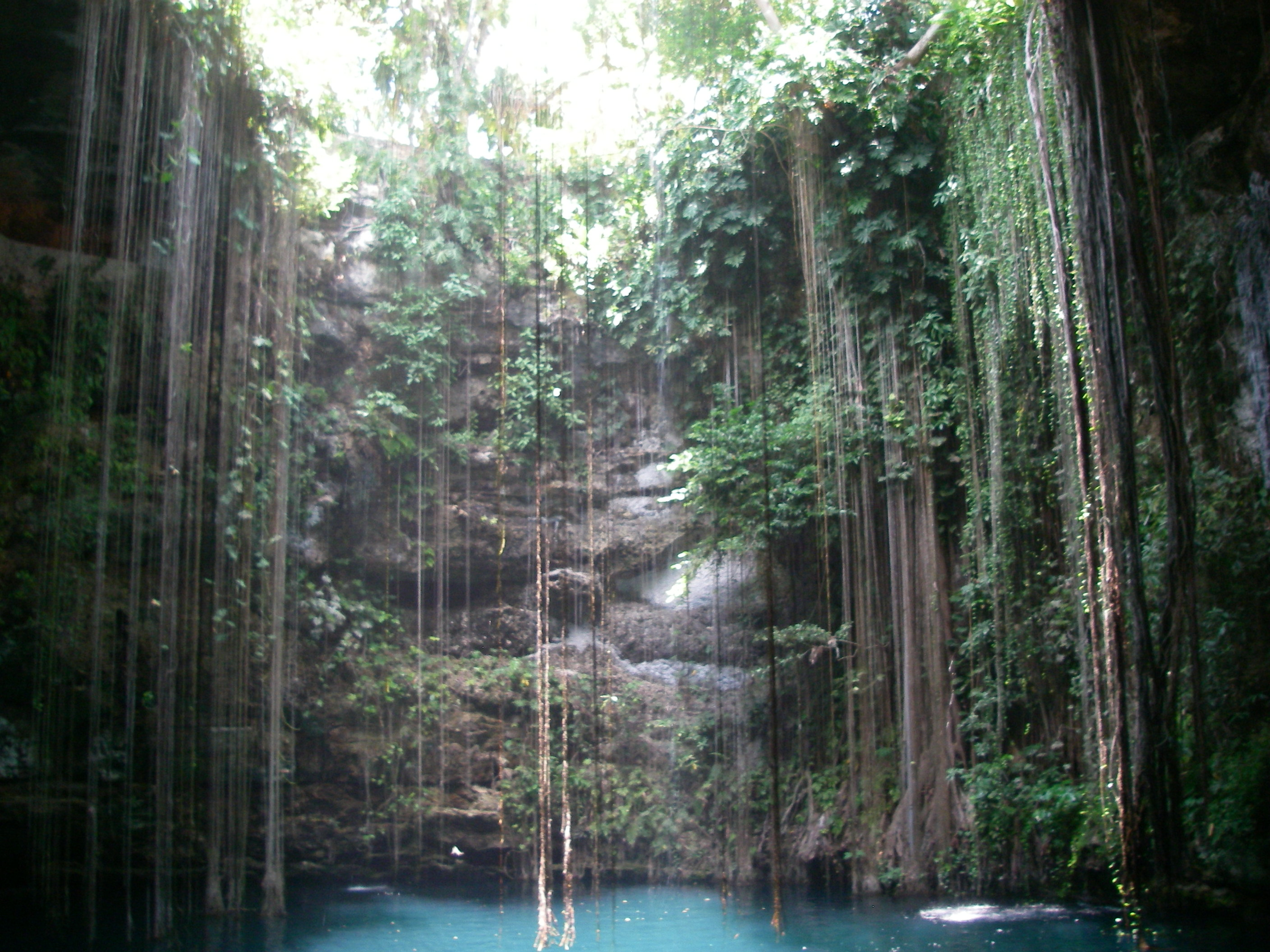
Ik Kil, Kaua

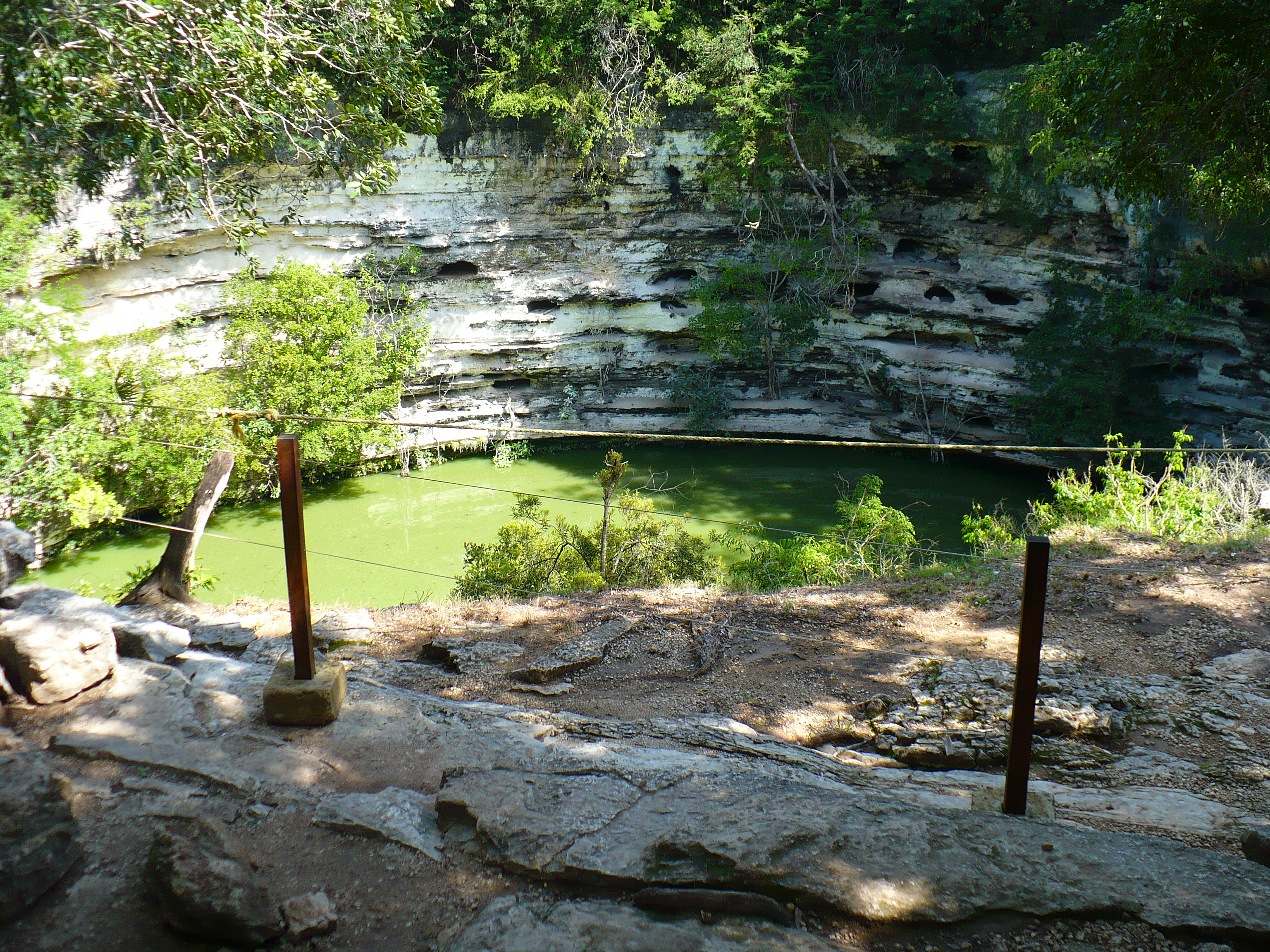
Sacred Cenote, Chichen Itza

== Media ==
Newspapers of Yucatán include: Artículo 7, De Peso (Mérida), Diario de Yucatán, La I Noticias para Mí Mérida, Milenio Novedades (Antes El Mundo al Día), and Por Esto! (Yucatán).

== Cuisine ==
Yucatecan food is its own unique style and is very different from what most people would consider Mexican food. It includes influences from the local Maya culture, as well as Caribbean, European (Spanish), (North) African, and Middle Eastern cultures, as well as influence from the cuisine of other parts of Mexico.

There are many regional dishes. Some of them are:

- Poc Chuc, a Maya/Yucatecan version of barbecued pork.
- Salbutes and Panuchos. Salbutes are soft, cooked tortillas with lettuce, tomato, turkey, and avocado on top. Panuchos feature fried tortillas filled with black beans and topped with turkey or chicken, lettuce, avocado and pickled onions. Habanero chiles accompany most dishes, either in solid or puréed form, along with fresh limes and corn tortillas.
- Queso relleno, a "gourmet" dish featuring ground pork inside of a carved Edam cheese ball served with tomato sauce and gravy.
- Pavo en Relleno Negro, a turkey meat stew cooked with a black paste made from roasted chiles, a local version of the mole de guajalote found throughout Mexico. The meat soaked in the black soup is also served in tacos, sandwiches and even in panuchos or salbutes and is usually referred to as "Relleno negro".
- Sopa de Lima, a lime-flavored soup with meat (turkey, chicken, or pork), served with tortilla chips.
- Papadzules, egg tacos covered in pumpkin seed sauce and tomatoes.
- Cochinita Pibil, a marinated pork dish and by far the most renowned of Yucatecan food.
- Xcatik, a type of chili.
- Pavo en Relleno Blanco (or simply "Relleno Blanco"), a turkey stew almost like Pavo en Relleno Negro.
- Xnipec, a fiery hot salsa or relish similar to pico de gallo, made with habanero chiles and Seville orange juice

== Safety ==
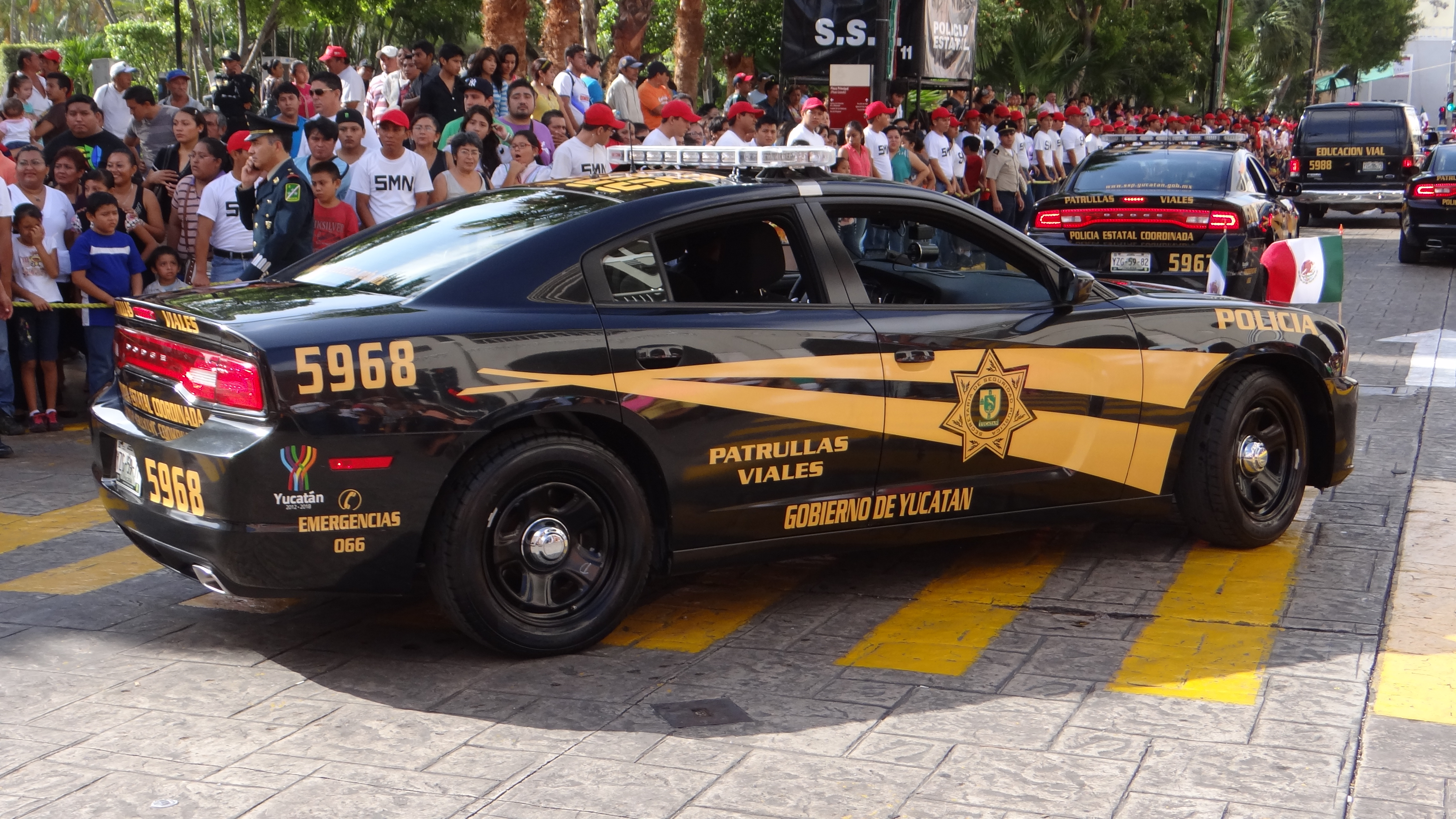
A Dodge Charger squad car of the State Police

As of 2016 the Mexican National Public Security System ranked Yucatán among the safest Mexican states. It is one of the two states the U.S. advises its citizens to exercise normal precautions, alongside neighbouring Campeche. Yucatán is the safest state in Mexico and Mérida was awarded City of Peace in 2011.

The Yucatán State Police is the law enforcement agency inside the state. The security in the interior of the state was praised multiple times by former president Felipe Calderón Hinojosa, local and foreign businessmen, as well as by governor Ivonne Ortega Pacheco.

== See also ==
- Caste War of Yucatán
- Cenote
- Chicxulub crater
- Governor of Yucatán
- Himno de Yucatán
- Municipalities of Yucatán
- Spanish conquest of Yucatán
- Villa Carlota, Mexico
- Yucatán State Police

== Sources ==
- Ancona, Eligio (1878). M. Heredia Argüelles (ed.). Historia de Yucatán: Desde la época más remota hasta nuestros días. Mérida, México. OCLC 2688499.
- Díaz del Castillo, Bernal (2005) [1568]. Historia verdadera de la conquista de la Nueva España: Manuscrito "Guatemala". UNAM. ISBN 9681211960.
- Molina Solís, Juan Francisco (1896). Historia del descubrimiento y conquista de Yucatán, con una reseña de la historia antigua de esta península (1st ed.). Mérida de Yucatán: Impr. y lit. R. Caballero. OCLC 6955452. OL 23361775M.
- de Landa, Diego (1984). Relación de las cosas de Yucatán. Consejo Editorial de Yucatán. OCLC 17926841.
- López de Cogolludo, Diego (2007) [1688]. Historia de Yucatán. Linkgua ediciones S. L. ISBN 978-84-9816-640-8.
- de Motolinía, Toribio (1985) [1858]. George Baudot (ed.). Historia de los Indios de la Nueva España. Castalia. ISBN 84-7039-464-9.
- Silva, Oswaldo (2006). Civilizaciones prehispánicas de América. Santiago de Chile, Chile: Editor Universitaria. ISBN 9561118572. OCLC 494412139.
