= Ana Teresa Aranda =

Mexican politician

Personal details
- Political party: National Action Party

Ana Teresa Aranda Orozco (born January 26, 1954, in León, Guanajuato) is a Mexican politician affiliated with the National Action Party who served as Director of the DIF (the "National System for Integral Family Development") from 2000 to 2006. In January 2006 President Vicente Fox designated her Secretary of Social Development.

== Political career ==
Aranda has been an active member of the National Action Party in the state of Puebla. From 1995 to 1998 she served as state president of the PAN. In 1998 she unsuccessfully ran for the governorship of Puebla and in the 2000 elections she unsuccessfully ran for a seat in the Senate. In the 2021 mid-terms she was elected to the Chamber of Deputies to represent Puebla's 9th district during the 65th Congress.

She sought election as one of Puebla's senators in the 2024 Senate election, occupying the second place on the Fuerza y Corazón por México coalition's two-name formula. She was not elected, although Néstor Camarillo Medina of the Institutional Revolutionary Party (PRI), running as the first name on the same formula, was.

Preceded by Josefina Vázquez Mota	Secretary of Social Development; January 2005–November 2006	Succeeded by Beatriz Zavala Peniche
