= Beatriz Zavala =

Mexican politician

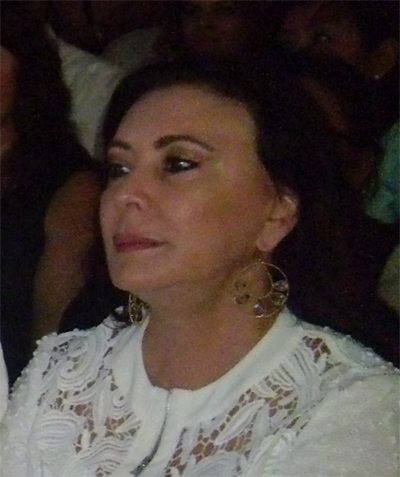
- Beatriz Zavala Peniche

Secretary of Social Development
- President: Felipe Calderón
- Preceded by: Ana Teresa Aranda
- Succeeded by: Ernesto J. Cordero

Personal details
- Born: María Beatriz Zavala Peniche; 23 October 1957 (age 68) Mérida, Yucatán, Mexico
- Education: Autonomous University of Yucatán; University of Kentucky

María Beatriz Zavala Peniche (born October 23, 1957, in Mérida, Yucatán) is a Mexican politician affiliated with the National Action Party PAN who has served in the lower and upper house of the Mexican Congress. In 2006 Felipe Calderón designated her as Secretary of Social Development.

== Personal life and education ==
Zavala holds a bachelor's degree in anthropology from the Autonomous University of Yucatán (UADY) and studies towards a master degree in sociology from the University of Kentucky. She has been a professor of the UADY.

== Political career ==
Zavala is an active member of the PAN since 1995. From 1997 to 2000 she served in the Chamber of Deputies of Mexico during the LVII Legislature; from 2001 to 2003 she served as local deputy in the Congress of Yucatán; then from 2003 to 2006 she served again in the Chamber of Deputies this time during the LIX Legislature. In 2006 she won a seat in the Senate of Mexico representing Yucatán but left that position to join Felipe Calderón's presidential cabinet as Secretary of Social Development. In January 2008 she left the cabinet and returned to the senate.

Preceded by Ana Teresa Aranda	Secretary of Social Development; 2006—2008	Succeeded by Ernesto J. Cordero
