= Muxupip Municipality =

Municipality in the Mexican state of Yucatán

Muxupip
- Municipality
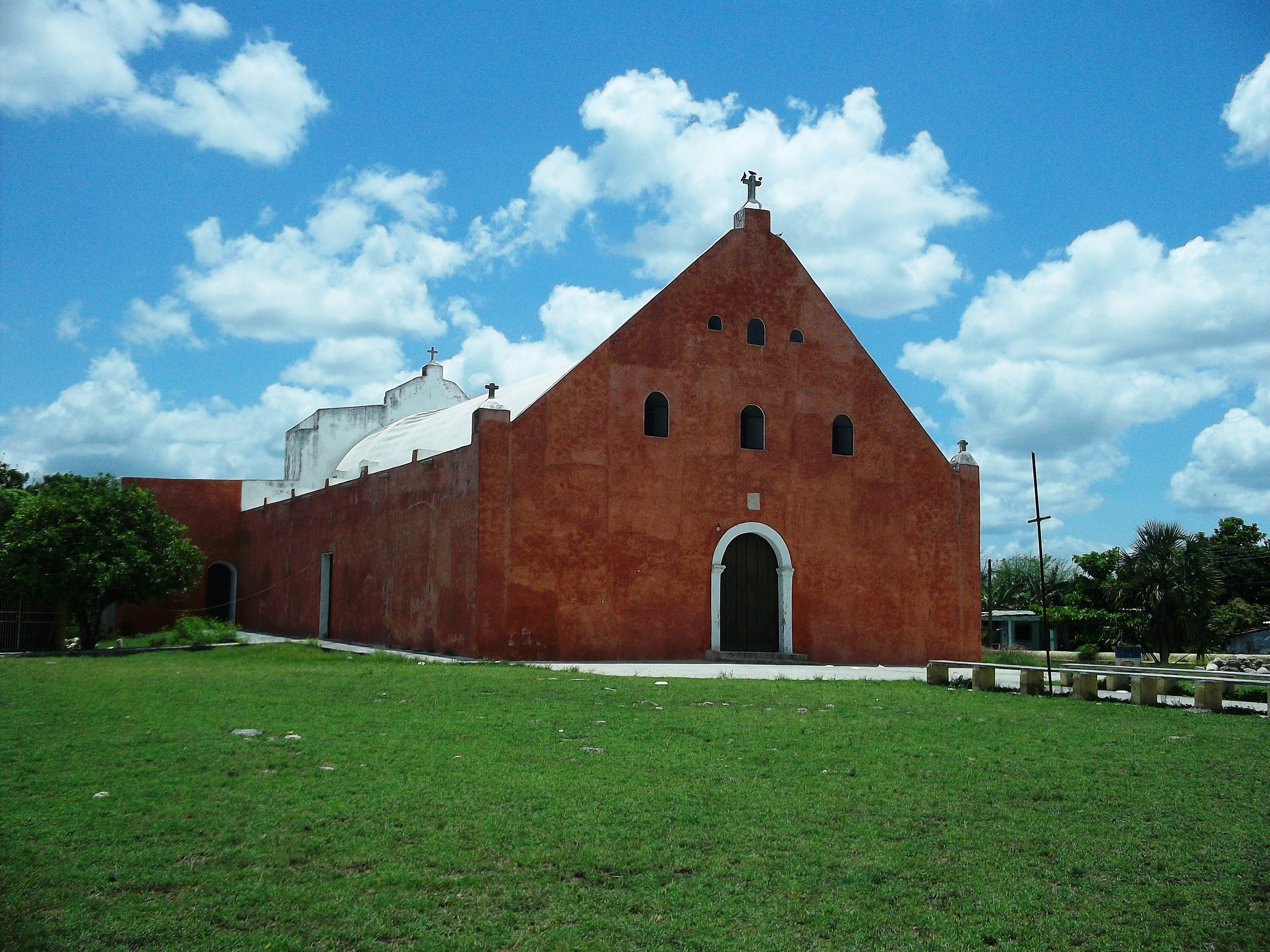
- Principal Church of Muxupip, Yucatán

- Municipal location in Yucatán

- Location of the Municipality in Mexico
- Coordinates: 21°02′31″N 89°19′47″W
- Country: Mexico
- State: Yucatán

Government
  - Type: 2012–2015
  - Municipal President: José Del Carmen Escareno Ake

Area
  - Total: 54.93 km^{2} (21.21 sq mi)
- Elevation: 8 m (26 ft)

Population (2010)
  - Total: 2,755
- Time zone: UTC-6 (Central Standard Time)
- INEGI Code: 054
- Major Airport: Merida (Manuel Crescencio Rejón) International Airport
- IATA Code: MID
- ICAO Code: MMMD

Muxupip Municipality (In the Yucatec Maya Language: “buried bread”) is a municipality in the Mexican state of Yucatán containing 54.93 square kilometres (21.21 sq mi) of land and located roughly 30 kilometres (19 mi) northeast of the city of Mérida. It is bounded on the north by Motul town, on the south by Cacalchén Municipality and on the east and the west by Yaxkukul Municipality and Tixkokob Municipality.

== Geography ==
The topography of the municipality is at an average elevation of 8 metres (26 ft). The water resources in the municipality is only of underground water known locally as cenotes, as there no surface water sources within its limits. The predominant climate here is of warm sub-humid conditions. Precipitation occurs in the months from May to July and the rainfall is only 45 millimetres (1.8 in). The average annual temperature is 26.2 °C (79.2 °F). The annual average relative humidity is 66% in March and 89% in December.

=== Wildlife ===
The flora recorded here consists of mostly deciduous forest, excluding the agricultural land. The fauna consists of birds such as the tzutzuy, quail, and dove, chachalaca. Mammals found here are opossum, rabbits and bats. Snakes and lizards are the reptiles reported here.

== History ==
During pre-Hispanic times, the town fell within the provinces under the chieftainship of Ceh Pech. According to archival documents in 1579 it was established Encomienda. After the conquest the area became part of the encomienda system. In 1700, Simón Osorio was the encomendero.

Yucatán declared its independence from the Spanish Crown in 1821 and in 1825, the area was assigned to the Motul Municipality. In 1927 it was designated as its own municipality.

== Governance ==
The municipal president is elected for a three-year term. The present president is Dose Del Carmen Escareno Ake (2012–2015). The town council has four councilpersons, who serve as Secretary and councilors of public works, parks and gardens and public lighting.

The Municipal Council administers the business of the municipality. It is responsible for budgeting and expenditures and producing all required reports for all branches of the municipal administration. Annually it determines educational standards for schools.

The Police Commissioners ensure public order and safety. They are tasked with enforcing regulations, distributing materials and administering rulings of general compliance issued by the council.

== Communities ==
The head of the municipality is Muxupip, Yucatán. The larger populated areas of the municipality include Catzín, Hacienda Ixim, Sac-Citán, San José Cholul, San José Grande, and San Juan Koop. The significant populations are shown below:

Community	Population
Entire Municipality (2010)	2,755
Muxupip	2280 in 2005
San José Grande	35 in 2005
San Juan Koop	311 in 2005

The municipality belongs to the Second Federal Electoral Local District and the Ninth Ward.

== Local festivals ==
Every year from 24 to 27 January is the celebration for the town's patroness, the Virgin of the Assumption. There is also a fiesta held on 25 August in honor of St. James.

== Tourist attractions ==
The notable monuments in the municipality are the Temple of Santiago, the Chapel and the Holy Cross dated to the seventeenth century and the main building of the Hacienda Catzmil.
