= Carrillo Puerto =

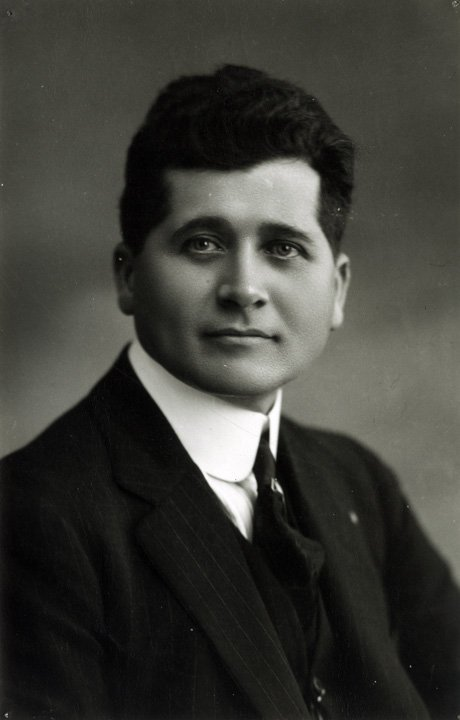
Felipe Carrillo Puerto in 1918

Felipe Carrillo Puerto (1874–1924) was a Mexican journalist, politician and revolutionary who served as governor of Yucatán from 1922 until his assassination in 1924.

Places and things named for him include:

- Felipe Carrillo Puerto, Michoacán
- Felipe Carrillo Puerto, Oaxaca
- Felipe Carrillo Puerto, Quintana Roo
- Carrillo Puerto (municipality) in Veracruz
- Motul de Carrillo Puerto in Yucatán
- Aeropuerto Internacional Felipe Carrillo Puerto in Tulum, Quintana Roo
- The Libramiento Felipe Carrillo Puerto, a toll highway in Quintana Roo
- Carrillo Puerto station, on the route of the Tren Maya railway in Campeche
- The Carrillo Puerto Formation, a geologic formation in Yucatán

Other people with the name:

- Elvia Carrillo Puerto (1878–1968), politician and feminist activist, his sister

For articles relating to Carrillo Puerto's other siblings, see the Spanish-language Wikipedia at es:Carrillo Puerto.
