= Telchac Pueblo Municipality =

Municipality in the Mexican state of Yucatán

- Municipality
- Coat of arms

- Location of Telchac Pueblo within State of Yucatan

- Location of the Municipality in Mexico
- Coordinates: 21°12′21″N 89°15′29″W
- Country: Mexico
- State: Yucatán
- Municipality: Telchac Pueblo
- IDH: ▲0.818 high

Government
  - Type: Ayuntamiento
  - Body: H. Ayuntamiento de Telchac Pueblo
  - Municipal president: Heyder Alfredo Maldonado Lopez

Area
  - Total: 31.564 sq mi (81.75 km^{2})
- Elevation: 32 ft (9.8 m)

Population (2005)
  - Total: 3,557
  - Density: 112.7/sq mi (43.51/km^{2})
- Demonym: Telchaqueño(a)
- Time zone: UTC-6 (Central Standard Time)
- ZIP: 97400
- Calling Code: 991

The Telchac Pueblo Municipality (es: Municipio de Telchac Pueblo) is a municipality in the Mexican state of Yucatán. It is located to the north of the Yucatán Peninsula.

== Toponymy ==
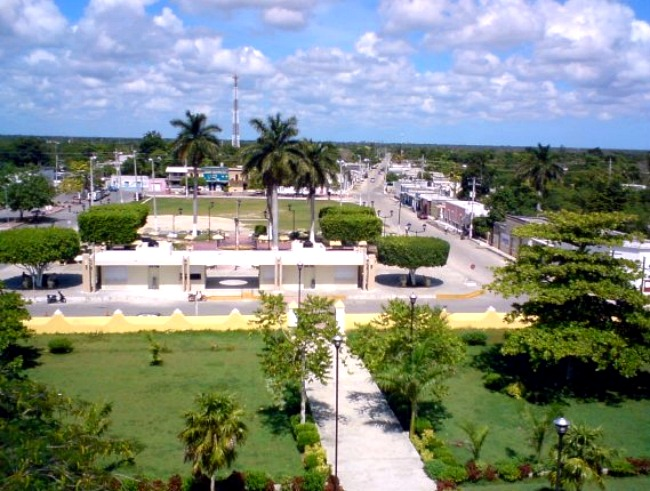
Downtown from top of Church

The name of municipality comes from the Maya language and officially translated into Spanish means "Rain or necessary water", as the result of the words Tel, contraction of teel, indispensable or necessary and chac, contraction of chaac, rain or water. Erroneously it is said that meaning is "Red Rooster" (Tel means rooster and Chac means red).

The denomination "Pueblo" (English: Town), is used to differentiate it from the nearby town called Telchac Puerto (English: Port of Telchac). Both were once a single municipality, but in 1932, for political problems, it split into two municipalities. When Telchac Puerto was part of Telchac Pueblo its name was Miramar, and even now there is an area that keeps that name in Telchac Puerto, Telchac Pueblo kept that area after the separation, but eventually, lost that part and the town lost all the territory bordering the sea.

== Geography ==
Telchac Pueblo is located in the north-central part of the state of Yucatán, and has a land area of 81.75 square kilometers. It shares borders on the north with the Telchac Puerto Municipality, on the east with the Sinanché Municipality, on the south with Motul Municipality and on the west with Dzemul Municipality.

=== Topography and hydrography ===
As in most of the Yucatán Peninsula, the territory is quite flat, reaching a maximum altitude of 10 meters above sea level, and slopes gently downward from south to north, towards the Gulf of Mexico; physiographically the whole territory belongs to the Yucatecan Carso.

All over town there are no rivers due to high soil permeability, this is a characteristic of the Yucatan area: water seeps into the ground where it forms underground rivers that form cenotes, which are outcrops to the surface of these subterranean river, in Telchac Pueblo there are 11 cenotes, 10 of which are open and a 1 semi-open. The entire town is part of the Yucatan Basin belonging to the Northern Yucatan hydrological region.

=== Climate and Ecosystems ===
In Telchac Pueblo there are two kind of climate, in the extreme south the climate is classified as Warm humid with rains in summer, less humid, and the rest of the municipality is Semidry warm and very warm; annual average temperature recorded is greater than 26 °C; Average annual precipitation increases from north to south, ergo, away from the coast in successive bands, the first from 500 to 600 mm, second from 600 to 700 mm, third from 700 to 800 mm and the last from 800 to 1,000 mm.

Telchac Pueblo is covered by tropical rainforest, but significant parts have been converted to agricultural and urban areas. Tree species include pochote (Ceiba pentandra), cedro (Cedrela odorata) and chacá (Bursera simaruba). Fauna includes rabbits, opossums, pocket gophers, eared dove, white-winged dove, and the endemic species of white owl and pájaro tho.

Geographic Maps of Telchac Pueblo
| Topography and hydrology | Climates |

== Demography ==
According to the results of the 2005 Census realized by the Instituto Nacional de Estadística y Geografía, the total population was 3,404 inhabitants, which 1,730 are men and 1,674 are women;, the annual population growth rate from 2000 to 2005 was 0.5%, 24.1% of the population is under 15 years of age, 62.9% from 15 to 64 years and 13% of over 64, 99.2% of inhabitants live in the county seat and 19.9% of the population over 5 years are speakers of an indigenous language, in this case, the Mayan language.

Urban areas

=== Urban areas ===
In Telchac Pueblo are a total of seven locations, the major and its total population in 2005 were:

| Seat | Population |
| Total | 3,404 |
| Telchac Pueblo | 3,377 |
| San Roque | 9 |
| San Isidro | 7 |

== Infrastructure ==
Infrastructure and communications

=== Communications ===
The municipality of Telchac Pueblo is connected to the rest of the state of Yucatan by land. Within its territory there are no ports, airports or airstrips.

The main road is the 172 state-owned, This road connects in north with Telchac Puerto, in south with the city of Motul where it connects with 176 federal highway; the second state-owned road connects in west with Dzemul and Baca, in east with Sinanché, Yobaín and Dzidzantún where it connects with 178 federal highway. There is also at the southern end of the municipality a secondary road from road 172 that communicates with the village of Uci, which belongs to the neighboring city of Motul.

=== Education ===
In education the town has two kindergartens, three elementary, one secondary and one high school. There is a library with free online computers and free wireless internet.

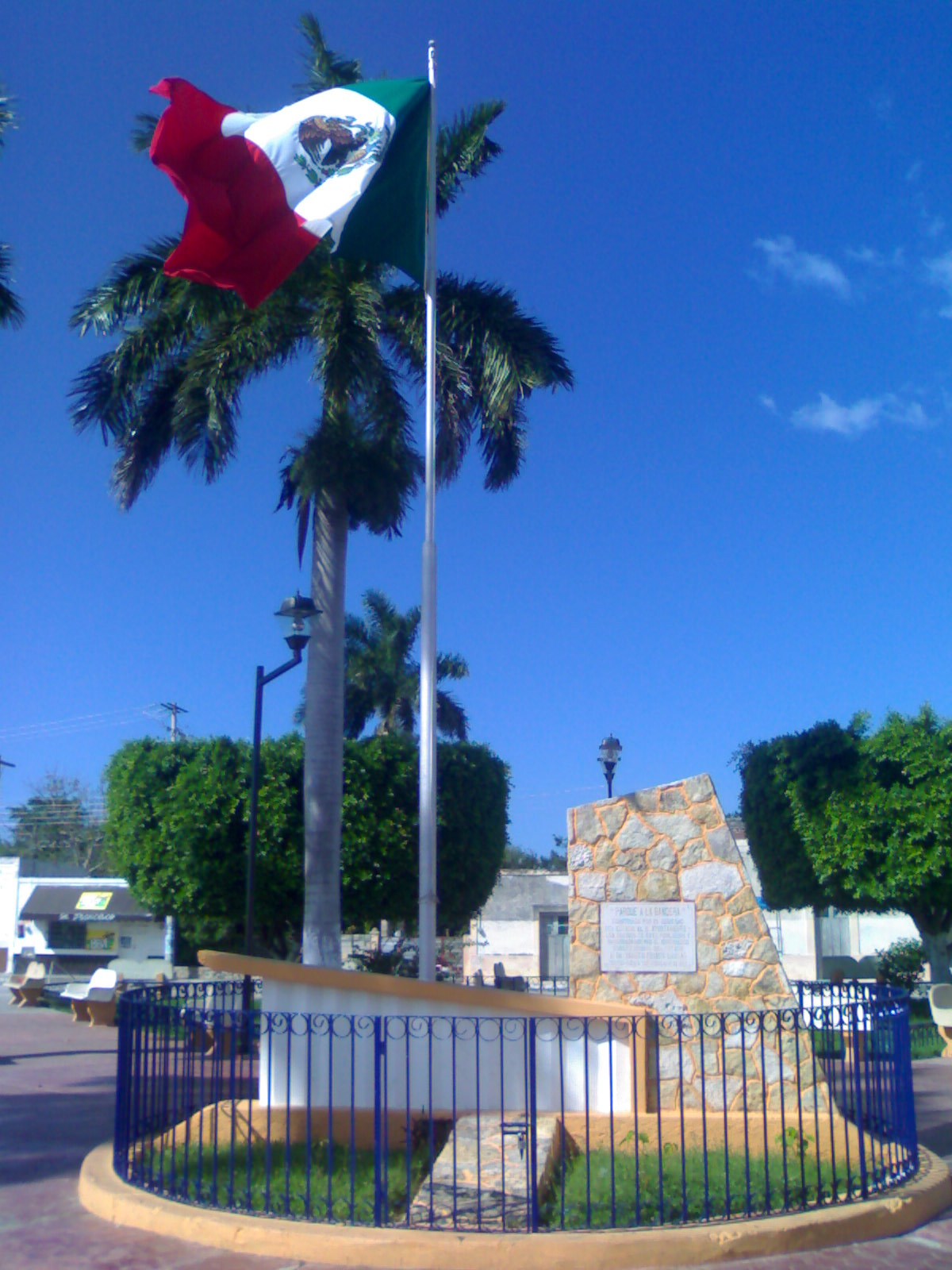
Park Dedicated to the Flag of Mexico.

=== Churches ===
The Catholic Church of San Francisco de Asís (St. Francis of Assisi) was originally dedicated to St. Lawrence Martyr, it is now dedicated to St. Francis of Assisi, the patron saint of the village. It is located on the east side of the communities center. The exact timeframe of construction is not known, but the building dates from the end of the 17th century. Many theories suggest the year 1693, but is not official.

While the majority of the population is Catholic, other churches are present in the community, including Presbyterian and Evangelical churches, a Jehovah's Witnesses Kingdom Hall and most recently a meetinghouse for the Church of Jesus Christ of Latter-day Saints.

=== Flag Park ===
This park is dedicated to the Mexican flag, which it proudly waves at its center monument. Its also a meeting and gathering point for the "Telchaqueños", most every day and night of the year you can find Telchaqueños out in the park "breathing fresh air" or just chatting, is a deeply rooted tradition among the residents, which in municipalities of the surrounding area is not seen as often. In addition, this park has 4 posts; two of them serve food, where people tend to eat at night, one serves snacks like "granisados" and "Machacados" the 4th is a small convenience store. The park has free wireless internet.

There are also another park called the "park to the mother", a gas station, a bank, three sports fields, two basketball courts and playground

== Economy ==
Most of the town's population is engaged in primary sector of the economy, particularly to agriculture. Animal husbandry is also important, particularly livestock.

Trade and manufacturing activity are other important sectors of economic activity in the municipality.

The professionals who work in the city of Mérida, other municipalities, other states or countries, strengthen the local economy via remittances. Professionals who work in the state, usually still live in Telchac Pueblo and only move to work.

== Politics ==
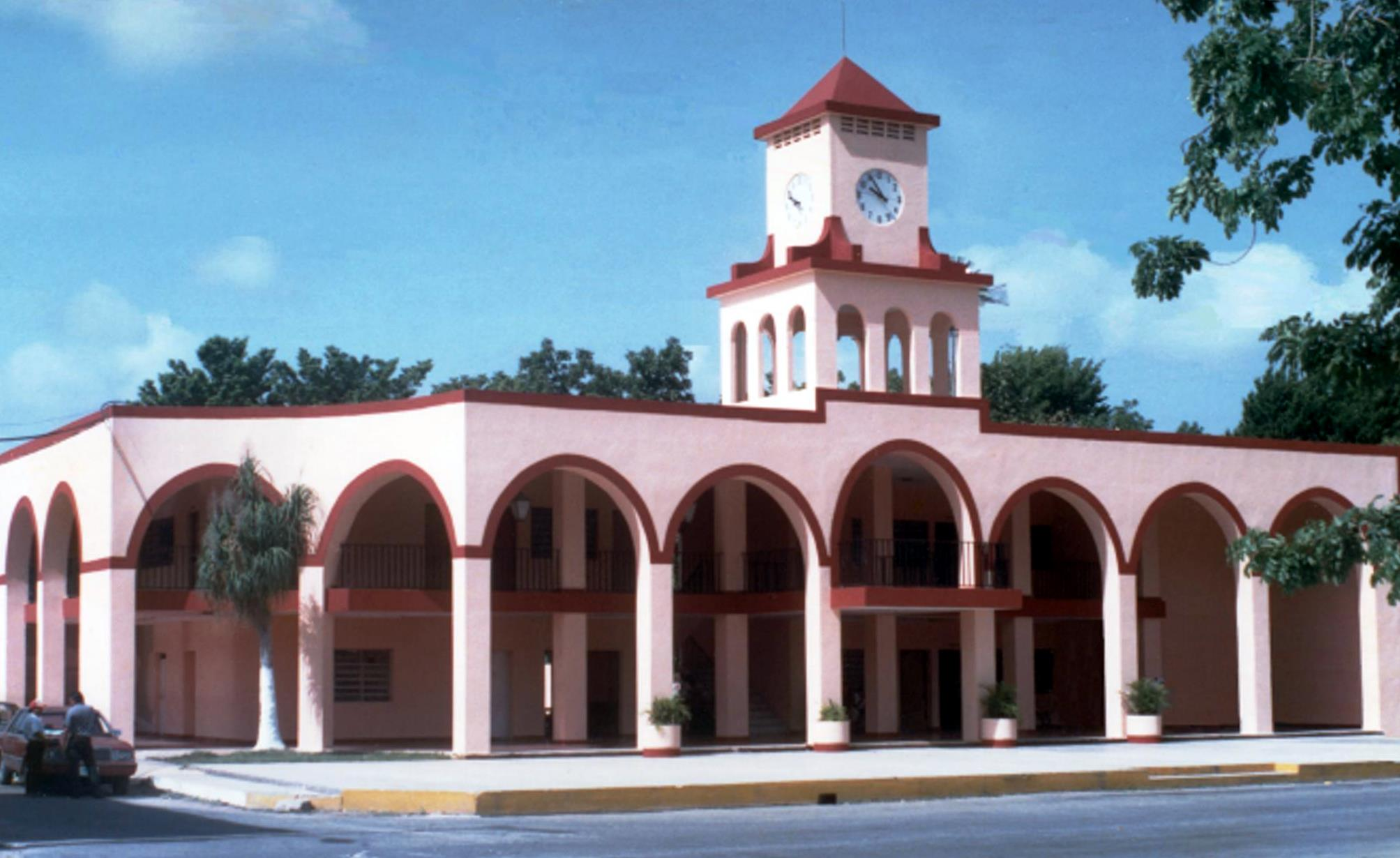
City Council of Telchac Pueblo

The government of the municipality of Telchac Pueblo corresponds to the Ayuntamiento, composed of five council members, the first holds the post of Municipal President and the second the Syndic. Of the five council members, three are elected by relative majority and two by proportional representation; all are elected by direct and secret vote for a period of three years without the possibility of immediate reelection and take office on July 1 of the year in which they are elected.

=== Legislative representation ===
For purposes of the geographical division in state and federal electoral district for the election of deputies, the municipality of Telchac Pueblo is divided as follows:

State:

- IX State Electoral District of Yucatán with headquarters in Progreso.

Federal:

- II Federal Electoral District of Yucatán with headquarters in Progreso.

=== Mayors ===
- 1995 - 1998: Carlos Raúl Jiménez Tamayo
- 1998 - 2001: Juan Tamayo Cab
- 2001 - 2004: José Enrique Ruiz Maldonado
- 2004 - 2007: Manuel Jesús Aguilar Pech
- 2007 - 2010: José Luis Aguilar Cervantes
- 2010 - 2012: Heyder Alfredo Maldonado López

== Gallery ==
Telchac Pueblo

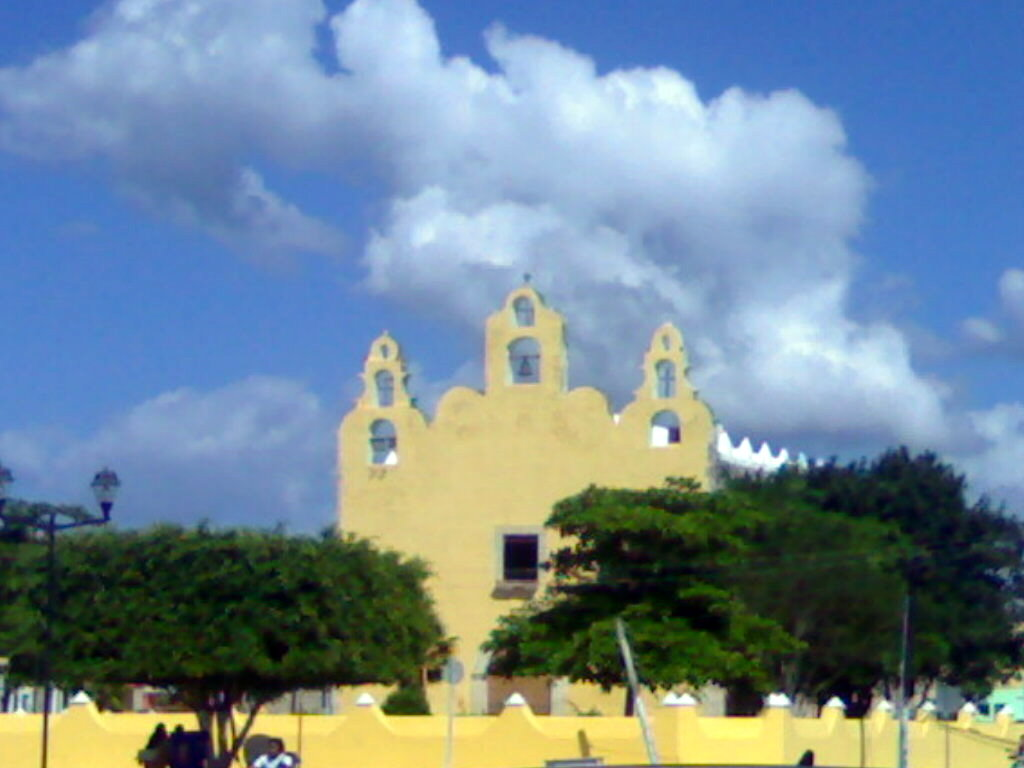
Church to St. Francis of Assisi

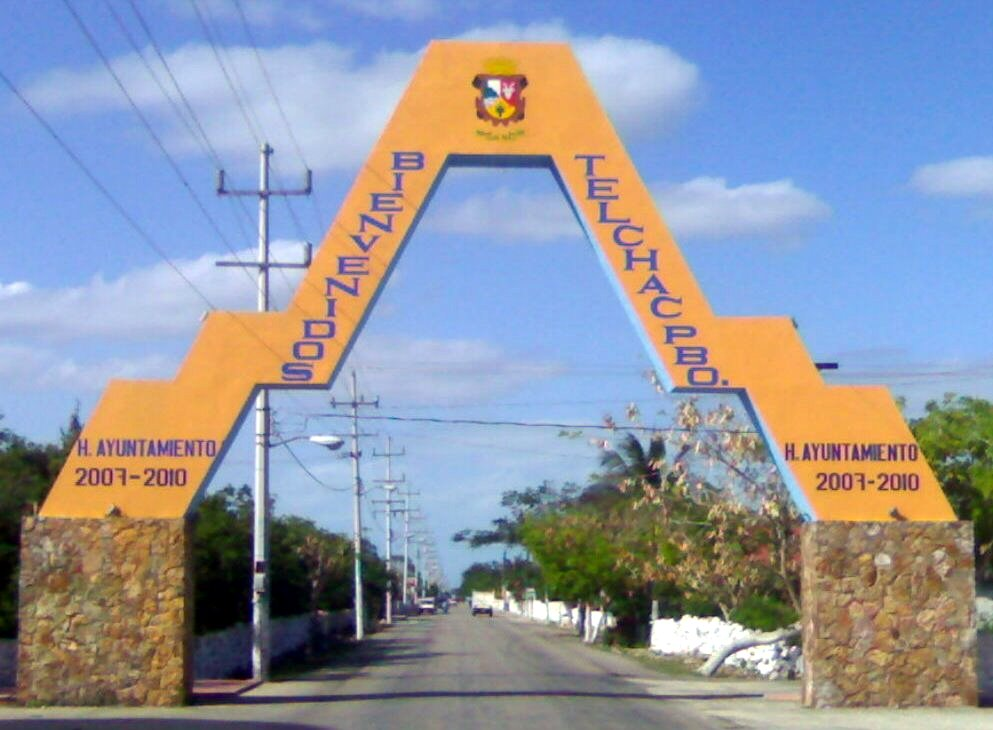
The Mayan Arc

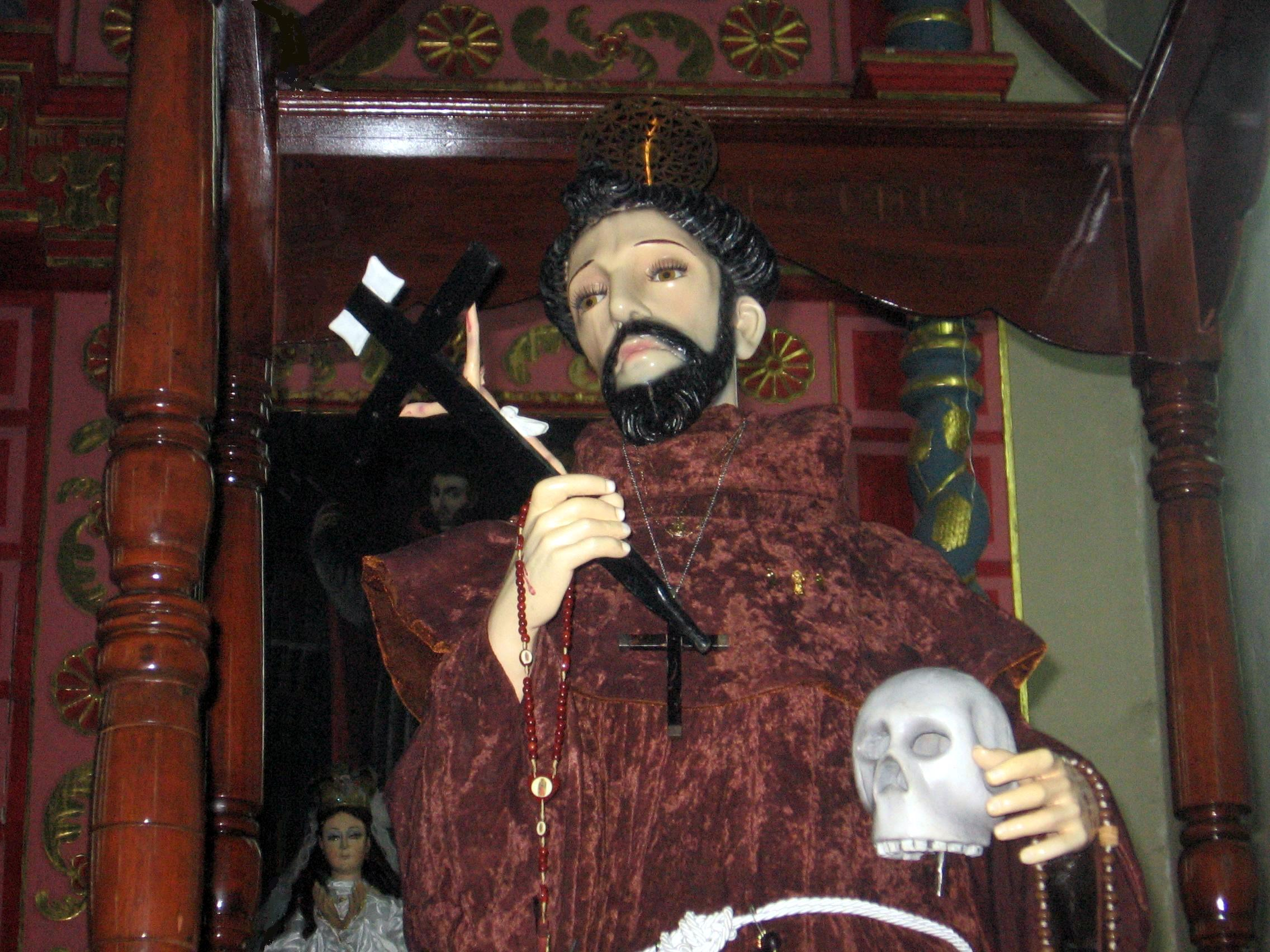
Image of St. Francis of Assisi

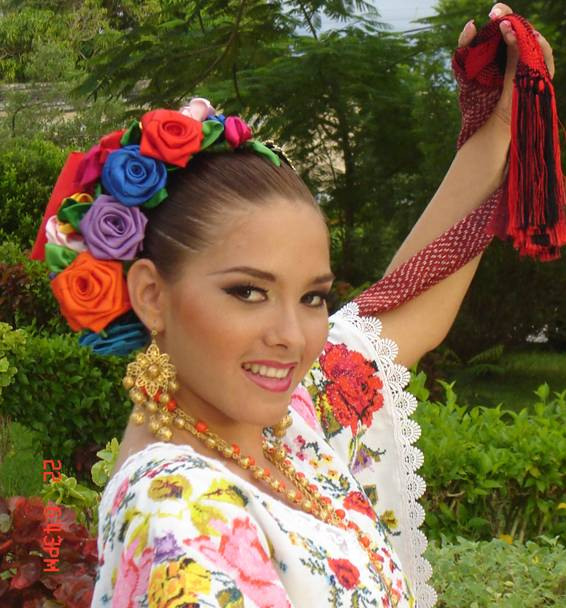
Lizzie Jimenez La flor mas bella of the state 2006

== See also ==
- Governor of Yucatán
- Municipalities of Yucatán
