= Telchac Puerto Municipality =

Municipality in the Mexican state of Yucatán

Telchac Puerto
- Municipality
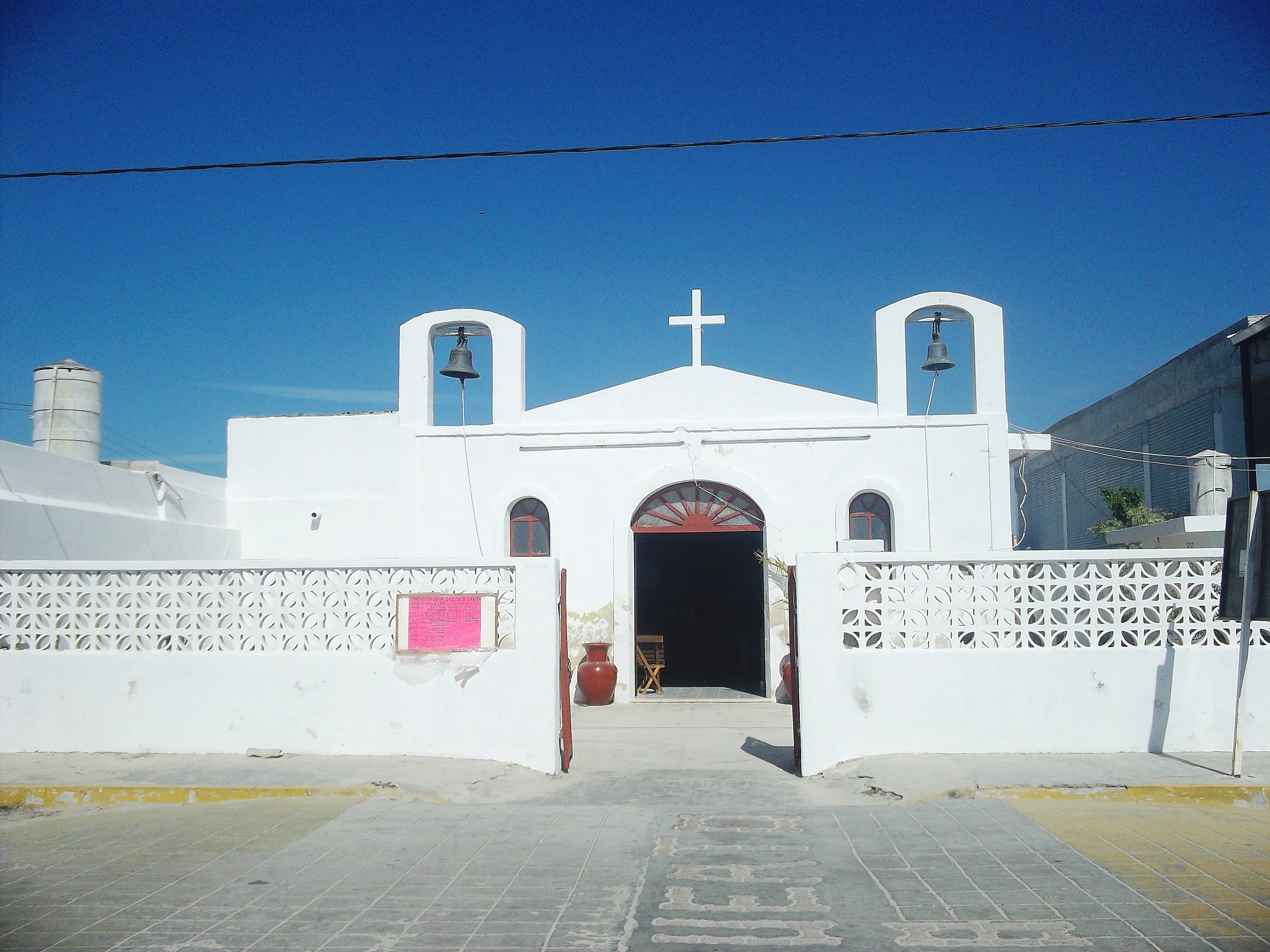
- Principal Church of Telchac Puerto, Yucatán

- Municipal location in Yucatán

- Location of the Municipality in Mexico
- Coordinates: 21°20′26″N 89°15′47″W
- Country: Mexico
- State: Yucatán

Government
  - Type: 2012–2015
  - Municipal President: José Humberto Marrufo Ramírez

Area
  - Total: 173.73 km^{2} (67.08 sq mi)
- Elevation: 1 m (3.3 ft)

Population (2010)
  - Total: 1,726
- Time zone: UTC-6 (Central Standard Time)
- INEGI Code: 083
- Major Airport: Merida (Manuel Crescencio Rejón) International Airport
- IATA Code: MID
- ICAO Code: MMMD

Telchac Puerto Municipality (In the Yucatec Maya Language: “Port of Rain or necessary water”) is a municipality in the Mexican state of Yucatán containing 173.73 square kilometres (67.08 sq mi) of land and located roughly 70 kilometres (43 mi) northeast of the city of Mérida.

== History ==
It is unknown which chieftainship the area was under prior to the arrival of the Spanish. After the conquest the area became part of the encomienda system. Telchac is listed as belonging to the Spanish crown from 1549 to 1607 when Alonso Carrio de Valdés and María de Argüelles Cienfuegos traded it for Sisal and became encomenderos. In 1688 it passed to Ambrosio de Argüelles and in 1698 Eugenia de la Cerda y Figueroa was recorded as encomendara.

Yucatán declared its independence from the Spanish Crown in 1821 and in 1825, the area was assigned to the coastal region with its headquarters in Izamal Municipality. Later it passed to Motul Municipality and in 1927 was part of Telchac Pueblo Municipality. In 1932 it was designated as its own municipality.

== Governance ==
The municipal president is elected for a three-year term. The town council has four councilpersons, who serve as Secretary and councilors of public works, public lighting, and ecology.

The Municipal Council administers the business of the municipality. It is responsible for budgeting and expenditures and producing all required reports for all branches of the municipal administration. Annually it determines educational standards for schools.

The Police Commissioners ensure public order and safety. They are tasked with enforcing regulations, distributing materials and administering rulings of general compliance issued by the council.

== Communities ==
The head of the municipality is Telchac Puerto, Yucatán. The other populated areas of the municipality include Boxactún, San Juan, Santa Barbara and Santa Elena. The significant populations are shown below:

Community	Population
Entire Municipality (2010)	1,726
Telchac Puerto	1618 in 2005

== Local festivals ==
Every year from 29 September to 4 October the town holds a celebration for St. Francis of Assisi.

== Tourist attractions ==
- Church of San Juan de Dios, built in the colonial era
- Archaeological site of Xcambo
- Archaeological site of Misnay

Telchac Puerto port is small but has commercially operating fishing fleets for fishing and packing sardines and for fishing jack crevalle, snook, and spotted seatrout in the lagoon and “jettied pass.” There are also a number of fishing restaurants along the malecon or esplanade on the sea front.

== Lighthouse ==
The port town has light house named Talchar which is off the beach about 55 kilometres (34 mi) away from Progresso. It is a concrete tower of 12 metres (39 ft) height. The tower has four ribs and is fitted with a lantern and gallery. Its active focal plane is also 12 metres (39 ft) and the light gives three white flashes at an interval of 8 seconds.

== Bibliography ==
- Concord, Bruce; Concord, June (2003). Adventure Guide to Yucatan, Cancun and Cozumel. Hunter Publishing, Inc. ISBN 978-1-58843-370-1.
- Shook, Phil (2013). Flyfisher's Guide to Mexico. Wilderness Adventures Press. ISBN 978-1-932098-97-6.
