= Mario Alberto Sulú Canché =

Mexican serial killer

- Born: Mario Alberto Sulú Canché; 1979; Mérida, Yucatán, Mexico
- Died: August 29, 2008 (aged 28–29); Mérida Social Readaptation Center, Mérida, Yucatán, Mexico
- Other names: The Young Girls Killer (Spanish: "El Matachavitas"); Mario Alberto Sulub Canché
- Penalty: 40 years imprisonment

Details
- Victims: 3
- Span of crimes: 2007–2008
- Country: Mexico
- State: Yucatán
- Date apprehended: 4 August 2008

Mario Alberto Sulú Canché (1979 – August 29, 2008), known as The Young Girls Killer (Spanish: El Matachavitas), was a Mexican serial killer who killed three women in rural Mérida, Yucatán between 2007 and 2008. He was sentenced to 40 years imprisonment for these crimes, and later hanged himself in prison.

== Background ==
A native of Mérida, Yucatán, Mario Sulú was a plumber by trade. He was born into a dysfunctional lower-middle-class family and as an adult struggled to keep stable employment, often resorting to stealing. As a teen, Sulú committed various criminal offenses, including theft, sexual harassment, armed robbery and rape. According to some psychiatrists, he might have suffered from antisocial personality disorder.

== Murders ==
Sulú would approach his victims under the pretext of offering them employment at a supermarket, tricking them to get into his car. He then took them to secluded areas, where he began to make sexual advances towards them. When his advances were rejected, Sulú became violent and raped them. Eventually, in an effort to not get caught, he started killing his victims, whose bodies he either dumped in the sea or buried on the roads in isolated areas. He would also take their personal belongings, which he later sold.

His first victim was 15-year-old high school student at COBAY Chenkú, Alma Lucely Canul Ciau, whom he approached as she was leaving school in June 2007. After convincing her to get into his Caribe car, Sulú drove her around Conkal before they found themselves in Chicxulub Pueblo where he attempted to rape her, but Canul retaliated by hitting him with a log and attempting to run away. Angered, he caught up to her, and after a brief struggle, got hold of the log and beat her to death with it. Sulú then grabbed the corpse and threw it into the sea.

In January 2008, while driving towards a bar in Motul to buy a few beers, Sulú noticed a teenage girl, Leydi Marlene Pech Canul, leaving the premises. He then approached her, convincing her to take a tour to Telchac Puerto and San Crisanto. On the way, he stopped in a secluded area where he asked her to have sex with him. When she rejected his advances as well, he beat her into unconsciousness before raping and strangling her. When he was finished, he then buried her body near the highway. Sulú also stole a pair of earrings from her, which he later sold in Mérida.

On July 28, 2008, Sulú left his house and drove to Chicxulub, where he planned to commit some robberies. On the way, he met 25-year-old Guadalupe de los Ángeles Rodríguez Méndez, whom he managed to convince to get into his car. While on the road, Sulú asked her if she had a boyfriend and whether she had sex with him, to which Rodríguez replied in the positive. Shortly after, he stopped the car under the premise of needing to go to the bathroom, but Sulú then grabbed his passenger, binding her hands and feet. During the struggle, Rodríguez begged to be taken back home and for him not to assault her as she was on her period, but Sulú raped her nonetheless. After having his way with her, he strangled Rodríguez with a cable and buried her body in a gap near the Chicxulub-Conkal Highway. Having stolen some valuables from her body, he later sold them for 300 pesos in Monte de Piedad.

== Arrest, sentence and death ==
Due to his lack of organization, Sulú frequently made mistakes, most notable of which was letting numerous witnesses see his first victim board his vehicle. He had also supposedly left his DNA on all of the bodies, but when it came to the very first murder, the salt water from the sea and the advanced state of decomposition rendered it unreliable. Regardless of this, Sulú would be arrested on August 4, 2008, after several witnesses positively identified him as the last person they had seen Alma Canul be with.

Shortly after his arrest, Sulú confessed not only for her death, but to those of the other two victims as well. As a result, he would be convinced in all three and sentenced to 40 years imprisonment. Surprisingly, not long after his conviction, he recanted his guilt in the Pech and Rodríguez killings, claiming the police officers had coerced him into taking the blame. Sulú appealed his sentence, aiming at acquittals in both cases, despite the fact that even if that happened, his sentence would have remained unchanged. On August 29, 2008, his absence was noted during a prisoner roll call, and upon inspecting the bathrooms, prison guards found that Sulú had hanged himself with his own pants.

His body was later interred at the Xoclán cemetery, right next to that of his first victim, and is reportedly visited only by his mother and the two gravediggers.

== See also ==
- List of serial killers by country
