= Artur Podluzhnyi =

Ukrainian racing driver

Podluzhnyi Artur
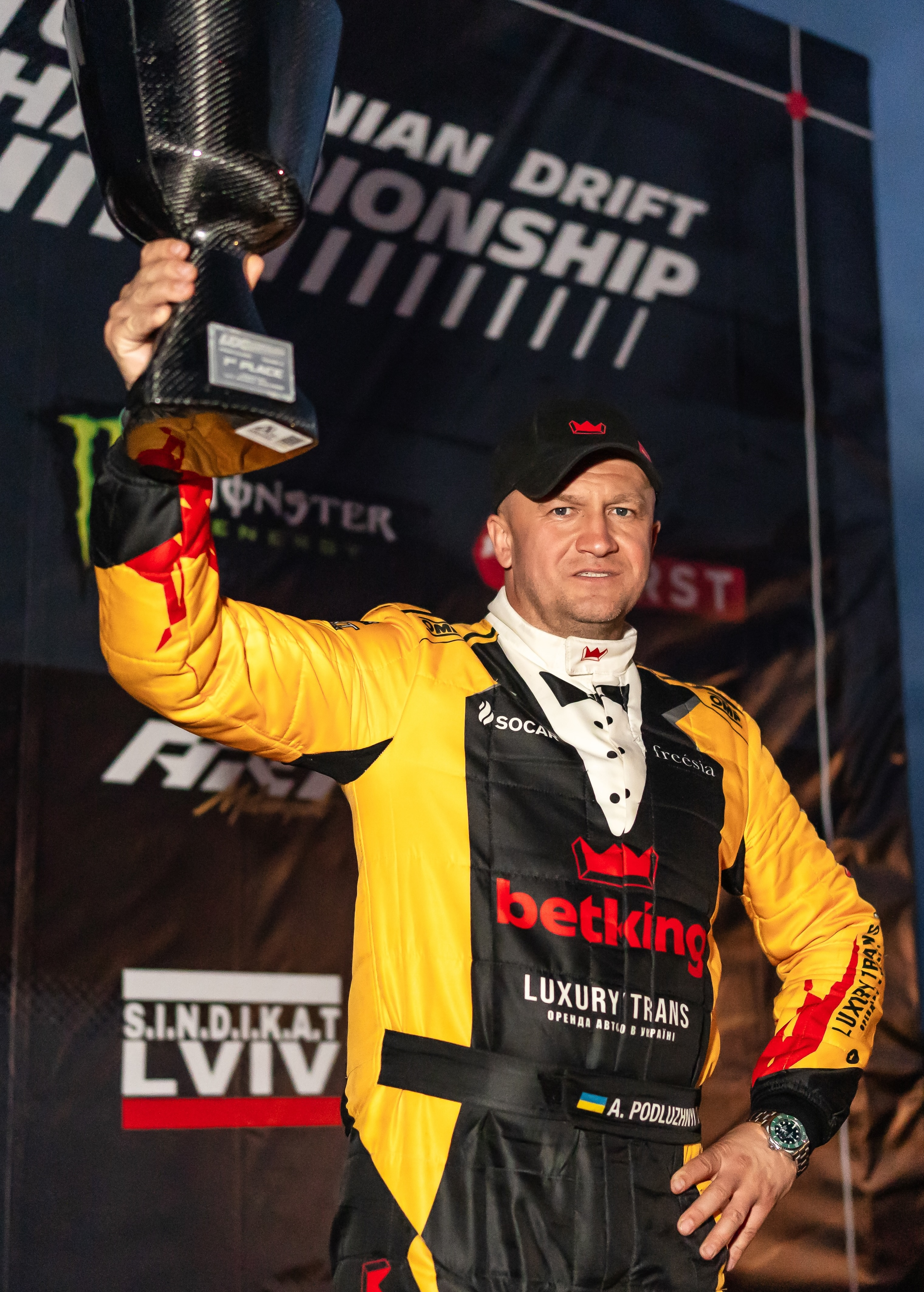
- Born: Artur Yuriyovych Podluzhnyi; January 2, 1988 (age 38); Visaginas, Ignalina District, Lithuanian SSR, Soviet Union
- Citizenship: Ukraine
- Education: National Transport University
- Title: Pro drift pilot

Artur Yuriyovych Podluzhnyi (born 2 January 1988, in Visaginas, Lithuanian SSR) is a leading figure in Ukrainian drifting and a professional racing driver competing in the discipline of drifting. He competes in Ukraine's national series, the Ukrainian Drift Championship (UDC), and chairs the public organization "Ukrainian Association of Auto and Motorsport Athletes" (since 2019). He was the 2019 PRO-AM drifting champion of Ukraine, champion of the 2019 NM Championship, OpenDrift, and Bitlook series, holder of the title "Discovery of the Year in Drift 2019," a 2020 season medalist, and holds the Ukrainian national record for tandem (paired) drifting; he is also a promoter of motorsport in Ukraine.

== Biography ==
He was born into a family of power-industry workers. After the Chernobyl disaster, his parents moved to the town of Sniečkus (now Visaginas), Lithuania, near the Ignalina Nuclear Power Plant, where they were employed at the time.

From childhood he showed an interest in machinery and cars; from age 12 he began helping his father in his garage. At 16 he bought his first motorcycle and became interested in motorsport. In 2006 he moved to Kyiv, where he became a student at the National Transport University (graduating in 2011); around the same time, having professional skills as a mechanic, he took shift work at a Kyiv car dealership. In 2008 he transferred to correspondence (part-time) studies and moved to Pereiaslav-Khmelnytskyi, where he worked as a transport logistics specialist. He subsequently started his own business in car rental and servicing, treating motor and auto racing as a hobby. He founded and owns the company "Luxury Trans" and the car-body repair center "AvtoServis No. 1" in Kyiv.

== Sporting career ==
=== Motorsport ===
He first tried his hand at road racing on motorcycles, and later took up motorsport professionally. In 2013 he took part in an amateur motocross competition in Pyrohiv. He first competed in the professional Ukrainian championship in 2014, taking 2nd place in the "Debut" class and 3rd in the "STK" class (a class for riders on stock motorcycles without tuning that could affect performance). In 2014 he became Ukrainian champion in the STK class, winning all four stages of the championship. That same year he earned the "Master of Sports" title and founded the team M29 (formerly team Nakitel), together with IT specialist Yuriy Marchenko; his teammate was Oleksandr Matsotskyi (2016–2018), with whom he raced as part of M29, after which Artur decided to move into auto racing.

Podluzhnyi was known for consistent results in wet-weather races — on slick surfaces he reliably outpaced his rivals, earning him the nickname 'Rain Man'. Having achieved all his set sporting goals and facing a lack of infrastructure for further development in Ukraine, he moved into auto racing (drifting) in 2019.

=== Auto racing (drifting) ===
To compete in auto racing he acquired a BMW 328 Touring and a Toyota GT86. He spent the winter of 2018–2019 training and took part in the Bitlook Snow Drift 2019 winter cup.

His first professional competition in auto racing was the 2019 UDC (Ukrainian Drift Championship), where he finished in the top 10 among 28 participants. Another achievement that year was 5th place among 36 participants in the PRO class at the EEDC (Eastern Europe Drift Championship, Raubichi, Belarus) (he retired due to a technical issue one step before the final). That year he also competed in the NoMotors championship, winning 4 of 5 stages and clinching the series title early.

In 2020, Artur Podluzhnyi met fellow racing driver Yuriy Rak, with whom he founded the professional team "STO1 Motul Drift Team," which also brought in a third driver, Oleksiy Rak.

In July 2021, at a stage of the Eastern Europe Drift Championship (EEDC) in Belarus, PRO class, Artur was involved in a serious crash after a collision with a competitor — his car was completely destroyed. Despite his injuries (concussion, back, arm, and knee injuries), fault was attributed to the other driver. Within two weeks the team built a new car, and Artur started at the Ukrainian Drift Championship (UDC), finishing 4th among the top drivers of Ukraine and Europe.

The team's achievements for 2020 include 1st place in NoMotors Drift Games and 2nd place in BitLook, as well as an officially registered Ukrainian national record (see below).

Podluzhnyi has repeatedly won qualifying rounds and taken podium places in the NoMotors and BITLOOK championships. Since 2016 he has been a Motul athlete in Ukraine (representing the international brand); in 2019 he became a brand ambassador for the fuel company SOCAR Energy Ukraine (a division of the State Oil Company of Azerbaijan Republic). He competes in a Toyota GT86 prepared for international professional drifting competitions, FIA-homologated, with a 2JZ engine producing 800 hp and a SAMSONAS sequential gearbox. Car number 111.

In 2021–2022 he repeatedly finished on the podium in the Ukrainian championship. Following the start of Russia's full-scale invasion of Ukraine, he entered military service, returning to sport in 2024.

That same year he founded the team SOCAR Drift, which finished 1st in the Ukrainian Cup (5 stages) for the season. In 2025 he built a new car, a BMW E92, with which he won qualifying rounds and individual UDC stages.

In the 2026 season he competed in the PRO2 class of the Ukrainian Drift Championship (UDC). He finished second at the 3rd stage at the Chaika Autodrome and won the 4th stage in Lviv. He went into the final stage second in the overall standings. He finished the season 3rd in the UDC PRO2 championship (799 points) and 2nd in the Ukrainian Cup in the PRO class (186 points).

== Ukrainian national record ==
On 25 November 2020, at the Chaika Autodrome in Kyiv, Artur Podluzhnyi and Yuriy Rak set a Ukrainian national record in tandem (paired) drifting, which required the drivers to enter a controlled slide at maximum speed and then change direction of travel by 180 degrees. The record attempt was twice put at risk: it was originally planned to take place on the runway of Boryspil Airport, but snowfall prevented this; the second attempt, at Chaika, was disrupted by rain during the run, but the drivers went ahead regardless. A representative of the National Register of Records of Ukraine recorded a slide at a speed of 215 km/h, an absolute record for Ukraine (fastest tandem drift).

== Competition results ==
Year	Competition	Position	Notes
2019	NoMotors Championship	1	Championship title
2019	Eastern Europe Drift Championship, Raubichi	5	Retired (technical issue)
2020	Bitlook (qualifying)	2	Qualifying
2020	NoMotors, stage 1	1	Qualifying
2020	NoMotors, stage 3	3	—
2020	Bitlook (season, team)	2	Team placement for the season (among 19 teams)
2020	NoMotors Drift Games (team)	1	Team placement for the season (among 6 teams)
2026	UDC, stage 3 (Chaika, Kyiv)	2	PRO2 class
2026	UDC, stage 4 (Lviv)	1	PRO2 class
2026	Ukrainian Drift Championship (UDC), overall	3	PRO2 class, 799 points
2026	Ukrainian Cup	2	PRO class, 186 points

== Public activities ==
In 2019, together with like-minded colleagues, he initiated the creation of the Association of Auto and Motorsport Athletes of Ukraine and was elected its chairman. The association's founding was preceded by a roundtable meeting to which industry participants were invited to discuss pressing issues in auto and motorsport and to develop proposals for its promotion in Ukraine. Among other goals, the association — which functions as a professional drivers' union — set out to create a single all-Ukrainian championship to expand the geography of competitions. Its interests also include working with drivers and instilling a sporting culture that discourages drifting on public roads.

Advocating for safe drifting that poses no danger to other city residents, Artur Podluzhnyi and colleagues recorded an hour-long interview-format video promoting drifting on dedicated tracks away from city roads. The interview was filmed at the Chaika Autodrome in Kyiv.

Together with colleagues, he took part in an initiative of the international charity SOS Children's Villages, as well as in the charity project "Make a Wish."

In 2026, together with a partner, he took over management of the Feofaniia Autodrome (Kyiv). The autodrome hosts 15 auto and motorcycle schools offering motorcycle riding lessons, car driving lessons, and extreme driving instruction, as well as circuit track days and drift days. The autodrome is open for drift training daily.

The goal of the management is to reconstruct the track: arranging runoff areas, replacing curbs with modern barriers, creating new track configurations, and bringing the infrastructure up to modern safety standards. In the longer term, the plan is to attract patrons and investors to build new autodromes in Ukraine.
