= Motul =

Motul may refer to:

- Motul (company), a French lubricant company
- Motul Municipality, Yucatán, Mexico
  - Motul, Yucatán, a small city in Motul Municipality
- Motul de San José, Guatemalan archaeological site
