= Ucí =

- Town
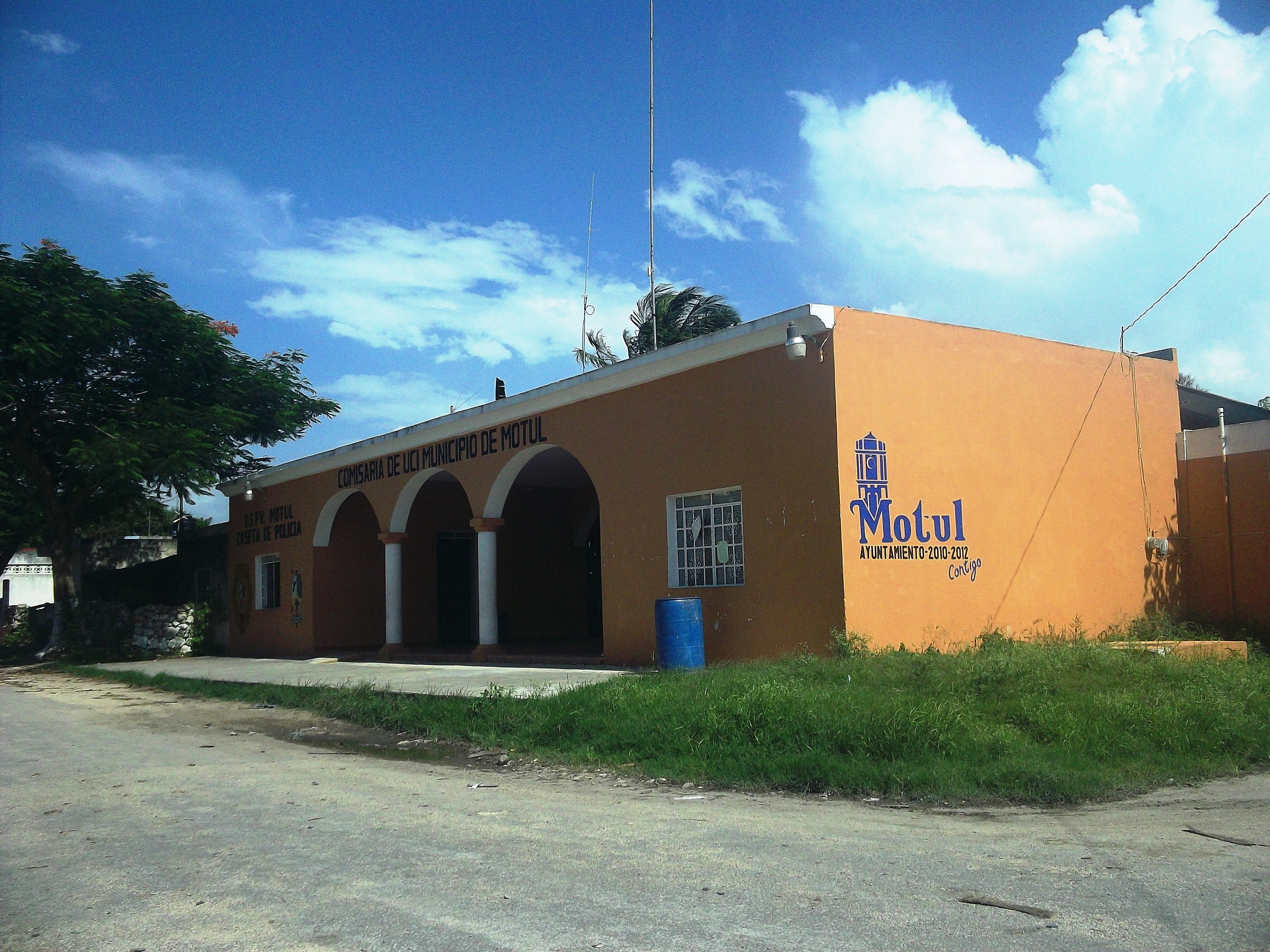

- Location within Yucatán (state)
- Coordinates: 21°07′32″N 89°16′11″W
- Country: Mexico
- State: Yucatán
- Municipality: Motul
- Elevation: 3 m (9.8 ft)

Population (2010)
  - Total: 1,224
- Time zone: UTC-6 (Central Standard Time)
  - Summer (DST): UTC-5 (Central Daylight Time)
- Postal code (of seat): 97436
- Area code: 991
- INEGI code: 310520002

Ucí (Spanish pronunciation: [uˈki]) is a town in the Motul Municipality, Yucatán in Mexico. As of 2010, the town has a population of 5,191.
