= Cacalchén =

- Locality
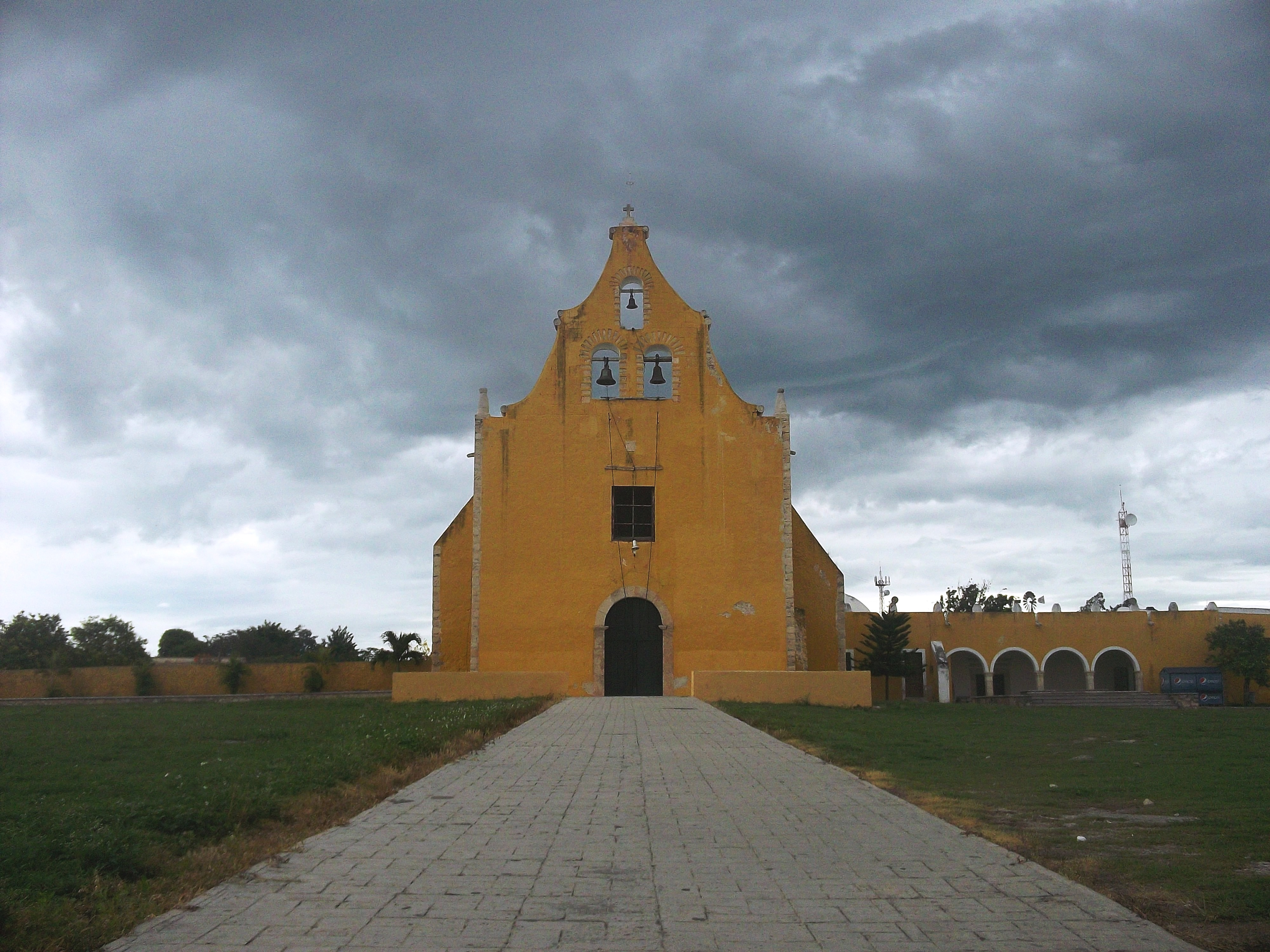
- Principal Church of Cacalchén, Yucatán

- Location of Cacalchén Cacalchén (Mexico)
- Coordinates: 20°58′56″N 89°13′40″W
- Country: Mexico
- State: Yucatán
- Elevation: 10 m (33 ft)

Population (2010)
  - Total: 6,787
- Time zone: UTC-6 (Central Standard Time)
- INEGI Code: 009
- Major Airport: Merida (Manuel Crescencio Rejón) International Airport
- IATA Code: MID
- ICAO Code: MMMD

Cacalchén (In the Yucatec Maya Language: “place of the well with two mouths”) is a locality and the municipal seat of the eponymous Cacalchén Municipality in the Mexican state of Yucatán.

== History ==
There is no extant record of Mayan settlement prior to the conquest. After the conquest the area became part of the encomienda system and Maria Sanchez Sosa was one of the first known encomenderos.

Yucatán declared its independence from the Spanish Crown in 1821 and in 1825, the area was assigned to the coastal region with its headquarters in Izamal. In May 1848 during the Caste War of Yucatán, Cacalchén became a refuge to Colonel José del Carmen Bello after the Mayan rebels defeated government troops and took Izamal. In December of the same year, the Mayan guerrillas commanded by Jacinto Pat looted the town and killed the white settlers.

In 1900, Cacalchén became the municipal seat of the municipality which bears its name.

== Demographics ==
View chart definition.

== Local festivals ==
Every year from 20 to 29 June a celebration is held in honor of the patron saints of the town, St. Peter and St. Paul.

== Tourist attractions ==
- Church of St. Paul dates to the sixteenth century
