= Cacalchén Municipality =

Municipality in Yucatán, Mexico

Cacalchén
- Municipality
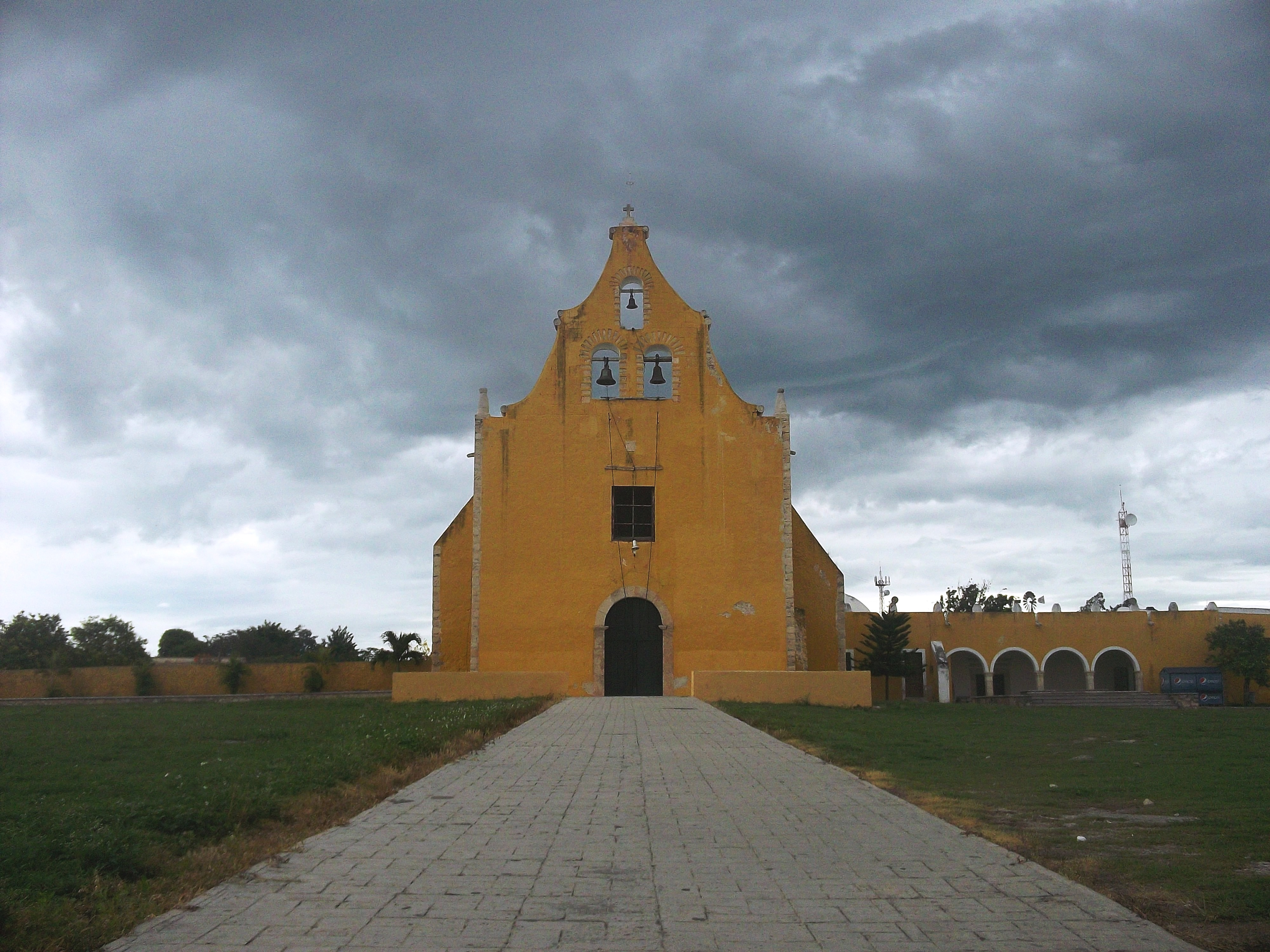
- Principal Church of Cacalchén, Yucatán

- Coat of arms

- Region 4 Litoral centro #007

- Location of the Municipality in Mexico
- Coordinates: 20°58′56″N 89°13′40″W
- Country: Mexico
- State: Yucatán

Government
  - Type: 2012–2015
  - Municipal President: Eiter Georfrey Vazquez Sosa

Area
  - Total: 76.64 km^{2} (29.59 sq mi)
- Elevation: 10 m (33 ft)

Population (2010)
  - Total: 6,811
- Time zone: UTC-6 (Central Standard Time)
- INEGI Code: 009
- Major Airport: Merida (Manuel Crescencio Rejón) International Airport
- IATA Code: MID
- ICAO Code: MMMD

Cacalchén Municipality (In the Yucatec Maya Language: “place of the well with two mouths”) is a municipality in the Mexican state of Yucatán containing 76.64 km^{2} of land and located roughly 40 km east of the city of Mérida.

== History ==
There is no extant record of Mayan settlement prior to the conquest. After the conquest the area became part of the encomienda system and Maria Sanchez Sosa was one of the first known encomenderos.

Yucatán declared its independence from the Spanish Crown in 1821 and in 1825, the area was assigned to the coastal region with its headquarters in Izamal. In May 1848 during the Caste War of Yucatán, Cacalchén became a refuge to Colonel José del Carmen Bello after the Mayan rebels defeated government troops and took Izamal. In December of the same year, the Mayan guerrillas commanded by Jacinto Pat looted the town and killed the white settlers.

In 1900 it was withdrawn and became head of the municipality which bears its name.

== Governance ==
The municipal president is elected for a three-year term. The town council has seven aldermen who serve as councilors for public works, public services, ecology, parks, public sanitation, nomenclature and cemeteries.

== Communities ==
The head of the municipality is Cacalchén, Yucatán. The other populated areas in the municipality are Catzín, Puhá, Sahcabá and San Antonio. The significant populations are shown below:

Community	Population
Entire Municipality (2010)	6,811
Cacalchén	6399 in 2005

== Local festivals ==
Every year from 20 to 29 June a celebration is held in honor of the patron saints of the town, St. Peter and St. Paul.

== Tourist attractions ==
- Church of St. Paul dates to the sixteenth century
- Hacienda Dzidzilché
