= Felipe Carrillo Puerto, Oaxaca =

Suburb of Santa Lucia del Camino, Oaxaca, Mexico

Felipe Carrillo Puerto is a suburb/town in Santa Lucía del Camino in the Mexican state of Oaxaca, named after the politician Felipe Carrillo Puerto.

One of its residents, Pedro Carmona was alleged to be the person who shot dead Indymedia New York City journalist Bradley Roland Will on October 27, 2006.
