= Felipe Carrillo Puerto =

Mexican politician (1874-1924)

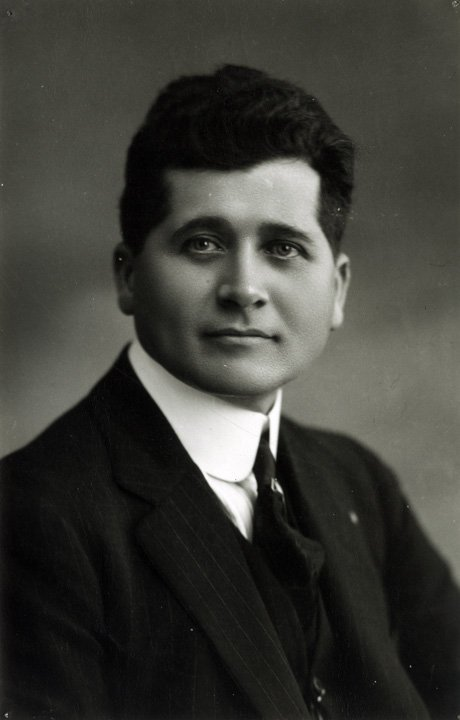
- Carrillo Puerto in 1918

Governor of Yucatán
- In office 1 February 1922 – 3 January 1924
- Preceded by: Manuel Berzunza
- Succeeded by: Juan Ricardez Broca

Personal details
- Born: November 8, 1874 Motul, Yucatán
- Died: January 3, 1924 (aged 49) Mérida, Yucatán
- Manner of death: Assassination by shooting
- Party: Socialist Party of the Southeast
- Spouse(s): Isabel Palma (wife); Alma Reed (fiancée)
- Profession: newspaper owner, El Heraldo (in Motul)

Felipe Santiago Carrillo Puerto (8 November 1874 – 3 January 1924) was a Mexican journalist, politician and revolutionary who served as the governor of Yucatán from 1922 until his assassination in 1924. He became known for his efforts at reconciliation between the Yucatec Maya and the Mexican government after the Caste War.

== Prerevolution and personal life ==
Carrillo Puerto was born in the town of Motul, Yucatán, 45 km northeast of Mérida, and was of partly indigenous Maya background; he was rumored to be a descendant of the Nachi Cocom dynasty of Mayapan. His parents were the merchant Justiniano Carrillo Pasos and his wife Adelaide Puerto Solis. He was one of fourteen children, thirteen of whom lived into adulthood. Although his family were Spanish speakers, he also grew up speaking Maya (Mayathan), the language of the neighborhood children.

He was a socialist who favored land reform, women's suffrage, and rights for the indigenous Maya people. As a teenager during the Caste War, he was briefly imprisoned for urging the Maya people to tear down a fence that had been built by the large landowners around lands in the community of Dzununcán to keep the Maya out. He obtained work on the local railways (known as tramways), joined the railway workers union, and married Isabel Palma.

Carrillo Puerto then began publishing and editing El Heraldo de Motul, which was briefly closed down in 1907 by the authorities for "insulting public officials". In the Yucatán gubernatorial election of 1909, Carrillo Puerto supported the candidacy of the poet Delio Moreno Cantón in the three-way race against the Antirreeleccionista Party's (Maderista's) José María Pino Suárez, and the pro-Díaz Enrique Muñoz Arístegui. Arístegui was announced as the winner in what is generally considered to have been a fraudulent tally. In 1910 he attended the Third Congress of the Associated Press of the States (Congreso de la Prensa Asociada de los Estados) in Mexico City and spearheaded a resolution to free the political prisoners being held at San Juan de Ulúa; a resolution that President Díaz acceded to. In 1912, he went to work as a reporter and columnist for the periodical Revista de Mérida run by his friend and colleague Carlos R. Menéndez.

He married María Isabel Palma in 1901. They had six children. In 1923, he had a romance with a United States journalist, Alma Reed of San Francisco, California, which was commemorated in the song commissioned by him: "Peregrina", written by the poet Luis Rosado de la Vega and the composer Ricardo Palmerín.

== As governor ==
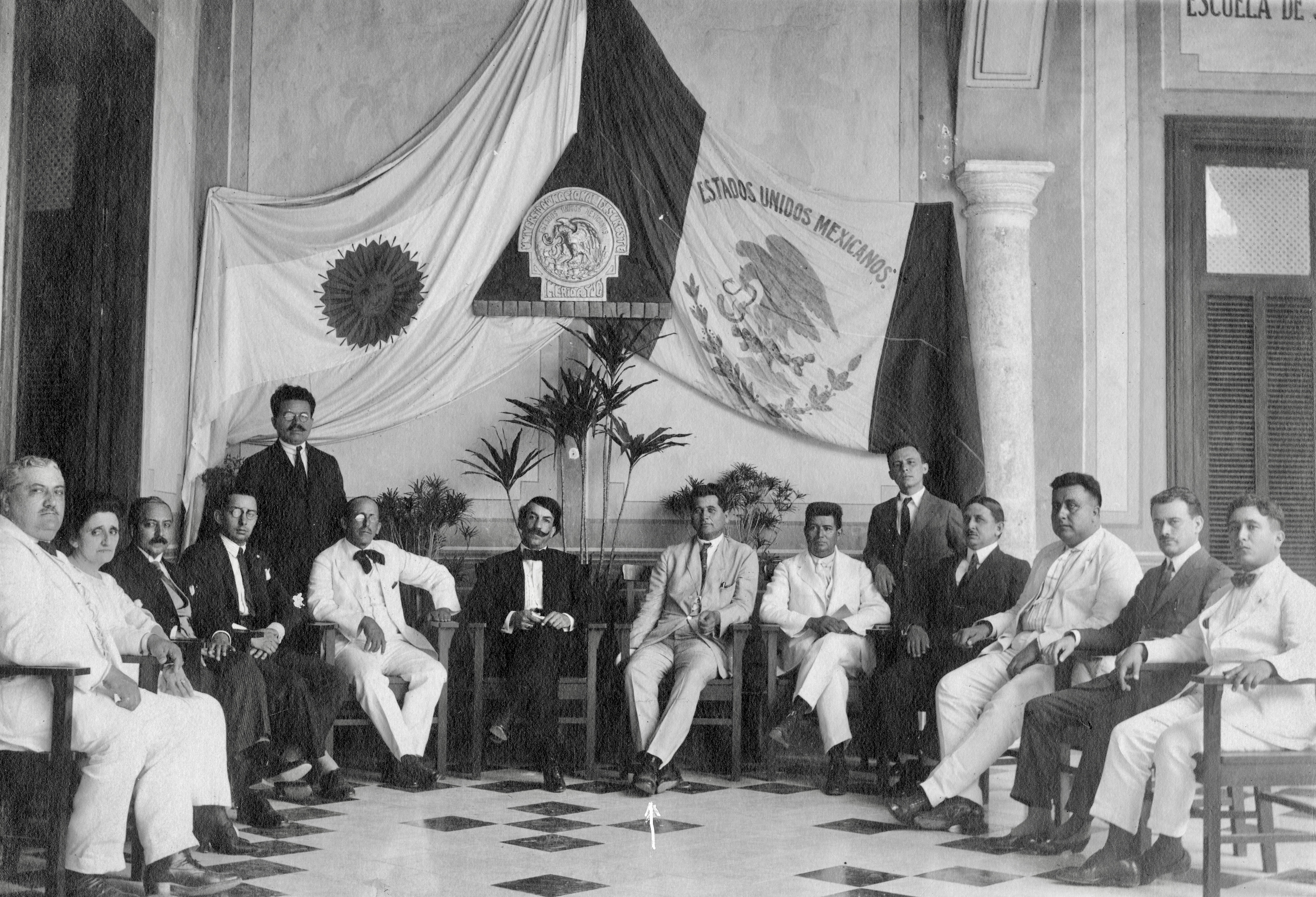
Carrillo Puerto (seated, sixth from right) with his deputies and Argentine politician Alfredo Palacios (on his right) in 1923.

Carrillo Puerto's candidacy for governor was supported by the Partido Socialista del Sureste (Spanish: Socialist Party of the Southeast). On 1 February 1922, Carrillo Puerto took the oath of office and made his first speech as governor, and did so in the Maya language. He promised to respect and enforce the Federal Constitution, as well as the resolutions adopted by the Workers' Congress of Motul and Izamal. He proclaimed the "first socialist government in the Americas". During his 20 months as governor, Carrillo Puerto initiated land reform, confiscating large estates and returning land to the native Maya. He promoted new farming techniques, granted women political rights, began family planning programs, fought against alcoholism, and fought for the conservation and restoration of the pre-Columbian Maya archaeological sites. In the first year of his administration 417 public schools were opened.

On 25 February 1922 he founded the Universidad Nacional del Sureste, now called the Universidad Autónoma de Yucatán (UADY).

Carrillo Puerto was not a supporter of the Adolfo de la Huerta rebellion against President Álvaro Obregón, and General Plutarco Elías Calles. As a result, he was captured by rebel army officers, tried by a military tribunal, and executed by a firing squad on 3 January 1924, along with three of his brothers, Wilfrido, Benjamin, and Edesio, and eight of their friends.

== Legacy ==
Felipe Carrillo Puerto was called the "Red Dragon with the Eyes of Jade" ("El Dragón Rojo de los Ojos de Jade") by his enemies and the "Apostle of the Bronze Race" ("Apóstol de la raza de bronce") by those who loved him.

The movie Peregrina regarding his life was made in 1974 starring Antonio Aguilar. The towns of Felipe Carrillo Puerto, Nayarit, Felipe Carrillo Puerto, Quintana Roo (formerly Santa Cruz de Bravo), Felipe Carrillo Puerto, Michoacan, Felipe Carrillo Puerto, Oaxaca and Motul de Carrillo Puerto were named in his honor.

Tulum International Airport was named after him and started operations on December 1, 2023. During the inauguration, President Andrés Manuel López Obrador declared that 2024 would be the "year of Felipe Carrillo Puerto" (Spanish: año de Felipe Carrillo Puerto). López Obrador later formally submitted this proposal to congress, and it entered into force on 1 January 2024.

Preceded by Manuel Berzunza	Governor of Yucatán; 1922–1924	Succeeded by Juan Ricardez Broca
