= Yaxkukul Municipality =

Municipality in the Mexican state of Yucatán

Yaxkukul
- Municipality
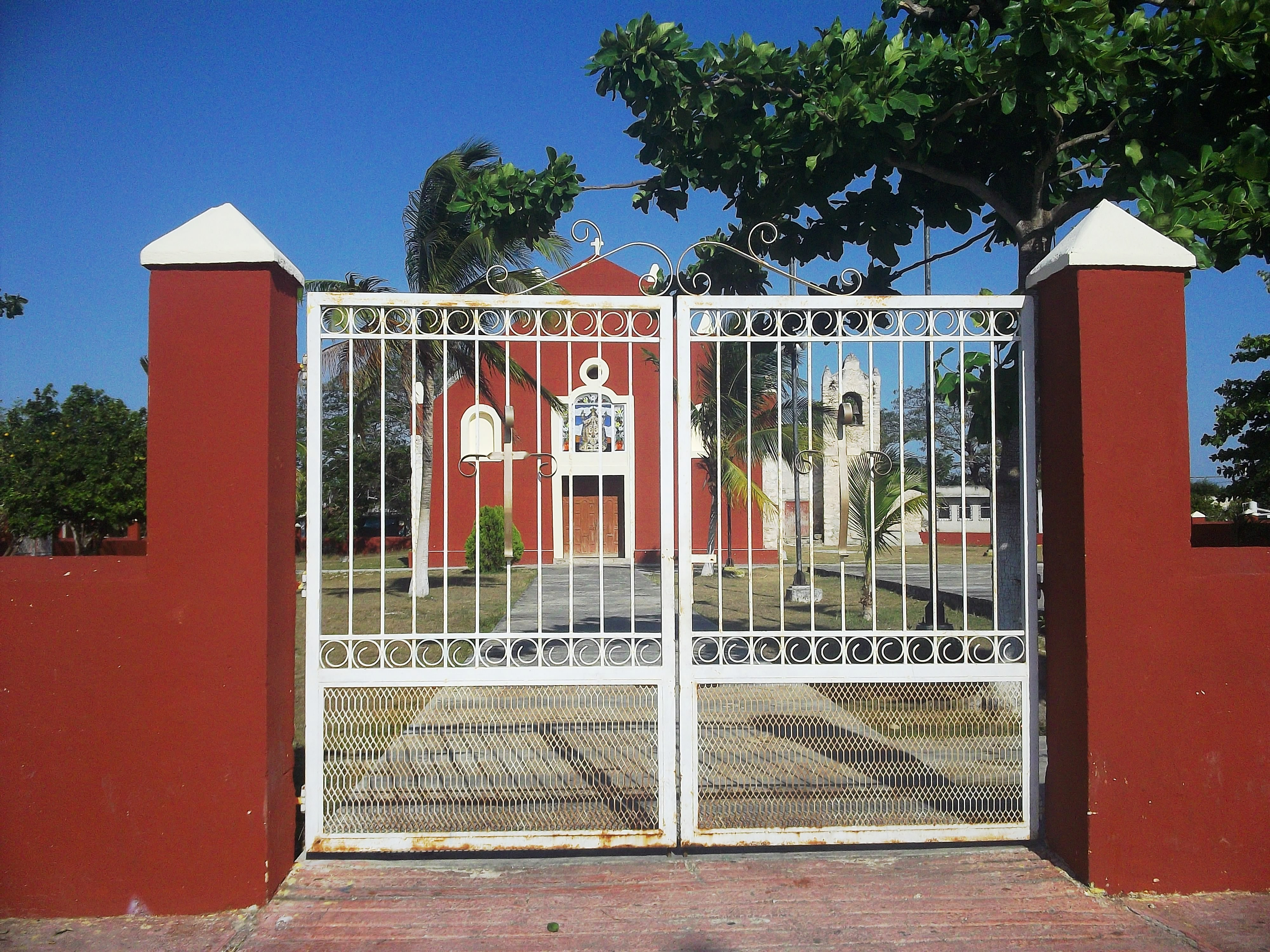
- Principal Church of Yaxkukul, Yucatán

- Municipal location in Yucatán

- Location of the Municipality in Mexico
- Coordinates: 21°03′42″N 89°25′12″W
- Country: Mexico
- State: Yucatán

Government
  - Type: 2012–2015
  - Municipal President: Jesús Delfino May Tun

Area
  - Total: 43.43 km^{2} (16.77 sq mi)
- Elevation: 8 m (26 ft)

Population (2010)
  - Total: 2,868
- Time zone: UTC-6 (Central Standard Time)
- INEGI Code: 105
- Major Airport: Merida (Manuel Crescencio Rejón) International Airport
- IATA Code: MID
- ICAO Code: MMMD

Yaxkukul Municipality (in the Yucatec Maya language: "where he first worships God") is a municipality in the Mexican state of Yucatán, containing 43.43 kilometres (26.99 mi) of land and located roughly 25 kilometres (16 mi) northeast of the city of Mérida. Survey maps of Yaxkukul cite its full name as "Santa Cruz de Mayo Yaxkukul".

== History ==
It is unknown which chieftainship the area was under prior to the arrival of the Spanish. An ancient tradition is that a prince from Zaci (now Valladolid) sent a scouting party, which founded a town at the site. After the conquest, the area became part of the encomienda system. In 1607 the encomienda of Nabalam was joined with Yaxkukul, still later Yaxkukul was joined with Tahcab, and in 1667 was granted to the encomendero Francisco Menéndez Morán.

Yucatán declared its independence from the Spanish Crown in 1821 and in 1825, the area was assigned to the coastal region with its headquarters in Izamal Municipality. Still later, it passed to the Tixkokob Municipality and in 1918, was designated as its own municipality.

Yucatán architecture evolved in towns like Yaxkukul, Tixpehual, and Euan on the "preconquest platform foundation" and in the sixteenth century the features of churches consisted of an open view of chapel, the elongated nave and facade of espadana which finally "complemented these buildings in the eighteenth century".

== Governance ==
The municipal president is elected for a three-year term. The town council has seven councilpersons, who serve as secretary and councilors of public works, ecology, public monuments, and nomenclature.

== Communities ==
The head of the municipality is Yaxkukul, Yucatán. The other populated areas of the municipality include Hacienda Chac-Abal, San Francisco, San Juan de las Flores, Santa Cruz Canto and Yaxcopoil. The significant populations are shown below:

Community	Population
Entire municipality (2010)	2,868
San Francisco	22 in 2005
San Juan de las Flores	20 in 2005
Yaxkukul	2610 in 2005

== Local festivals ==
Every year from 16 January to 10 February the town holds a celebration for the Virgin of Candelaria.

== Tourist attractions ==
- Church of Candelaria, built in the eighteenth century
- Hacienda Chac-Abal
- Hacienda San Juan de las Flores

== Bibliography ==
- Edgerton, Samuel Y.; Lara, Jorge Pérez de (2001). Theaters of Conversion: Religious Architecture and Indian Artisans in Colonial Mexico. UNM Press. ISBN 978-0-8263-2256-2.
- Wachte, Nathan l; Andes, Centre de recherches sur le Mexique, l'Amérique centrale et les (1996). Le nouveau monde, mondes nouveaux: l'expérience américaine : actes du colloque organisé par le CERMACA (EHESS/CNRS), Paris, 2, 3 et 4 juin 1992. Éd. Recherche sur les civilisations. ISBN 978-2-86538-255-2.
