= Felipe Carrillo Puerto, Michoacán =

Coordinates: 19.1638°N 102.7077°W

Felipe Carrillo Puerto Michoacán is a town in the Municipality of Buenavista in the Mexican state of Michoacán.
Also known as "La Ruana". Its population is about 9,607 people. It's located in the hot Tierra Caliente valley.
Nearby towns include El Crucero, El 18, Tepalcatepec, Buena Vista, Santa Ana and the city of Apatzingan.

Recently most of its streets have been paved. It has a Catholic church with a nun-run school, a plaza with a kiosk in center. Families are very tied down and their nationalities run back to many years. Those families that were the first to become part of "La Ruana" are the: Ayala, Figueroa, Calderon, Beltran, Valencia, Godinez, Mendoza, Torres, Quintero, Rodriguez, Villa, Cisneros, Garcia, Ochoa, Capilla, Bonilla, and Fernandez.

Most of the jobs there are in agriculture such as lemons, grapefruit and bananas.
But it is also known that many members of the 'Familia Michoacana' hold hospitality there.
There are many mosquitoes from the hot, humid weather and all the agriculture around it.
Local transportation include vehicles and mopeds,
Teenagers are known to rule the city, as they are allowed to drive at any age and their parents have strong power over the government. Quads are seen more than cars "cruising" around. On the highway that connects to other towns there are buses that go by and taxi cabs.
