= Telchac Puerto =

Town in the Mexican state of Yucatán

Coordinates: 21°21′N 89°16′W

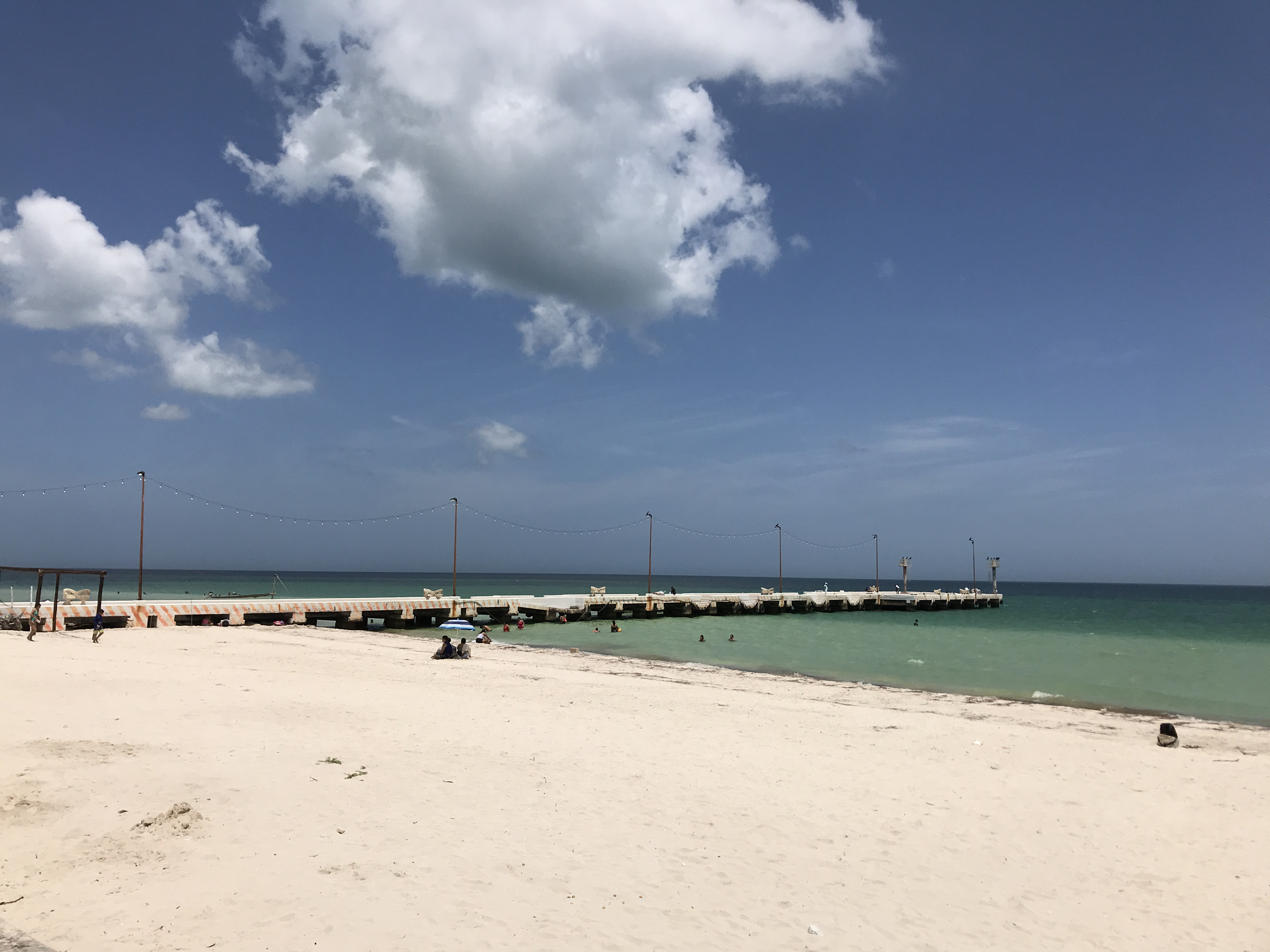
Beach and dock in Telchac Puerto.

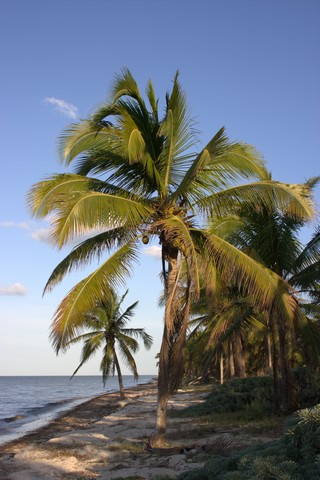
Telchac Puerto Beach View.

Telchac Puerto is a port town in the Yucatan. It is located about one hour north east of the city of Mérida (65 kilometers) and 30 minutes from Progreso.

== Dining ==
A bakery and several seafood restaurants are in Telchac Puerto. Fried fish stands, a tortilla restaurant, and restaurants serving ceviche, fried fish, shrimp cocktails, and fish fillets are also available.

== Recreation ==
There is town plaza, a park with a children's play area and a lighthouse on the small seaside promenade. Three miles west of Telchac Puerto, inland, are the Mayan temples of Xcambo.

During July and August, a fair is in place in the main plaza with booths offering foods, knick-knacks and mechanical rides.

== Patron saint ==
The Patron saint of Telchac is San Diego de Alcala. Celebratory festivities are held in November.

== General information ==
- Population (in 2000): 1,594
- Area code: 991
- Weather: Warm and Humid. Rain in summer (June–August). Cold fronts in winter (November–January).

Very quiet fishing village with many houses for rent. Low season is January to April, mostly tourists from North America occupy villas. During summer time which is high season, tourists escape the tremendous heat in Mérida in favor of the cooler coastal breeze. Prices for villas double in the summer. Many property opportunities. The beach which is part of the northern Yucatan peninsula faces northerly winds in the winter; as such the beachfront is mostly covered with white sand. Population is quite friendly.

A new marina/yacht club is now under construction in Telchac Puerto. The development will include a first-class marina, commercial and residential properties. Other residential developments are under construction both on the beach and within walking distance to the beach.

== Climate ==
Climate data for Telchac Puerto
Month	Jan	Feb	Mar	Apr	May	Jun	Jul	Aug	Sep	Oct	Nov	Dec	Year
Mean daily maximum °C (°F)	28.2 (82.8)	29.2 (84.6)	31.4 (88.5)	33.0 (91.4)	33.7 (92.7)	33.0 (91.4)	32.4 (90.3)	32.4 (90.3)	32.3 (90.1)	31 (88)	30 (86)	28.6 (83.5)	31.3 (88.3)
Mean daily minimum °C (°F)	18.5 (65.3)	18.7 (65.7)	19.8 (67.6)	21.0 (69.8)	22.3 (72.1)	23 (73)	22.7 (72.9)	23 (73)	22.6 (72.7)	22 (72)	21.0 (69.8)	19.3 (66.7)	21 (70)
Average precipitation mm (inches)	30 (1.2)	33 (1.3)	13 (0.5)	15 (0.6)	36 (1.4)	94 (3.7)	61 (2.4)	61 (2.4)	120 (4.9)	76 (3)	28 (1.1)	28 (1.1)	600 (23.5)
Source: Weatherbase
