= Motul, Yucatán =

Small city in the Mexican state of Yucatán

Motul
- City
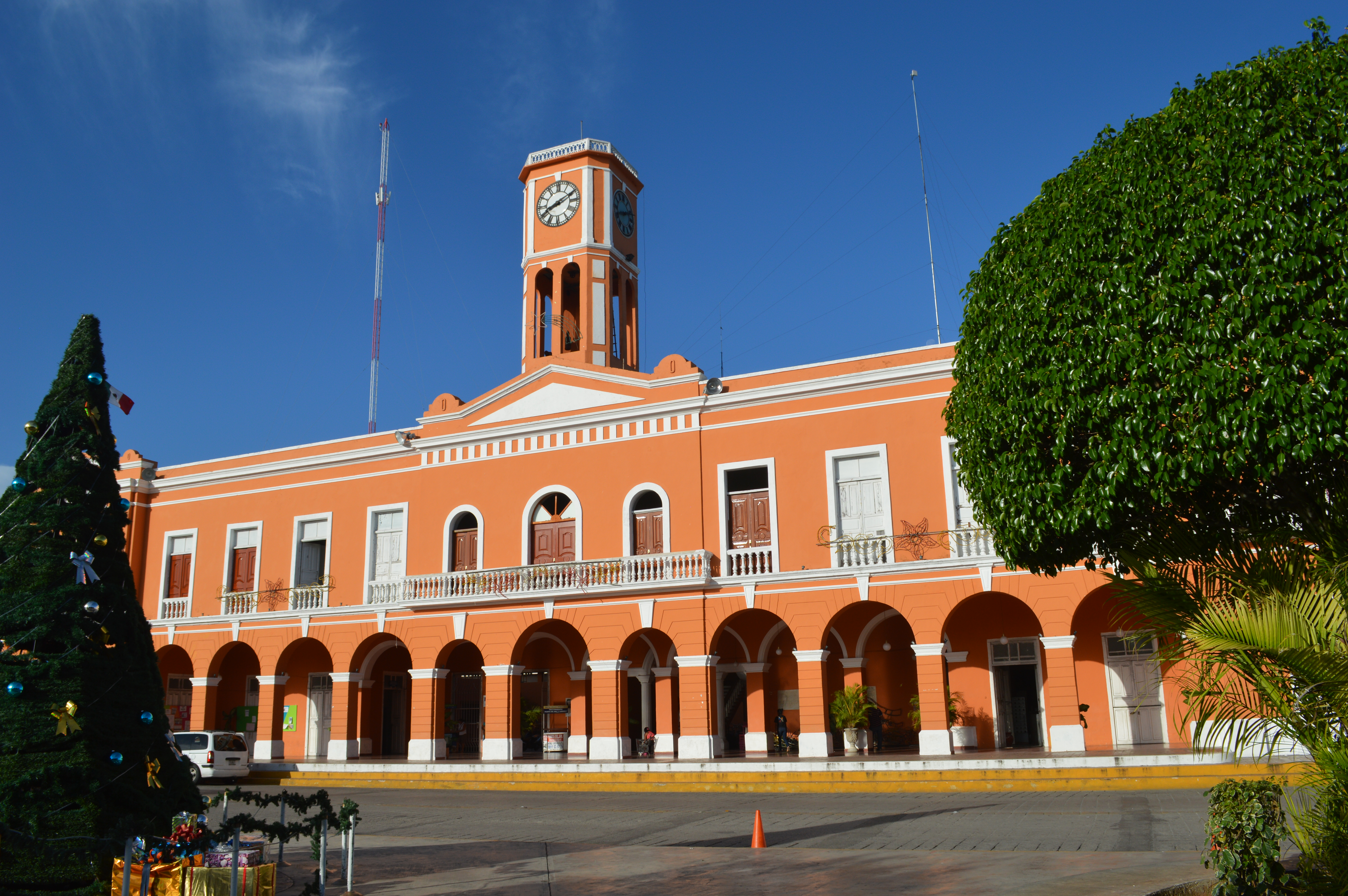
- Municipal palace

- Coat of arms

- Location within Yucatán (state) Location within Mexico
- Coordinates: 21°10′0″N 89°28′0″W
- Country: Mexico
- State: Yucatán
- Municipality: Motul
- Founded: 1050
- Granted City Status: 1872

Population (2005)
  - Total: 21,508
- Demonym: Motulen
- Time zone: UTC-6 (Central Standard Time)
- Postal Code: 97430
- Area code: 991
- INEGI Code: 052
- Website: Official Site

Motul (from Mayan: Mutul: toponymic, "the 'mut' bird"; it can also mean "knot"), officially Motul de Carrillo Puerto, is the capital city of the municipality of Motul located in the central coastal region of the Mexican state of Yucatán, at an approximate distance of 45 kilometers northeast of the city of Mérida, the capital of the entity. According to the 2020 INEGI census, the city has just over 26 thousand inhabitants. The city is famous for being the place of origin of Motuleños eggs, a typical traditional dish of Yucatan cuisine. The official name of the city pays tribute to former governor Felipe Carrillo Puerto, originally from Motul, who was an important figure for the state at the beginning of the 20th century for his fight against the exploitation of the Mayan people.

In 2023, Motul was designated a Pueblo Mágico by the Mexican government, recognizing its cultural and historical importance.

== History ==
Motul was a site of the Pre-Columbian Maya civilization, said to have been founded in the 11th century by a priest named Zac Mutul. The city was ruled by the Pech family. After the fall of Yucatán's central government in Mayapan in the 1440s, the Pech ruled a regional kingdom called Cehpech with its capital in Motul.

With the Spanish conquest of Yucatán, Conquistador Francisco de Montejo made Motul a Spanish colonial town. Motul has a Spanish colonial era Franciscan monastery with interesting frescos.

Motul was granted the status of a city on 22 February 1872.

Motul was the birthplace of Felipe Carrillo Puerto, a former Governor of Yucatán who was assassinated in 1924. In his honor, the formal name of the city of Motul was changed to Motul de Carrillo Puerto.

Motul is known as the place of origin of the popular dish huevos motuleños (eggs Motul style).

== Location ==
Motul is located in the central region of the State and borders to the north with the municipalities of Telchac Pueblo and Dzemul; to the south with Cacalchén; to the east with Cansahcab and to the west with Baca.

It is in the central place of the region known as the henequen zone of Yucatán, having located in the city important manufacturing centers of the henequen agroindustry during the time of Cordemex, a parastatal company that concentrated the activity towards the end of the last century.

== Traditional holidays ==
The guilds in Motul are part of the customs and traditions. For Catholics, the festival begins on July 1 with the traditional mañanitas and the descent of the Virgin of Carmen who at 4:00 in the morning walks through the main streets of the city center, then returns and is placed on an altar. especially inside the ecclesiastical nave.

The participating unions are:

- July 1: Downhill Guild.
- July 2: Ladies and Young Ladies Guild.
- July 3: Guadalupe Guild, faith and hope.
- July 4: Half-Blood Guild #1.
- July 5: Guild of Day Laborers and Farmers.
- July 6: Drivers Guild.
- July 7: Guild of Tanners, Shoemakers and Millers.
- July 8: Bakers Guild.
- July 9: Guild of Builders.
- July 10: Carpenters Guild.
- July 11: Guild of mechanics, blacksmiths and drivers.
- July 12: Mixed Guild.
- July 13: Suppliers Guild.
- July 14: Guild of Faith, Hope and Charity.
- July 15: Guild of Ladies and Young Ladies #1, at night after the burning of the pyrotechnics, the traditional dairy is held.
- July 16: Half-Blood Guild #2. That same day, a procession is held to the Virgen del Carmen in which thousands of believers gather and join in the celebration.
- July 17: Peasant Guild July 18: Guild of youth groups.
- July 19: Guild symbol of divine justice.
- July 20: Guild of Peace and Union.
- July 21: Peasant Youth Guild.
- July 22: Guild of young people, gentlemen, ladies and ladies.
- July 23: Guild union of youth and children and closing of the Virgin.

== Localities belonging to the municipality ==
Within the municipal jurisdiction, in addition to the capital, 8 towns considered important are included: Kiní, Mesatunich, Sacapuc, Timul, Ucí.

Other localities, although with a smaller number of inhabitants, are: Kambul, Kancabal, Kamcapchén, Komchén Martínez, Kopté, Rogelio Chalé, Sabacnah, Sakolá, San Antonio Dzinah, San Pedro Cámara, San Pedro Chacabal, San Rafael, San Antonio, San Roque, Santa Cruz Pachón, Santa Teresa, Tanyá, Tekal, Texán Espejo, Ticopó Gutiérrez, Uitzil, Haceh, Hacienda Marco and Rancho Kamcapchén.
