= Motul Municipality =

Municipality in the Mexican state of Yucatán

Motul
- Municipality
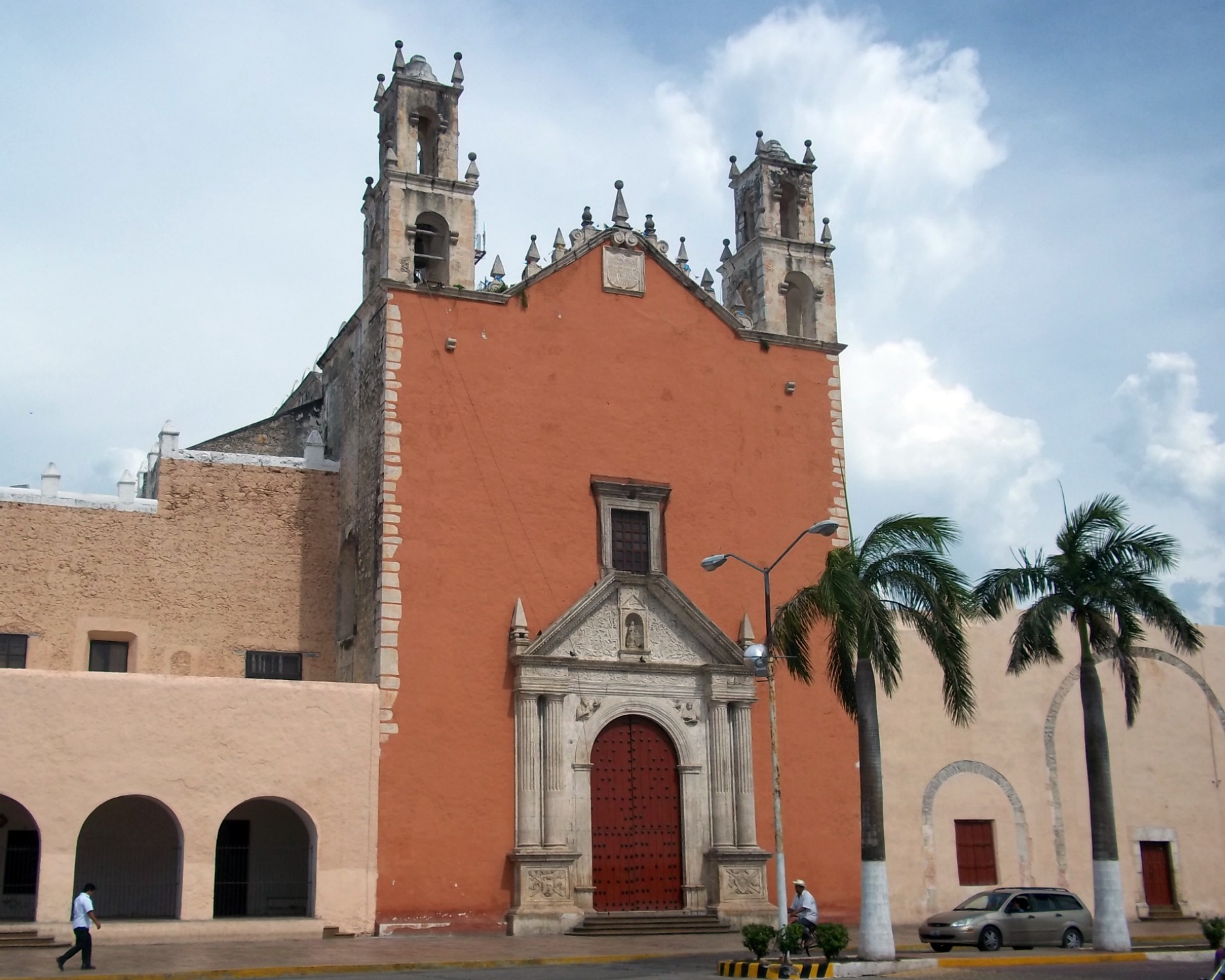
- Church of San Juan Bautista in Motul, Yucatán

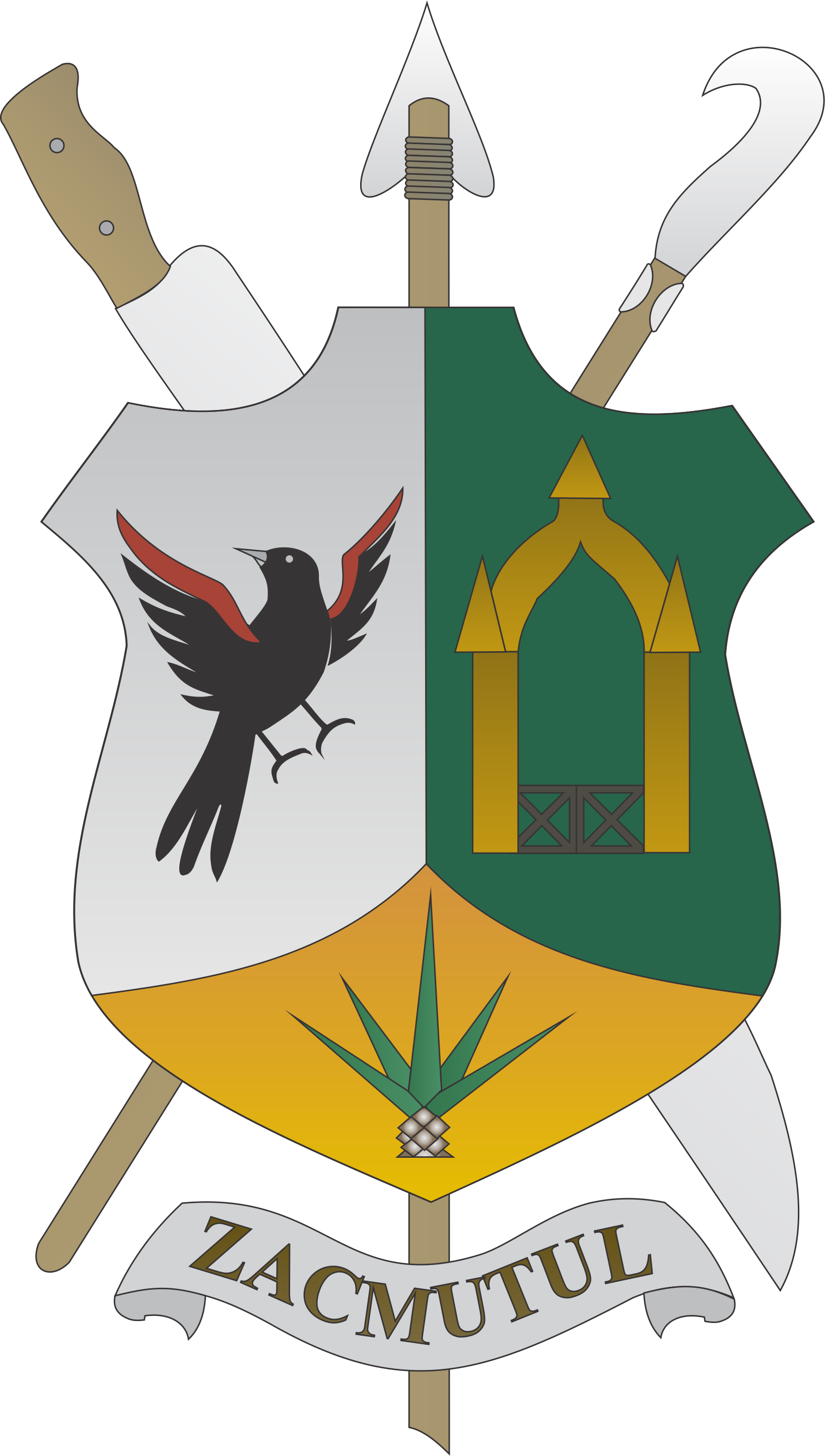
- Coat of arms

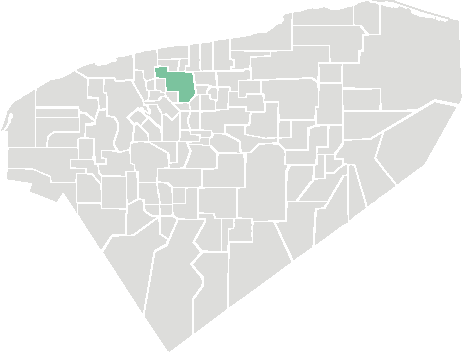
- Location of Motul in Yucatan

- Location within Mexico
- Coordinates: 21°05′42″N 89°16′59″W
- Country: Mexico
- State: Yucatán

Government
  - Type: PRI, 2012–2015
  - Municipal President: Jose Julian Pech Aguilar

Area
  - Total: 297.63 km^{2} (114.92 sq mi)
- Elevation: 6 m (20 ft)

Population (2010)
  - Total: 33,978
- Time zone: UTC-6 (CT)
- INEGI Code: 009

Motul Municipality (in the Yucatec Maya language: 'place of no overflowing') is a municipality in the Mexican state of Yucatán. It contains 297.63 km^{2} (114.92 sq mi) of land and is roughly 45 km (28 mi) east of the city of Mérida.

In June 2023, Motul was nombrated 'Pueblo Mágico' by SECTUR (Tourism Secretary)

== History ==
The founder of Motul was a Maya priest named Zac Mutul. An exact date is unknown, but the city dates from the eleventh century. Before the conquest, it was part of the province of Ceh Pech and afterwards, became part of the encomienda system. In 1581, the encomendero was Francisco de Bracamonte.

In 1821, Yucatán was declared independent of the Spanish Crown. In 1825 the area was part of the Coastal region, with its headquarters in Izamal.

During the Caste War of Yucatán in 1847, the state government ordered that suspects who appeared to be part of the conspiracy to revolt against the white settlers be whipped. Some 200 Indians were punished and the headman of Motul, Baselio May along with two of his fellow leaders José Miguel Pech and Nicolás Kuk were beaten and condemned to die, though their participation in the revolt was dubious.

On 10 March 1852 the town was elevated to the category of Villa and made head of the municipality and on 22 February 1872, it was decreed a city.

From 29 to 31 March 31, 1918, the first Socialist Congress convened in Motul to examine worker's issues. That same year, on 8 July, the Kopté Rancho, which was part of the municipality, was elevated to the status of a town. On 30 September 1924, the name of the recently assassinated governor Felipe Carrillo Puerto was appended to the name of the city, but was later repealed. On 2 October 1933, it was appended again and the official name of the head of the municipality became Motul de Carrillo Puerto.

== Governance ==
The municipal president is elected for a term of three years. The president appoints nine Councilpersons to serve on the board for three year terms, as the Secretary and councilors of sports, special events, public works, commissaries, public services, nomenclature, cemeteries, ecology, public lighting.

The Municipal Council administers the business of the municipality. It is responsible for budgeting and expenditures and producing all required reports for all branches of the municipal administration. Annually it determines educational standards for schools.

The Police Commissioners ensure public order and safety. They are tasked with enforcing regulations, distributing materials and administering rulings of general compliance issued by the council.

== Communities ==
The main town in the municipality is the eponymous Motul, Yucatán. Within its municipal jurisdiction are eight locations considered important communities. There are also a large number of smaller communities with minimal population, which include: Acabah, Cenotillo, Dzununkán, Kambul, Kancahal, Kancabchén, Rancho Kankanchá, Komchén Martinez, Kopté, Hacienda Marco, Panabá, Rogelio Chalé, Sabacnah, Sakolá, San Antonio Dzinah, San Pedro Cámara, San Pedro Chacabal, San Rafael, San Antonio, San Roque, Santa Cruz Pachón, Santa Teresa, Tunyá, Telal, Texán Espejo, Ticopo Gutiérrez, and Uitzil. The eight major population areas are shown below:

Community	Population
Entire Municipality (2010)	33,978
Kaxatáh	906 in 2005
Kiní	1502 in 2005
Mesatunich	572 in 2005
Motul de Carrillo Puerto	21508 in 2005
Sacapuc	690 in 2005
San José Hili	279 in 2005
Timul	884 in 2005
Ucí Muna	1156 in 2005

== Local festivals ==
Every year from 8 to 16 July, Motul holds a fiesta in honor of Our Lady of Carmen.

== Tourist attractions ==
- San Juan Bautista Church
- the house where Felipe Carrillo Puerto was born
- Hacienda Dzitox
- Hacienda Kancabchén Ucí
- Hacienda Santa Teresa
- Hacienda Ukanhá
- Hacienda Xinteilá

== Notable people ==
- Felipe Carrillo Puerto
- Elvia Carrillo Puerto
