= Francisco de Montejo (disambiguation) =

Francisco de Montejo (c. 1479–c. 1553), Spanish conquistador.

Francisco de Montejo may also refer to:

- Francisco de Montejo the Younger (1502–1565), his son
- Francisco de Montejo (the Nephew) (1514–1572)
