= List of oldest continuously inhabited cities =

This is a list of present-day cities by the time period over which they have been continuously inhabited as a city. The age claims listed are generally disputed. Differences in opinion can result from different definitions of "city" as well as "continuous habitation", and historical evidence is often disputed. Caveats (and sources) to the validity of each claim are discussed in the "Notes" column.

== Africa ==
=== North and Northeast Africa ===
Name	Historical region	Present location	Continuously inhabited since	Notes
Girga (as Thinis)	Ancient Egypt	Egypt	c. 3273 BC	Settlement served as the capital of the first Pharaoh of Egypt, Narmer (c. 3273–2987 BC)
Luxor (as Thebes)	Ancient Egypt	Egypt	c. 3200 BC	First established as capital of Upper Egypt, Thebes later became the religious capital of the nation until its decline in the Roman period.
Faiyum (as Shedet)	Ancient Egypt	Egypt	c. 2181 BC	Settlement established by the Old Kingdom (c. 2686–2181 BC)
Aswan (as Swenett)	Ancient Egypt	Egypt	c. 650 BC	Gained prominence in the Late Period (664–332 BC).
Benghazi (as Euesperides)	Cyrenaica	Libya	c. 525 BC	Founded in the 5th century BC, by the Greeks.
Alexandria	Ancient Egypt	Egypt	c. 332 BC	Founded by Alexander the Great on the town of Rhacotis, which dates back to the Old Kingdom
Suakin	Ancient Sudan	Sudan	c. 11th century	First occupied in the 11th century, Suakin developed into a major Islamic port city, remaining inhabited through Ottoman, Funj, Mahdist, and colonial periods. Excavations confirm architectural and trade activity from the medieval period onward.

=== East Africa ===
Name	Historical region	Present location	Continuously inhabited since	Notes
Aksum	Kingdom of Axum	Ethiopia	c. 400 BC	Ancient capital of the Kingdom of Axum.
Zeila (as Avalites)	Bilad al-Barbar	Somalia	c. 100 AD	Major trading city in the Horn of Africa.
Antananarivo	Merina Kingdom	Madagascar	1610 AD or 1625 AD	Founded by the Merina King Andrianjaka, it is the oldest city in Madagascar.

=== West Africa ===
Name	Historical region	Present location	Continuously inhabited since	Notes
Gao	Gao Empire, Songhai Empire	Mali	c. 600 AD	Gao-Saney called al-kawkaw, Gaw-Gaw by ancient Arab chroniclers is the first site of Gao, founded in the 7th century, it was the capital of the Gao Empire of Za Dynasty. A marble palace, stelae, houses and cemeteries dating from this period were discovered by archaeologists. The current Gao, built on a site near Gao-Saney, was the capital of the Songhai Empire (1464–1591), destroyed during the invasion of Songhai by the Saadians. It is today the regional capital of the Gao regions in Mali.
Benin City	Kingdom of Benin	Nigeria	c. 1000 AD	According to tradition, the original inhabitants and founders of the Edo Empire and the Edo people were ruled by the line of kings known as the Ogiso dynasty, who referred to the land as Igodomigodo. During the 16th and 17th centuries, Benin flourished economically due to its strategic position in the transatlantic trade network, exchanging goods such as pepper and ivory and slaves with European nations. It is currently the largest metropolis in Edo State and the fourth-most populous city in Nigeria.
Agadez	Songhai Empire	Niger	11th century AD	Founded in the 11th century, Agadez was an important stop for caravans crossing the Saharan Desert for centuries. Agadez was captured by the Songhai empire in 1515, and controlled by Bornu in the 17th century.
Kano	Kingdom of Kano	Nigeria	11th century AD	The foundation for the construction of Kano City Walls was laid by Sakri Gijimasu at some point between 1095 and 1134, and was completed in the middle of the 14th century during the reign of Usman Zamnagawa.
Timbuktu	Mali Empire, Songhai Empire	Mali	11th century AD	Settled by Tuareg traders as an outpost, its incorporation into the Mali Empire and Songhai, Mande, and Soninke settlement from the 13th century rapidly developed the town.
Cidade Velha (as Ribeira Grande)	Santiago Island	Cape Verde	1462 AD	The first European settlement in West Africa.
Lagos	Kingdom of Benin	Nigeria	16th century AD	Initially established as a war camp for soldiers from the Kingdom of Benin.
Ouidah	Kingdom of Whydah	Benin	16th century AD	The primary port of the Kingdom of Whydah, originally called Glehue by the Fon inhabitants. The town was conquered by the Kingdom of Dahomey in the 18th century.

=== Central Africa ===
Name	Historical region	Present location	Continuously inhabited since	Notes
M'banza-Kongo	Kongo Empire	Angola	c. 1390 AD	Capital of the Kongo Empire, founded by the Kongo people in present-day Angola.
Luanda (as São Paulo da Assunção de Loanda)	Portuguese Empire	Angola	1576 AD	Founded by Portuguese explorer Paulo Dias de Novais on 25 January 1576 as "São Paulo da Assumpção de Loanda".

=== Southern Africa ===
Name	Historical region	Present location	Continuously inhabited since	Notes
Cape Town	Dutch East India Company	South Africa	1652 AD	Founded by Dutch colonists from Dutch East India Company and is the oldest recorded city in South Africa.

== Americas ==
=== North America ===
Name	Historical region	Present location	Continuously inhabited since	Notes
Cholula	Old Cholula	Mexico	c. 1000 – c. 500 BC	Pre-Columbian Cholula grew from a small village to a regional center during the 7th century. The city was the site of the Massacre of Cholula during the military campaign of Hernán Cortés.
Flores	Maya civilization, then New Spain	Guatemala	900–600 BC	Formerly Nojpetén, the capital of the Itza kingdom, it has been occupied continuously since prehispanic times. Earliest archaeological traces date back to 900–600 BC, with major expansion of the settlement occurring around 250–400 AD. Ethnohistoric documents claim the founding of Nojpetén in the mid-15th century AD.
Izamal	Maya civilization, then New Spain	Mexico	700–450 BC	Also known as the Yellow City. Small city in the Mexican state of Yucatán, 72 kilometres east of state capital Mérida. Izamal is an important archaeological site of the Pre-Columbian Maya civilization. Continuously occupied until the Spanish Conquest. The most important pre-Hispanic constructive activity occurred during the early and late classical periods. It was partially abandoned with the rise of a group that hailed from Chichen Itza, probably around the final classical period (800–1000 AD).
Monte Albán-Zaachila-Oaxaca City	Zapotec civilization, Mixtec civilisation	Mexico	c. 500 BC	The valley of modern Oaxaca City, founded by the Spanish in 1532, has been continuously inhabited by the Oto-Manguean peoples of Mesoamerica since ancient times. The outskirts of Oaxaca City host the ruins of Monte Albán, once the capital of the Zapotecs for around 1000 years. Although Monte Albán proper was abandoned around 1000 AD, the city of Zaachila next to it rose in its place and was continuously inhabited until the arrival of Europeans.
Tututepec	Mixtec civilization	Mexico	c. 400 BC	First Tututepec settlements date to 400 BC, the site was nearly abandoned by 800 CE until Eight Deer brought a migration of Mixtecs to the site and made the location the capital of a new empire in 1083 CE, the city persists beyond Spanish conquest in 1522 into present day.
Toluca-Calixtlahuaca	Otomí peoples	Mexico	c. 400 – c. 200 BC	Toluca, in the State of Mexico, has been continuously inhabited at least since the 4th century BC.
Papantla / El Tajín	Totonac people	Mexico	c. 1st century AD	The town of Papantla in the state of Veracruz was founded by the Totonac people around the 13th century AD. The neighboring monumental city of El Tajín was settled around the 1st century AD until it was destroyed around the same time Papantla was founded.
Taos Pueblo	Taos Pueblo	United States	c. 1000 AD	Tiwa people settled in the Taos Valley around 900 CE. They constructed the oldest building still standing around 1000, with more built in the late 1200s and early 1300s. Taos was the most populous city-state of all the Pueblo peoples in the 1540s. It is the origin of the younger Tiwa Pueblos of Picuris, Sandia, Isleta, and Ysleta del Sur. Taos was the headquarters of the Pueblo Revolt in 1680 against the Spanish Empire. After this first successful anti-colonial revolution in the Americas, it became the capital city of the Pueblo republic. In the 1700s and 1800s, Taos people traded heavily with Comancheria, adopting some Plains Indian culture from the Comanche. Taos Pueblo became the capital of New Mexico again during the Río Arriba Rebellion of 1837. The United States' return of Blue Lake in 1970 marked the first success of the contemporary Land Back movement.
Oraibi	Hopi Pueblo	United States	c. 1100 AD	The Hopi of Hopi Pueblo founded Oraibi before 1100 CE.
Acoma Pueblo	Acoma Pueblo	United States	c. 1100 AD	The Keres-speaking people of Acoma moved to the area in the 1000s, making villages atop two mesas. The first village was later abandoned, and the current village dates to around 1100. Old brick buildings as early as 1144 were found on the mesa, lacking the later use of adobe in their construction. Acoma Pueblo is one of the earliest continuously inhabited communities in the United States.
Cuernavaca (Cuauhnahuac)-Teopanzolco	Nahuan peoples	Mexico	c. 1200 AD	Founded by the Nahuatl-speaking people of the Valley of Mexico with the name Cuauhnahuac. The ruins of Teopanzolco, now in downtown Cuernavaca, are thought to be the downtown of Cuauhnahuac, which was sieged and occupied by the Spanish in 1521, who renamed it to Cuernavaca.
Tucson	Hohokam	United States	c. 1300 AD	Hohokam village founded at the base of Sentinel Peak, later Tohono O'odam. Afterwards, became a Spanish presidio.
Mexico City	Mexica culture (Nahuan peoples)	Mexico	1325 AD	Founded as twin cities Tenōchtitlān (1325) and Tlāltelōlco (1337) by the Mexica. Name changed to Ciudad de México (Mexico City) after the Spanish conquest of the city in 1521. Several other pre-Columbian towns such as Azcapotzalco, Tlatelolco, Xochimilco and Coyoacán have been engulfed by the still growing metropolis and are now part of modern Mexico City. Oldest capital city in the Americas.
Santo Domingo	New Spain	Dominican Republic	1496 AD	Oldest European settlement in the New World.
San Juan	New Spain	Puerto Rico	1508 AD	Oldest continuously inhabited city in a U.S. territory.
Nombre de Dios, Colón	New Spain	Panama	1510 AD	Oldest continuously inhabited European settlement in continental America.
Baracoa	New Spain	Cuba	1511 AD	Oldest European settlement in Cuba.
Havana	New Spain	Cuba	1519 AD	Oldest major city in Cuba, established 1515, granted city status in 1592 by Philip II of Spain as "Key to the New World and Rampart of the West Indies".
Veracruz	New Spain	Mexico	1519 AD	The actual location of the settlement known as Veracruz changed multiple times. Originally established by Hernán Cortés in April 1519 – near where he made landfall (Note: It is salient to the discussion of continuous habitation that Cortés's initial founding of Veracruz was symbolic, rather than because he was actually establishing a permanent settlement. Founding a town allowed Cortés and his men to portray the land as not part of the Caribbean, thereby removing them from under the authority of the governor of Cuba, Diego Velázquez de Cuéllar. Velázquez had revoked permission for the expedition before Cortés departed Cuba.) – as the Villa Rica de la Vera Cruz, (Note: lit. Rich Town of the True Cross.) it was moved within a month to Totonac Quiahuiztlan. This location lay further inland and required a long overland trek from the port at San Juan de Ulúa to unload cargo, due to which the settlement was again moved in 1525, this time to the present-day location of La Antigua. Veracruz remained there until 1599, when pressure from mercantile elites in Seville, Mexico City, and Puebla de los Ángeles to relocate the settlement closer to the port to speed and secure trade caused it to be refounded at its present location as Nuevo Veracruz.
Panama City	Cueva Civilisation. After European colonisation: New Spain	Panama	1519 AD	Oldest European settlement on the Pacific.
Taxco	New Spain	Mexico	1529 AD	
Compostela	New Spain	Mexico	1530 AD	
Querétaro	New Spain, Otomi people, Purépecha people	Mexico	1531 AD	
Puebla	New Spain	Mexico	1531 AD	
Tepic	New Spain	Mexico	1531 AD	
Culiacán	New Spain	Mexico	1531 AD	
Campeche	New Spain	Mexico	1540 AD	
Morelia	New Spain	Mexico	1541 AD	
Guadalajara	New Spain	Mexico	1542 AD	
Mérida	Maya civilization, New Spain	Mexico	1542 AD (as the Spanish city)	It was previously known as T'ho by the Maya.
Zacatecas	New Spain	Mexico	1548 AD	
Guanajuato	New Spain	Mexico	1548 AD	
Acapulco	New Spain	Mexico	1550 AD	
Cartago	New Spain	Costa Rica	1563 AD	Oldest continuously inhabited European established settlement in Costa Rica.
St. Augustine	New Spain	United States	1565 AD	Oldest continuously inhabited European-founded city of the current 50 U.S. states.
Santa Fe	New Spain	United States	1607 AD	Oldest continuously inhabited state or territorial capital in the continental United States.
Quebec City	New France	Canada	1608 AD	Oldest confirmed city in Canada and oldest French-speaking city in the Americas.
Hampton	Virginia Company	United States	1610 AD	Founded on 9 July 1610, Hampton is the oldest continuously inhabited English settlement in the United States. Jamestown was founded earlier, but is no longer inhabited.
Hopewell	Virginia Company	United States	1613 AD	Founded as Bermuda City in 1613 and later known as City Point, Virginia, this location has undergone several name changes but has remained continuously inhabited.
Plymouth	Plymouth Colony	United States	1620 AD	Fourth-oldest continuously inhabited European-founded city in the United States
Albany	New Netherland	United States	1624 AD	Albany was founded in 1614 as Fort Nassau, but it was abandoned due to flooding and reoccupied in 1624.
New York City	New Netherland	United States	1624 AD	Founded in 1624 as New Amsterdam. Was renamed New York City in 1667. Is the 12th oldest continuously occupied European-established settlement in the continental United States
Boston	Massachusetts Bay Colony	United States	1625 AD	Settled in 1625 and established in 1630, the city of Boston, Massachusetts, was established as the capital of the Massachusetts Bay Colony on the Shawmut Peninsula. It is one of the oldest major cities of the United States. Boston was a key city in the early American Revolution against the British Empire, eventually becoming the first city free of British rule in the United States. Boston is still one of the wealthiest and most important cities in the United States.
St. John's	Newfoundland	Canada	mid-1620s AD	On 5 August 1583, Sir Humphrey Gilbert claimed the area as England's first overseas colony under a royal charter by Queen Elizabeth I. There was no permanent settlement established at the time, and Gilbert was lost at sea during his return voyage. There is documented evidence of permanent, year-round habitation by independent family operations beginning by the mid-1620s.
Port Royal-Annapolis Royal	New France	Canada	1629 AD	Oldest continuously inhabited settlement incorporated as a Town in North America. Initial settlement was 1605, with confirmed continuous settlement since at least 1629.
Saint John	New France	Canada	1631 AD	Oldest incorporated city in Canada.
Trois-Rivières	New France	Canada	1634 AD	Fourth-oldest city in Canada.
Montreal	New France	Canada	1642 AD	Fifth-oldest city in Canada.
Sault Ste. Marie	New France	Canada and United States	1668 AD	A single settlement until 1817, when it was divided into Sault Ste. Marie, Ontario, Canada and Sault Ste. Marie, Michigan, United States. The latter is the oldest European-founded city in the Midwestern United States and third-oldest US city west of the Appalachian Mountains.
Philadelphia	Province of Pennsylvania	United States	1681 AD	In 1681, King Charles II gave William Penn a large piece of his newly acquired American land holdings to repay a debt the king owed to Admiral Sir William Penn, Penn's father. Afterwards, Penn founded Philadelphia with a core group of accompanying Quakers and others seeking religious freedom on lands he purchased from the local chieftains of the Lenape or Delaware nation.
Natchitoches	New France	United States	1699 AD	Natchitoches was established in 1714 by French explorer Louis Juchereau de St. Denis. It is the oldest permanent European settlement within the borders of the 1803 Louisiana Purchase. Natchitoches was founded as a French outpost on the Red River for trade with Spanish-controlled Mexico; French traders settled there as early as 1699.
Detroit	New France	United States	1701 AD	First European settlement above tidewater in North America.
San Antonio	New Spain	United States	1718 AD	Founded as a Spanish mission and colonial outpost in 1718, the city in 1731 became the first chartered civil settlement in what is now present-day Texas.
New Orleans	New France	United States	1718 AD	
Winnipeg	British America	Canada	1738 AD	Founded as Fort Rouge. Oldest city in the Canadian Prairies.
Charlotte	Province of North Carolina	United States	1768 AD	Area said to have been pre-colonially settled by the Catawba tribe with records dating back to 1567.
San Diego	New Spain	United States	1769 AD	Birthplace of California and oldest city on the West Coast of the United States.
Victoria	Colony of Vancouver Island	Canada	1843 AD	Oldest city on the West Coast of Canada.

=== South America ===
Name	Historical region	Present location	Continuously inhabited since	Notes
Cusco	Inca Empire	Peru	c. 1100 AD	The Killke occupied the region from 900 to 1200, prior to the arrival of the Incas in the 13th century. Carbon-14 dating of Sacsayhuamán, the walled complex outside Cusco, has demonstrated that the Killke culture constructed the fortress about 1100.
Cumaná	New Granada	Venezuela	1515 AD	Oldest continuously inhabited, European-established settlement in the continent.
Santa Marta	New Granada	Colombia	1525 AD	Oldest still-inhabited city founded by Spaniards in Colombia.
Cananeia	Governorate General of Brazil	Brazil	1531 AD	Oldest inhabited settlement founded by the Portuguese in Brazil.
São Vicente, São Paulo	Governorate General of Brazil	Brazil	1532 AD	First Portuguese city in the Americas.
Piura	Peru	Peru	1532 AD	Oldest European-founded city in Peru.
Lima	Peru	Peru	1535 AD	Second-oldest continuously inhabited European-settled capital city in South America. The oldest being Quito.
Vila Velha, Espírito Santo	Governorate General of Brazil	Brazil	1535 AD	Third-oldest continuously inhabited Portuguese-settled village in South America. The oldest is São Vicente.
Cali	New Granada	Colombia	1536 AD	On 25 July 1536 Belalcázar founded Santiago de Cali, first established a few kilometres north of the present location, near what are now the towns of Vijes and Riofrío.
Asunción	Viceroyalty of Rio de la Plata	Paraguay	1537 AD	Juan de Salazar y Espinoza, traversing the Paraguay River on his way from Buenos Aires, stopped briefly at a bay in the left bank to resupply his ships. He found the natives friendly, and decided to found a fort there in August 1537. He named it Nuestra Señora Santa María de la Asunción (Our Lady Saint Mary of the Assumption – the Roman Catholic Church celebrates the Feast of the Assumption on August 15).
Iguape	Governorate General of Brazil	Brazil	1538 AD	City founded after the War of Iguape
Bogotá	New Granada	Colombia	1540 AD	The name of Bogotá, is derived from Bacatá, an indigenous area inhabitanted by the native Muisca encompassing what is presently the Colombian capital.
Santiago	Captaincy General of Chile	Chile	1541 AD	Oldest continuously inhabited European established settlement in Chile.
Salvador	Governorate General of Brazil	Brazil	1549 AD	First planned city founded by Portuguese, and first capital of Brazil.
Santiago del Estero	Río de la Plata	Argentina	1553 AD	Oldest continuously inhabited city in Argentina.
São Paulo	Governorate General of Brazil	Brazil	1554 AD	On January 25, 1554, a group of Jesuit missionaries, led by Father Manuel da Nóbrega, settled on a plateau then called Piratininga, where they founded a college dedicated to the evangelization of the Amerindian populations. The name São Paulo, initially São Paulo dos Campos de Piratininga, was given to it because it was the day dedicated to the apostle with that name.

== Asia ==
=== West Asia ===
Name	Historical region	Present location	Continuously inhabited since	Notes
Diyarbakır	Mesopotamia	Turkey	c. 8000 BC	Within the city center lies the Amida Mound (Amida Höyük), with archaeological evidence of settlement dating back to around 8000 BC. Additionally, the Çayönü Mound, located within Diyarbakır's provincial borders, is considered one of the earliest known permanent human settlements.
Aleppo	Levant	Syria	c. 5000 BC	The site of Aleppo may have been inhabited since the 6th millennium BC.
Byblos	Levant	Lebanon	c. 5000 BC	Inhabited since Neolithic times, it has been closely linked to the legends and history of the Mediterranean region for thousands of years. Byblos is also directly associated with the history and diffusion of the Phoenician alphabet.
Sidon	Levant	Lebanon	c. 4000 BC	The old Sidon neighborhood has been continuously inhabited since 4000 BC.
Damascus	Levant	Syria	c. 3000 BC	Excavations on the outskirts of the city have revealed evidence of inhabitation as early as 8000 to 10,000 BC.
Jerusalem	Levant	Israel and Palestine	c. 3000 BC	The Execration Texts (c. 19th century BC), which refer to a city called rwš3lmm, variously transcribed as Rušalimum/Urušalimum/Rôsh-ramen and the Amarna letters (c. 14th century BC) may be the earliest mention of the city. Nadav Na'aman argues its fortification as the centre of a kingdom dates to around the 18th century BC.
Tyre	Levant	Lebanon	c. 2750 BC	Tyre was founded as an island city around 2750 BC.
Hama	Levant	Syria	c. 2400 BC	
Erbil	Mesopotamia	Iraq	c. 2300 BC	The Citadel of Erbil is a fortified settlement in Erbil, Iraq. The city corresponds to the ancient Assyrian city of Arbela. Settlement at Erbil can be dated back to possibly 6000 BC, but there was no urban life until c. 2300 BC.
Ankara	Anatolia	Turkey	c. 2000 BC	The oldest settlements in and around the city center of Ankara belonged to the Hattic civilization which existed during the Bronze Age.
Jaffa	Levant	Israel	c. 2000 BC	Archaeological evidence shows habitation from 7500 BC.
Acre	Levant	Israel	c. 2000 BC	There were initial settlements in the Acre area dated around 3000 BC.
Jableh	Levant	Syria	2nd millennium BC	There were initial settlements in the area of Jableh, such as Tell Sukas, dated between the 6th-7th millennium BC, and Tell Tweini.
Beirut	Levant	Lebanon	c. 2000 – c. 1800 BC	
Latakia	Syria	Syria	2nd millennium BC	In the 2nd millennium BC, the city was the Canaanite port of Ramitha; it was part of the Kingdom of Ugarit, only a few miles further north.
Eskişehir	Anatolia	Turkey	c. 1000 BC	The city was founded by the Phrygians in at least 1000 BC, although it has been estimated to be older than 4,000 years old. Many Phrygian artifacts and sculptures can still be found in the city's archeological museum.
Gaza	Levant	Palestine	c. 1000 BC	While evidence of habitation dates back at least 5,000 years, it is said to be continuously inhabited for a little more than 3,000 years.
Hebron	Levant	Palestine	Iron Age	
Jericho	Levant	Palestine	early 1st millennium BC	Traces of habitation from c. 9000 BC. Fortifications date to 6800 BC (or earlier), making Jericho the earliest known walled city. Archaeological evidence indicates that the city was destroyed and abandoned several times (sometimes remaining uninhabited for hundreds of years at a time), with later rebuilding and expansion.
Medina	Hejaz	Saudi Arabia	9th century BC	Medina has been inhabited at least 1500 years before the Hijra.
Vani	Colchis	Georgia	before 8th century BC	
Hamadan (Ecbatana)	Media	Iran	c. 800 BC	The capital city of the Median Empire.
Yerevan	Yerevan	Armenia	782 BC	Founded as Erebuni Fortress by the Urartians and most likely inhabited continuously thereafter; though, historical sources from the 5th century BC to the 7th century AD are lacking.
Tabriz	Media	Iran	714 B.C.	An important and prosperous city along the silk road, it was made the capital city several times during various periods under various ruling dynasties of the region.
Istanbul (as Byzantion)	Thrace, Anatolia	Turkey	685 BC Anatolia; 660 BC Thrace	Founded as a colony of Megara. Neolithic site dated to 6400 BC, over port of Lygos by Thracians c. 1150 BC.
Kutaisi	Colchis	Georgia	6th to 4th century BC	Archaeological evidence indicates that the city functioned as the capital of the kingdom of Colchis in the sixth to fifth centuries BC.
Bosra	Levant	Syria	c. 500 BC	

=== Central and South Asia ===
Name	Historical region	Present location	Continuously inhabited since	Notes
Multan	Indus Valley Civilisation	Pakistan	3000–2800 BC	One of the oldest cities in South Asia. Also known as Mulasthana or Kashyapapura, this city was founded by Kashyapa, according to Hindu Puranas. The region is home to numerous archaeological sites dating to the era of the Early Harappan period of the Indus Valley Civilisation.
Kandahar	Arachosia	Afghanistan	3000–1500 BC	Perhaps the oldest city in Afghanistan. Mundigak is an important archeological site and is located in the present day Kandahar Province.
Balkh	Bactria	Afghanistan	2000-1000 BC	It was considered a major stop on the Silk Road as well as the birthplace of Zoroastrianism and was a major hub for Buddhism. Arab conquerors have called it Umm-al-belad, mother of cities.
Delhi (as Indraprastha)	Ancient India	India	1200–900 BC	Established as the ancient city of Indraprastha c. 1200 – c. 900 BC, the later capital of the Kuru empire (after Hastinapura) by the ruling Kuru dynasty, over the Upper Ganges-Yamuna doabs of Northern India.
Varanasi	Kashi	India	c. 1200 BC	Oldest continuously inhabited city in India. Finds its mention in Ancient Vedas.
Sayram	Transoxiana	Kazakhstan	1000 BC	Oldest continuously inhabited city in Kazakhstan. The city of Sayram is believed by some historians to have been mentioned in the Avesta, with Sairima possibly meaning Sayram. Evidence of an early plumbing system has been found around Sayram and Transoxiana.
Dushanbe	Achaemenid	Tajikistan	1000 BC	Bronze Age burials were discovered dating from the end of the second to the beginning of the first millennium BC. Achaemenid dishes and ceramics were found 6 kilometres (3.7 mi) east of Dushanbe in Qiblai, as the city was controlled by the Achaemenids from the sixth century BC.
Samarkand	Sogdia	Uzbekistan	800–500 BC	Oldest continuously inhabited city in Uzbekistan.
Ujjain	Malwa	India	c. 600 BC	
Peshawar	Gandhara	Pakistan	539 BC	One of the oldest cities of Pakistan, the area was part of Pushkalavati, the capital of Gandhara. During the Kushan Empire, it was known as Purushapura.
Bukhara	Sogdia	Uzbekistan	c. 500 BC	Bukhara was an important Central Asian hub on the Silk Road. The name dates back to the Sanskrit word vihāra, or Buddhist monastery.
Sialkot (Sagala)	Punjab	Pakistan	4th century BC	The first record of Sialkot dates from the invasion of Alexander the Great, who conquered upper Punjab in 326 BCE.
Anuradhapura	Kingdom of Rajarata	Sri Lanka	4th century BC	
Dhaka	Iron Age India	Bangladesh	c. 500–200 BC	Dhaka, located at the geographical center on modern day Bangladesh, has always been at the crossroads of land-based and fluvial commerce. So much so that there have also been findings, which date back to Ashoka's reign.
Tamluk	Tamralipta	India	3rd century BC	Tamluk or Tamralipta was an ancient port city in Bengal, on the Bay of Bengal. According to ancient Jain texts, Tamralipta was the capital of the Vanga kingdom. The Chinese pilgrim Faxian visited the city in the 5th century AD, and Xuanzang visited it in the 7th century. Tamralipta Jatiya Sarkar was an independent parallel government established in the areas of Tamluk, during the Quit India Movement (1942–1944). It was the first people's government and only parallel government running independently for two years during British Raj.
Madurai	Pandyan Kingdom	India	3rd century BC	Carbon dating evidences of artefacts found at Vaigai Civilisation are found to be from 3rd century BCMegasthenes may have visited Madurai during the 3rd century BC, with the city referred as "Methora" in his accounts. The view is contested by some scholars who believe "Methora" refers to the north Indian city of Mathura, as it was a large and established city in the Mauryan Empire.
Lahore	Punjab	Pakistan	c. 1-7th century AD	The origin of Lahore can be traced back somewhere between 1st and 7th centuries A.D. One of the oldest cities of South Asia. The first document that mentions Lahore by name is the Hudud al-'Alam ("The Regions of the World"), written by an unknown author in 982 AD.

=== East Asia ===
Name	Historical region	Present location	Continuously inhabited since	Notes
Zhengzhou (as Bo)	Shang dynasty	China	c. 1600 BC	The first capital city of Shang.
Yanshi, Henan (as Xibo)	Shang dynasty	China	c. 1600 BC	The Shang city at Yanshi was closely associated with the Erlitou site, 6 kilometres (3.7 mi) away, which was first settled around 3500 BC.
Luoyang (as Luoyi, Henan, Dongdu, Shendu)	Shang dynasty	China	c. 1600 BC	
Handan	Jin, Zhao	China	c. 1080 BC	
Beijing (as Ji, Youzhou, Fanyang, Yanjing, Zhongdu, Dadu)	Ji, Yan	China	c. 1045 BC	Paleolithic Homo sapiens lived in the caves from about 27,000 to 10,000 years ago. Its historical prefecture, Youzhou, was founded in 106 BC.
Qufu (as Lu)	Lu	China	before 770 BC	Founded during the Western Zhou period as the Lu capital.
Shangqiu (as Suiyang, Songzhou, Guide)	Song	China	before 770 BC	
Jingzhou (as Jinan, Yingdu, Jiangling, Jingsha, Nanjun)	Chu	China	c. 689 BC	
Weinan (as Dongfu)	Qin	China	c. 668 BC	
Hefei (as Luyi, Ruyin, Luzhou, Hezhou, Lujiang)	Zhou dynasty	China	c. 650 BC	The Viscount of Lu was asked to set the capital of his manor at Luyi (庐邑), which is in the north of today's downtown Hefei.
Suzhou (as Gusu, Wu, Pingjiang)	Wu	China	514 BC	
Taiyuan (as Jinyang)	Jin	China	c. 497 BC	
Nanjing (as Yecheng, Moling, Jianye, Jiankang, Jinling, Yingtian, Jiangning)	Wu	China	c. 495 BC	Fu Chai, Lord of the State of Wu, founded a fort named Yecheng (冶城) in today's Nanjing area.
Chengdu	Shu	China	c. 400 BC	The 9th Kaiming king of the ancient Shu moved his capital to the city's current location from today's nearby Pixian.
Changsha (as Linxiang, Xiangzhou, Tanzhou, Tianlin)	Chu	China	c. 365 BC	
Kaifeng (as Daliang, Bianzhou, Dongjing, Bianjing)	Wei	China	c. 364 BC	The State of Wei founded a city called Daliang (大梁) as its capital in this area.
Chongqing	Ba	China	c. 316 BC	
Liaoyang (as Xiangping, Changping, Liaodong, Pingzhou, Liaozhou, Dongdu, Dongjing)	Yan	China	c. 279 BC	
Guangzhou (as Panyu)	Qin dynasty	China	214 BC	Some traditional Chinese histories placed Nanwucheng's founding during the reign of Ji Yan, king of Zhou from 314 to 256 BC. It was said to have consisted of little more than a stockade of bamboo and mud.
Kashgar	Shule Kingdom	China	2nd century BC	The city of Kashgar was the capital of the Iranic Shule Kingdom and served as a major hub of the Silk Road.
Pyeongyang (as Wanggeom-seong)	Gojoseon	North Korea	c. 194 BC	Existed as the capital city of Gojoseon since before at least 194 BC.
Gyeongju	Silla	South Korea	57 BC	Built as the capital city of Silla in 57 BC.
Seoul (as Wiryeseong)	Baekje	South Korea	18 BC	Built as the capital city of Baekje in 18 BC.
Osaka (as Osumi)	Japan	Japan	390 AD	It was inhabited as early at the 6th–5th centuries BC, and became a port city during the Kofun period. It temporarily served as the capital of Japan from 645 to 655.
Nara (as Heijō)	Japan	Japan	708 AD	Built in 708 and became the capital city in 710 as Heijō-kyō.
Kyoto (as Heian, and sometimes known in the west as Miyako)	Japan	Japan	710 AD	Shimogamo Shrine was built in the 6th century, but the city was officially founded as Heian in 710 and became the capital city in 794 as Heian-kyō.

=== Southeast Asia ===
Name	Historical region	Present location	Continuously inhabited since	Notes
Hanoi	Âu Lạc	Vietnam	257 BC	In 257 BC, after defeating the last Hùng king, An Dương Vương merged Văn Lang and Nam Cương in to Âu Lạc and set the capital at Cổ Loa citadel, nowadays Đông Anh district of Hanoi. It was also mentioned as Tống Bình in 454 AD and the Đại La citadel was built in 767 during the reign of Emperor Daizong of Tang. Ly Cong Uan then renamed it Thăng Long in 1010.
Huế	Lâm Ấp	Vietnam	192 AD	Huế was built under the name Kandarpapura and used for about 1 century from the beginning of the 4th century to the end of the 4th century (after 380) during the period when Hinayana Buddhism (Thevarada) and Hinduism heavily influenced Lâm Ấp.
Jakarta	Tarumanagara	Indonesia	417 AD	The present area of Jakarta is continuously inhabited as recorded in stone inscription at least since the 5th century CE. According to the 5th century Tugu inscription, the coastal lands in present day Tugu village in North Jakarta, was settled as the capital of Tarumanagara kingdom. The city is continuously inhabited later as Sunda Kelapa, the harbour of Sunda Kingdom (7th century to 1527), as Jayakarta (1527–1619), Dutch port city of Batavia (1610–1942), and Jakarta (1942–today).
Pyay	Pyu city-states	Myanmar	638 AD	Much debate surrounds the construction of Sri Ksetra. Htin Aung suggests that Pyu might have been founded in 78 CE, based on the Sanskrit / Pyu Era. D. G. E. Hall and Gordon Luce, however, claim that civilisation of the Irrawaddy Valley could not have been possible before the 4th century, thus, attributing the founding of Sri Ksetra to 638, from which the current Burmese Kawza Era begins.
Palembang	Srivijaya	Indonesia	683 AD	Believed to be the oldest city in the Malay realm, capital of the Srivijaya empire. According to Kedukan Bukit inscription Jayanasa established Srivijaya kingdom in Palembang area.
Luang Prabang	Muang Sua	Laos	698 AD	
Yogyakarta	Mataram Kingdom	Indonesia	732 AD	The historic realm of Mataram of Southern Central Java region, which corresponds to today Yogyakarta city and its surrounding has its root in 8th century Mataram Kingdom. According to Canggal inscription dated 732, the area traditionally known as "Mataram" became the capital of the Medang Kingdom, identified as Mdang i Bhumi Mataram established by King Sanjaya. The city reestablished again as the capital of Mataram Sultanate in 1587, and Yogyakarta Sultanate in 1755.
Malang	Kanjuruhan Kingdom	Indonesia	740 AD	According to Dinoyo inscription, Malang in the past known as Kanjuruhan kingdom and badut temple dated 740 AD but the city itself established older than the temple and inscription. Today Malang Raya or Malang city is the 2nd largest city and metro area in east Java.
Nakhon Si Thammarat	Tambralinga	Thailand	775 AD	An inscription was found at Wat Sema Muang that bore: The king of Srivijaya "had established a foothold on the Malay Peninsula at Ligor" by 775, where he "built various edifices, including a sanctuary dedicated to the Buddha and to the Bodhisattvas Padmapani and Vajrapani."
Siem Reap	Khmer Empire	Cambodia	801 AD	Originally founded as Angkor. Capital of the Khmer Empire.
Lamphun	Hariphunchai	Thailand	896 AD	
Magelang	Mataram	Indonesia	907 AD	Magelang was established on 11 April 907. Magelang was then known as a village called Mantyasih, which is now known as Meteseh.
Hưng Yên	Tĩnh Hải quân	Vietnam	966 AD	Set as the temporary capital of area controlled by warlord Phạm Bạch Hổ during the Anarchy of the 12 Warlords
Hoa Lư	Đại Cồ Việt	Vietnam	968 AD	After reunifying Vietnam and ending the anarchy of the 12 warlords, Đinh Bộ Lĩnh was crowned Emperor of Đại Cồ Việt and set the capital at Hoa Lư. The city lies in a mountainous area and had a defensive position that contributed to the victory of Đại Cồ Việt against the Song dynasty of China.
Bandar Seri Begawan	Po-ni and Bruneian Empire	Brunei	977 AD	Oldest city in Borneo.
Butuan	Rajahnate of Butuan	Philippines	1001 AD	Oldest continuously inhabited city in Mindanao.
Bắc Ninh	Đại Cồ Việt	Vietnam	1009 AD	In 1009, Cổ Pháp village was converted into the city of Thiên Đức, nowadays Bắc Ninh city.
Kediri	Kediri Kingdom	Indonesia	1042 AD	Along with changes in name, it is essentially a union of the two capitals of Panjalu Kingdom and Janggala Kingdom. The settlements are always interspersed along both banks of Brantas River. Administratively, the Government of Indonesia divides Kediri into two political entities, Kediri Regency and the Town of Kediri which is located in the middle of the regency. Nevertheless, archaeological remains exist beyond administrative boundaries and settlements often spread disregarding administrative boundaries between both entities.
Yangon	Konbaung dynasty	Myanmar	1043 AD	Yangon was founded as Dagon in the early 11th century (circa 1028–1043) by the Mon but was renamed to "Yangon" after King Alaungpaya conquered Dagon.
Surabaya	Janggala Kingdom	Indonesia	1045 AD	The port city of Janggala or Hujung Galuh was one of the two Javanese capital city that was formed when Airlangga abdicated his throne in 1045 in favour of his two sons. The Kingdom of Janggala comprised the northeastern part of the Kingdom of Kahuripan. The other Kingdom was Kediri. Derived its name from the words "suro" (shark) and "boyo" (crocodile), two creatures which are in a local myth.
Singapore	Kingdom of Singapura	Singapore	1170 AD	
Sukhothai	Lavo Kingdom	Thailand	1180 AD	
Singhapala	Rajahnate of Cebu	Philippines	c. 1300 AD	Ancient city founded by Sri Rajahmura Lumaya or Sri Lumay, a half Tamil Chola prince. Now part of Barangay Mabolo in Northern district of Cebu City.
Banda Aceh	Aceh Sultanate	Indonesia	1205 AD	Originally named Kutaraja, which means "City of the King".
Manila	Tondo and Rajahnate of Maynila	Philippines	1258 AD	A settlement in the Manila area already existed by the year 1258. This settlement was ruled by Rajah Avirjirkaya whom described as a "Majapahit Suzerain". This settlement was attacked by a Bruneian commander named Rajah Ahmad, who defeated Avirjirkaya and established Manila as a "Muslim principality". By 1570, when the Spanish, led by Miguel López de Legazpi, arrived, it was still inhabited and led by at least one Lakan and several Rajahs.
Nam Định	Đại Việt	Vietnam	1262 AD	In 1262, Tức Mặc village was converted into the city of Thiên Trường, nowadays Nam Định city.
Chiang Rai	Ngoenyang	Thailand	1262 AD	
Chiang Mai	Lanna Kingdom	Thailand	1294 AD or 1296 AD	Mangrai founded Chiang Mai in 1294 or 1296 on a site that the Lawa people called Wiang Nopburi.
Taungoo	Pagan Kingdom	Myanmar	1279 AD	Taungoo was founded in 1279 in the waning days of Pagan as part of frontier expansion southwards.
Sagaing	Sagaing Kingdom	Myanmar	1315 AD	Sagaing was the capital of Sagaing Kingdom (1315-1364), one of the minor kingdoms that rose up after the fall of Pagan dynasty, where one of Thihathu's sons, Athinkhaya, established himself.
Ayutthaya	Ayutthaya Kingdom	Thailand	1350 AD	Derived its name from the holy Hindu city of Ayodhya, it was the capital city of Siam from 1350 until 1767.
Muar	Majapahit	Malaysia	1361 AD	
Phnom Penh	Khmer Empire	Cambodia	1372 AD	
Malacca	Malacca Sultanate	Malaysia	1396	
Bangkok	Ayutthaya Kingdom	Thailand	Early 15th century AD	The history of Bangkok dates at least back to the early 15th century, when it was a village on the west bank of the Chao Phraya River, under the rule of Ayutthaya.
Hải Dương	Đại Việt	Vietnam	1469 AD	
Hội An	Đại Việt	Vietnam	1471 AD	
Bogor	Sunda Kingdom	Indonesia	1482 AD	

== Europe ==
Name	Historical region/period	Present location	Continuously inhabited since	Notes
Plovdiv	Neolithic Europe, Iron Age Europe	Bulgaria	6000 BC	Evidence of continuous settlement since 6000 BC. Later a Thracian settlement in the Iron Age. In the 4th century BC, Philipopolis (Plovdiv) emerged as a city, founded as such by Philip II of Macedon, the father of Alexander the Great.
Argos	Neolithic Europe, Mycenaean Greece	Greece	5000 BC	The city has been continuously inhabited mostly as an urban settlement for 7,000 years. Recorded history begins in mid 2nd millennium BC.
Chania	Crete	Greece	4th millennium BC	Minoan foundation as Kydonia.
Thebes	Aegean civilization	Greece	c. 3000 BC	Thebes was settled in prehistoric times, with evidence of settlement dating back to around 3000 BC. According to Greek mythology, the city was founded by Cadmus, who sowed the teeth of a dragon into the ground, from which warriors sprang to build the city.
Athens	Aegean civilization	Greece	3rd millennium BC	Oldest recorded history begins at least from 1600 BC, Athens has been continuously inhabited for at least 5,000 years, making it the oldest European capital city.
Shkodra	Illyria	Albania	2250–2000 BC	Continuously inhabited since the Early Bronze Age, an urban settlement called Skodra was founded by Illyrians in the 4th century BC and fortified in moenia aeacia style, it became the capital of the Illyrian kingdom under the Ardiaei and Labeatae and was one of the most important cities of the Balkans in ancient times.
Larisa	Aegean civilization	Greece	c. 2000 BC	Founded by the Pelasgians, who are believed to have named the city in Thessaly as Larissa, a term that signifies 'citadel' or 'fortress'.
Nafplio	Mycenaean Greece	Greece	Early 14th century BC	Mentioned as Nuplija, the port of Mycenae, in the "Aegean List" of the Mortuary Temple of Amenhotep III, early 14th century BC.
Cádiz	Phoenicia	Spain	c. 1100 BC	Founded as Gadir by the Phoenicians.
Matera	Prehistoric Italy	Italy	c. 1000 BC	According to Leonardo A. Chisena, the area was first settled in the Palaeolithic (10th millennium BC). According to Anne Parmly Toxey, Matera has been "occupied continuously for at least three millennia".
Zadar (as Zara)	Liburnia	Croatia	c. 900 BC	Continuously inhabited since the 9th century BC, the district of present-day Zadar has been populated since prehistoric times. The earliest evidence of human life comes from the Late Stone Age, while numerous settlements have been dated as early as the Neolithic. The Liburnians had settled by the 9th century BC. Its population at that time is estimated at 2,000.
Derbent	Caucasus	Russia	8th century BC	Continuously inhabited since the 8th century BC, it was a part of Caucasian Albania that became a satrap of the Persian Achaemenid Empire.
Lisbon	Lusitania	Portugal	8th century BC	Roman city of Olisipo. Phoenician settlement since as early as 800 BC.
Málaga	Phoenicia	Spain	770 BC	Founded as Málaka by the Phoenicians.
Mdina	Ancient Malta	Malta	8th century BC	Founded as Phoenician Melite.
Rome	Latium	Italy	c. 753 BC	The traditional founding date is 753 BC. Archaeology shows that the site has been inhabited since c. 1200 – c. 1000 BC, with urbanisation beginning around the mid-eighth century BC.
Reggio di Calabria (as Rhegion)	Magna Graecia	Italy	743 BC	
Catania (as Katane)	Sicily, Magna Graecia	Italy	729 BC	Built at the foot of Mount Etna, the city has a seismic history and it was destroyed several times by earthquakes or by eruptions and lava flows; but every time it was rebuilt again. For this reason, Catania adopted the symbol of the Phoenix and the Latin motto Melior de cinere surgo (I rise from my ashes in a better state than before).
Corfu (city) (as Kerkyra)	Corfu	Greece	c. 709 BC.	Founded as a colony of the Greek city of Corinth
Istanbul (as Byzantion)	Thrace, Anatolia	Turkey	685 BC Anatolia; 660 BC Thrace	Founded as a colony of Megara; Neolithic site dated to 6400 BC, over port of Lygos by Thracians c. 1150 BC.
Syracuse	Sicily	Italy	ca. 680-675 BC (traditionally 734 BC)	A colony of the Greek city of Corinth.
Naples	Magna Graecia	Italy	c. 680 BC	Actually the date at which an older settlement close by, called Parthenope, was founded by settlers from Cumae. This eventually merged with Neapolis proper, which was founded c. 470 BC.
Durrës	Illyria	Albania	627–625 BC	Founded as the Greek colony of Epidamnos in cooperation with the local Illyrian Taulantii.
Sozopol	Thrace	Bulgaria	610 BC	Founded by Milesian colonists around 610 BC, was named Apollonia Pontica in honour of the patron deity of Miletus – Apollo. The Ancient authors identify the philosopher named Anaximander as the founder of the city.
Kerch	Crimea	Ukraine (de jure) and Russia (de facto)	c. 610 BC	Founded as an Ancient Greek colony known as Panticapaeum.
Marseille (as Massalia)	Archaic Greece	France	600 BC	Founded as a colony of the Greek city of Phocaea.
Constanța	Dobruja	Romania	c. 600 BC	Founded as the Greek colony of Tomis.
Bilhorod-Dnistrovskyi	Budjak	Ukraine	6th century BC	Founded as an Ancient Greek colony of Tyras.
Nesebar	Thrace	Bulgaria	beginning of the 6th century BC	Originally a Thracian settlement, known as Mesembria, the town became a Greek colony when settled by Dorians from Megara at the beginning of the 6th century BC, then known as Mesembria. It was an important trading centre from then on and a rival of Apollonia (Sozopol). It remained the only Dorian colony along the Black Sea coast, as the rest were typical Ionian colonies. At 425–424 BC the town joined the Delian League, under the leadership of Athens.
Mangalia	Dobruja	Romania	middle or end of the 6th century BC	Founded as the Greek colony of Callatis by the city of Heraclea Pontica. The Greek colony was likely developed on the site of an earlier Getic settlement named Acervetis or Carbatis.
Varna	Thrace	Bulgaria	585–570 BC	Founded as Odessos by settlers from the Greek city of Miletus.
Sofia	Moesia	Bulgaria	4th century BC	Celtic foundation as Serdica. Habitation in the area since 7000 BC,
Lezhë	Illyria	Albania	4th century BC	Founded by Greeks in the 4th century BC as an urban settlement with the name Lissos, it became an important city in the Illyrian kingdom under the Ardiaei and Labeatae.
Stara Zagora	Thrace	Bulgaria	342 BC	It was called Beroe in ancient times and was founded by Philip II of Macedon although a Thracian settlement neolithic inhabitation have been discovered as well. It also has the oldest copper mines in Europe (5th millennium BC)
Thessaloniki	Macedonia (ancient kingdom)	Greece	315 BC	Founded as a new city in the same place of the older city Therme.
Berat	Illyria	Albania	4th century BC	Founded by Greeks or Cassander of Macedon as Antipatreia.
Belgrade	Illyria	Serbia	279 BC	The present day territory of Belgrade has been continuously inhabited for more than 7000 years. Proto-urban Vinča culture prospered around Belgrade in the 6th millennium BC. The fortified city of Belgrade founded around 279 BC as Singidunum.
Colchester	Britain	United Kingdom	20–10 BC	Considered to be the oldest recorded town in the United Kingdom. First British town to be given the status Colonia in the Roman empire, where it was known as Camulodunum and was recorded by Pliny the Elder. The Celtic name of the city, Camulodunon appears on coins minted by tribal chieftain Tasciovanus in the period 20–10 BC. Before the Roman conquest of Britain, it was already a centre of power for Celtic king Cunobeline.
Braga	Lusitania	Portugal	c. 16-15 BC	Bracara Augusta was founded in 16-15 BC under the order of the emperor Augustus.
Strasbourg	Germania Superior	France	12 BC	First official mention as the Roman camp of Argentoratum. The area had been populated since the Middle Paleolithic.

== Oceania ==
Name	Historical region	Present location	Continuously inhabited since	Notes
Hagåtña	Captaincy General of the Philippines	United States	1668 AD	Founded by Spanish Jesuit friar Diego Luis de San Vitores, originally a Chamorro settlement. It is located in Guam, an island that is an unincorporated territory of the United States in the Micronesia subregion of the western Pacific Ocean.
Sydney	New South Wales	Australia	1788 AD	Oldest city in Australia. Radiocarbon dating suggests human activity occurred in and around Sydney for at least 30,000 years, in the Upper Paleolithic period. However, numerous Aboriginal stone tools found in Sydney's far western suburbs' gravel sediments were dated to be from 45,000 to 50,000 years BP, which would mean that humans could have been in the region earlier than thought, although they lived exclusively as hunter-gatherer tribes until the early British colonial period. The first people to occupy the Sydney region were an Indigenous Australian group called the Eora.
Hobart	Tasmania	Australia	1803 AD	Second-oldest city in Australia. Prior to British settlement, the area had been occupied for at least 8,000 years, but possibly for as long as 35,000 years, by the semi-nomadic Mouheneener tribe, a sub-group of the Nuennone, or South-East tribe.
George Town	Tasmania	Australia	1804 AD	Third-oldest city in Australia.
Newcastle	New South Wales	Australia	1804 AD	Fourth-oldest city in Australia.
Launceston	Tasmania	Australia	1806 AD	Fifth-oldest city in Australia.
Papeete	Society Islands	France	1818 AD	Established by the British missionary William Pascoe Crook on the land of the ruling Pōmare family.
Kerikeri	Northland	New Zealand	c. 1818 AD	Oldest European-founded settlement in New Zealand.
Levuka	Kubuna	Fiji	1825 AD	Oldest European settlement in Fiji.
Lahaina	Hawaiian Kingdom	United States	1823 AD	Established as the Hawaiian Kingdom's capital by Kamehameha II in an already significant whaling harbour where some of the first American missions where set.
Bluff	Southland	New Zealand	1824 AD	Previously known as Campbelltown, the oldest European-founded settlement in the South Island.
Brisbane	Queensland	Australia	1825 AD	Oldest city in Northern Australia, State Capital.
Albany	Western Australia	Australia	1826 AD	Oldest city on the West Coast of Australia.
Perth	Western Australia	Australia	1829 AD	The area had been inhabited by the Whadjuk Noongar people for over 40,000 years, as evidenced by archaeological findings on the Upper Swan River.
Melbourne	Victoria	Australia	1835 AD	Before the arrival of European settlers, the area was occupied for an estimated 31,000 to 40,000 years. At the time of European settlement, it was inhabited by under 20,000 hunter-gatherers from three indigenous regional tribes: the Wurundjeri, Boonwurrung and Wathaurong.
Kingscote	South Australia	Australia	1836 AD	First official European settlement in South Australia, Australia's first free settled colony. Situated on Kangaroo Island, it was occupied by an Aboriginal group from as long as 16,000 years ago until their disappearance 2,000–4,000 years ago.
Adelaide	South Australia	Australia	1836 AD	State Capital of South Australia, Australia's first free settled colony. European settlement began in 1836.
Geelong	Victoria	Australia	1838 AD	The second-largest city in Victoria.
Wellington	Wellington Region	New Zealand	1839 AD	New Zealand's capital city from 1865 until the present day.
Auckland	Auckland Region	New Zealand	1840 AD	New Zealand's capital city from 1841 to 1865. Prior to this, it was inhabited by Māori from about the 14th century.
Dunedin	Otago Region	New Zealand	1848 AD	First New Zealand centre to be officially named a city (1865). Briefly the country's largest settlement.
Bendigo	Victoria	Australia	1851 AD	Fourth-largest city in Victoria.
Darwin	Northern Territory	Australia	1869 AD	Territory Capital. The area was inhabited by the Larrakia people before the Scottish explorer John Clements Wickham named the area Port Darwin in 1839. It was not permanently settled by Europeans until the current settlement started as Palmerston in 1869. The city was renamed to Darwin in 1911.
Canberra	Australian Capital Territory	Australia	1913 AD	Capital city of Australia. Artifacts suggests early human activity occurred at some point in Canberra dating at around 21,000 years ago.

== Oldest by country ==
Oldest inhabited cities within each country
Present country	City	Earlier known as	Historical region	Inhabited since (Note: Earliest possible dates)
Afghanistan	Kandahar	Alexandria Arachosia	Arachosia	3000 BC
Albania	Shkodër	Skodra	Illyria	2250 BC
Angola	M'banza-Kongo	Nkumba a Ngudi	Kongo Empire	1390 AD
Argentina	Santiago del Estero	—N/a	Río de la Plata	1553 AD
Armenia	Yerevan	—N/a	Yerevan	782 BC
Australia	Sydney	—N/a	New South Wales	1788 AD
Benin	Ouidah	—N/a	Kingdom of Whydah	1500 AD
Bhutan	Jakar	Bumthang	Tibetan Empire	600 AD
Brazil	São Vicente, São Paulo	—N/a	Governorate General of Brazil	1532 AD
Brunei	Bandar Seri Begawan	—N/a	Po-ni and Bruneian Empire	977 AD
Bulgaria	Plovdiv	Eumolpias	Neolithic Europe, Iron Age Europe	6000 BC
Cambodia	Siem Reap	—N/a	Khmer Empire	801 AD
Canada	Quebec City	—N/a	New France	1608 AD
Cape Verde	Cidade Velha	Ribeira Grande	Santiago Island	1462 AD
Chile	Santiago	—N/a	Captaincy General of Chile	1541 AD
China	Zhengzhou and Yanshi	Bo and Xibo	Shang dynasty	1600 BC
Colombia	Santa Marta	—N/a	New Granada	1525 AD
Costa Rica	Cartago	—N/a	New Spain	1563 AD
Croatia	Zadar	Zara	Liburnia	900 BC
Cuba	Baracoa	—N/a	New Spain	1511 AD
Dominican Republic	Santo Domingo	—N/a	New Spain	1496 AD
Egypt	Girga	Thinis	Ancient Egypt	3273 BC
Ethiopia	Aksum	—N/a	Kingdom of Axum	400 BC
Fiji	Levuka	—N/a	Kubuna	1820 AD
France	Marseille	Massalia	Archaic Greece	600 BC
Georgia	Vani	—N/a	Colchis	700 BC
Greece	Argos	—N/a	Neolithic Europe, Mycenaean Greece	5000 BC
Guatemala	Flores	—N/a	Maya civilization, then New Spain	900 BC
India	Delhi	Indraprastha	Ancient india	1200 BC
Indonesia	Jakarta	—N/a	Tarumanagara	417 AD
Iran	Hamadan	Ecbatana	Media	800 BC
Iraq	Erbil	—N/a	Mesopotamia	2300 BC
Israel and Palestine	Jerusalem	—N/a	Levant	3000 BC
Italy	Matera	—N/a	Prehistoric Italy	1000 BC
Japan	Osaka	Osumi	Japan	390 AD
Kazakhstan	Sayram	—N/a	Transoxiana	1000 BC
Laos	Luang Prabang	—N/a	Muang Sua	698 AD
Lebanon	Byblos	—N/a	Levant	5000 BC
Libya	Benghazi	Euesperides	Cyrenaica	525 BC
Madagascar	Antananarivo	—N/a	Merina Kingdom	1610 AD
Malaysia	Muar	—N/a	Majapahit	1361 AD
Mali	Gao	—N/a	Gao Empire, Songhai Empire	600 AD
Malta	Mdina	—N/a	Ancient Malta	700 BC
Mexico	Cholula	—N/a	Old Cholula	1000 BC
Myanmar	Pyay	—N/a	Pyu city-states	638 AD
Nepal	Kathmandu-Lalitpur, Nepal	—N/a	Nepal	200 AD
New Zealand	Kerikeri	—N/a	Northland	1818 AD
Niger	Agadez	—N/a	Songhai Empire	1000 AD
Nigeria	Benin City	—N/a	Kingdom of Benin	1000 AD
North Korea	Pyeongyang	Wanggeom-seong	Gojoseon	194 BC
Pakistan	Multan	—N/a	Indus Valley Civilisation	3000 BC
Panama	Nombre de Dios, Colón	—N/a	New Spain	1510 AD
Paraguay	Asunción	—N/a	Viceroyalty of Rio de la Plata	1537 AD
Peru	Cusco	—N/a	Inca Empire	1100 AD
Philippines	Butuan	—N/a	Rajahnate of Butuan	1001 AD
Portugal	Lisbon	—N/a	Lusitania	700 BC
Puerto Rico	San Juan	—N/a	New Spain	1508 AD
Romania	Constanța	Tomis	Dobruja	600 BC
Russia	Derbent	—N/a	Caucasus	700 BC
Saudi Arabia	Dumat al-Jandal	—N/a	Al-Jawf	1000 BC
Serbia	Belgrade	—N/a	Illyria	279 BC
Singapore	Singapore	—N/a	Kingdom of Singapura	1170 AD
Somalia	Zeila	Avalites	Bilad al-Barbar	100 AD
South Africa	Cape Town	—N/a	Dutch East India Company	1652 AD
South Korea	Gyeongju	—N/a	Silla	57 BC
Spain	Cádiz	Gadir	Phoenicia	1100 BC
Sri Lanka	Anuradhapura	—N/a	Kingdom of Rajarata	400 BC
Sudan	Suakin	—N/a	Ancient Sudan	1000 AD
Syria	Aleppo	—N/a	Levant	5000 BC
Tajikistan	Dushanbe	—N/a	Achaemenid	1000 BC
Thailand	Nakhon Si Thammarat	—N/a	Tambralinga	775 AD
Turkey	Diyarbakır	Amida	Mesopotamia	8000 BC
Ukraine (Note: de jure. Russia de facto)	Kerch	—N/a	Crimea	610 BC
United Kingdom	Colchester	—N/a	Britain	20 BC
United States	Oraibi	—N/a	Puebloan peoples	1100 AD
Uzbekistan	Samarkand	—N/a	Sogdia	800 BC
Venezuela	Cumaná	—N/a	New Granada	1515 AD
Vietnam	Hanoi	—N/a	Âu Lạc	257 BC

== See also ==
- Historical urban community sizes
- List of cities in the Americas by year of foundation (includes ancient native sites)
- List of cities of the ancient Near East
- List of largest cities throughout history, including ones no longer inhabited
- List of oldest extant buildings
