= Chakan (Maya province) =

Former Maya jurisdiction on the Yucatán Peninsula

- 1461–1547
- Maya chiefdoms or kuchkabalob of Yucatán in the 16th century according to Ralph L. Roys.
- Capital: Ti’ho
- Common languages: Official language: Yucatec
- Religion: Maya religion
- Demonym: Chakan
- Government: Kuchkabal
- Batabob
- Historical era: Post classic and Early modern
  - Established: 1461
  - Spanish conquest of Yucatán: 1547
- Currency: Cocoa bean
| Preceded by | Succeeded by |
| League of Mayapan | New Spain |
- Today part of: Yucatán, Mexico

Chakán (Mayan languages: Chakán, ‘1) oregano of this land; 2) macaw tail feathers.’) is the name of one of the Mayan jurisdictions (kuchkabalob) that existed on the Yucatan Peninsula at the arrival of the Spanish conquistadors in the sixteenth century. Unlike other jurisdictions, Chakán did not seem to have a centralized government or control of a dominant Halach Uinik, as in the case of the provinces Ceh Pech or Ah Kin Chel. This is inferred from the fact that upon the Spaniards' arrival, Francisco de Montejo (el Mozo) was well received by some local leaders (batabob), but not others, such as Ah Kin Chuy, who organized resistance in the region's eastern towns to repel Spanish settlers.

The most important city in the jurisdiction may have been Caucel, which controlled the region's salt trade since this material came from Chuburná and Sisal. Caucel's batab, named Ah Kin Euán, was so open to the Spanish from the outset of the conquest that he converted to Catholicism and changed his name to Francisco Euán, maintaining his position as batab for much longer.

Mérida, the present day capital of Yucatan state, was founded on the ruins of Ti'Ho, a Mayan city that was virtually abandoned and had no recognizable leadership in the mid-16th century.

== Images ==
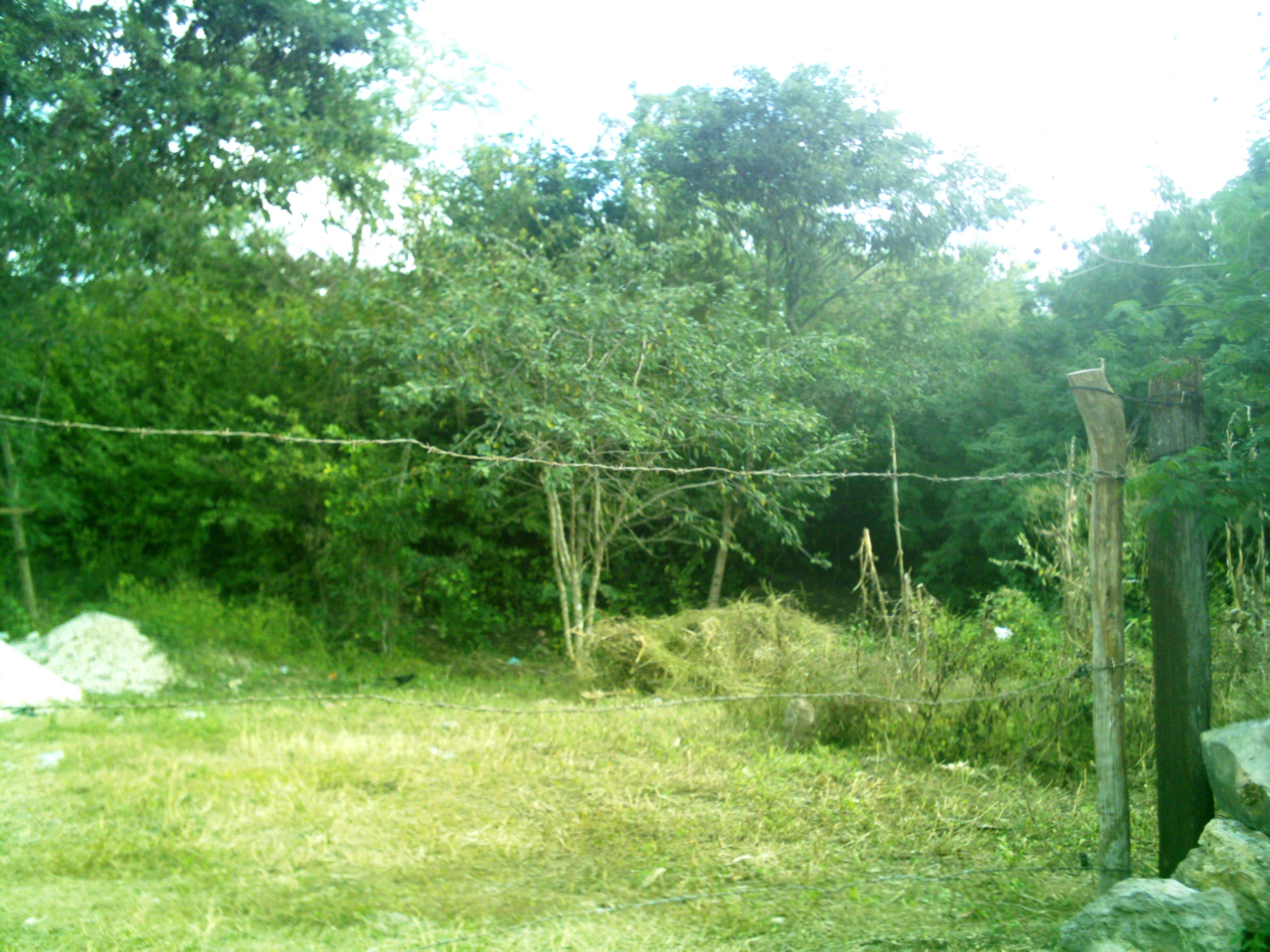
Mayan Ruins in Kanasín

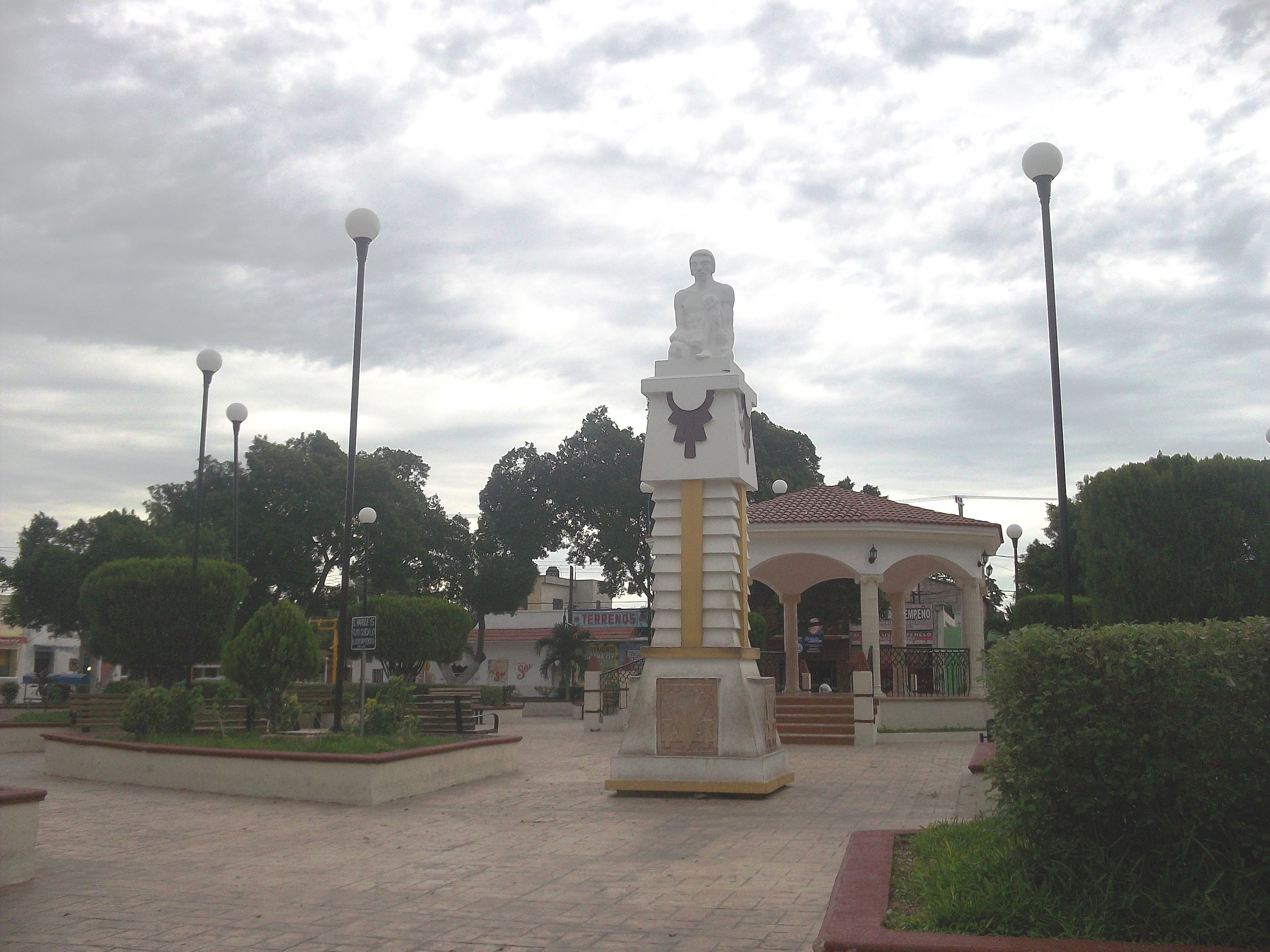
Monument to Nachi Cocom in the Parque principal in Kanasín

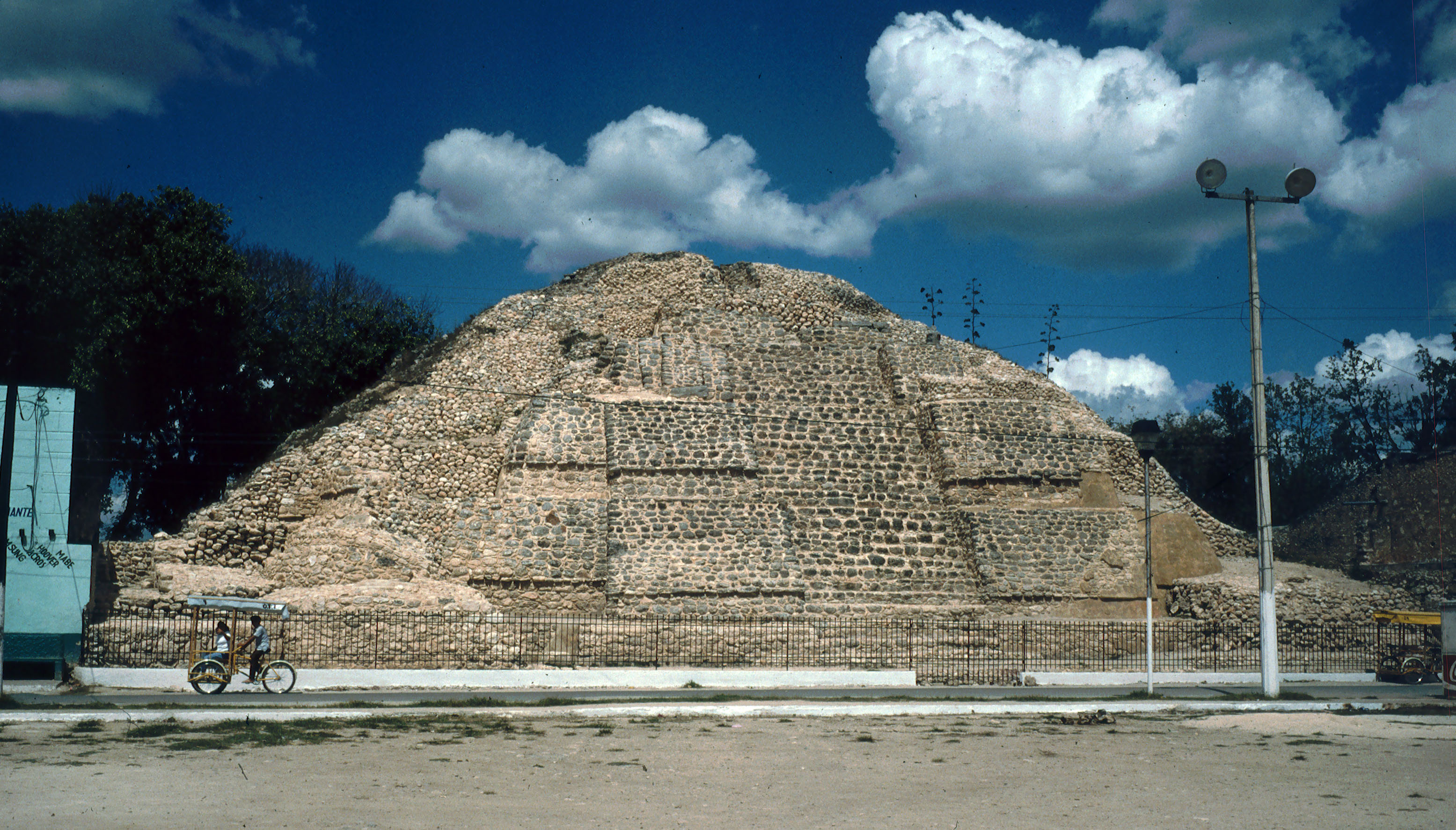
Temple pyramid in Acanceh (Mayan site)

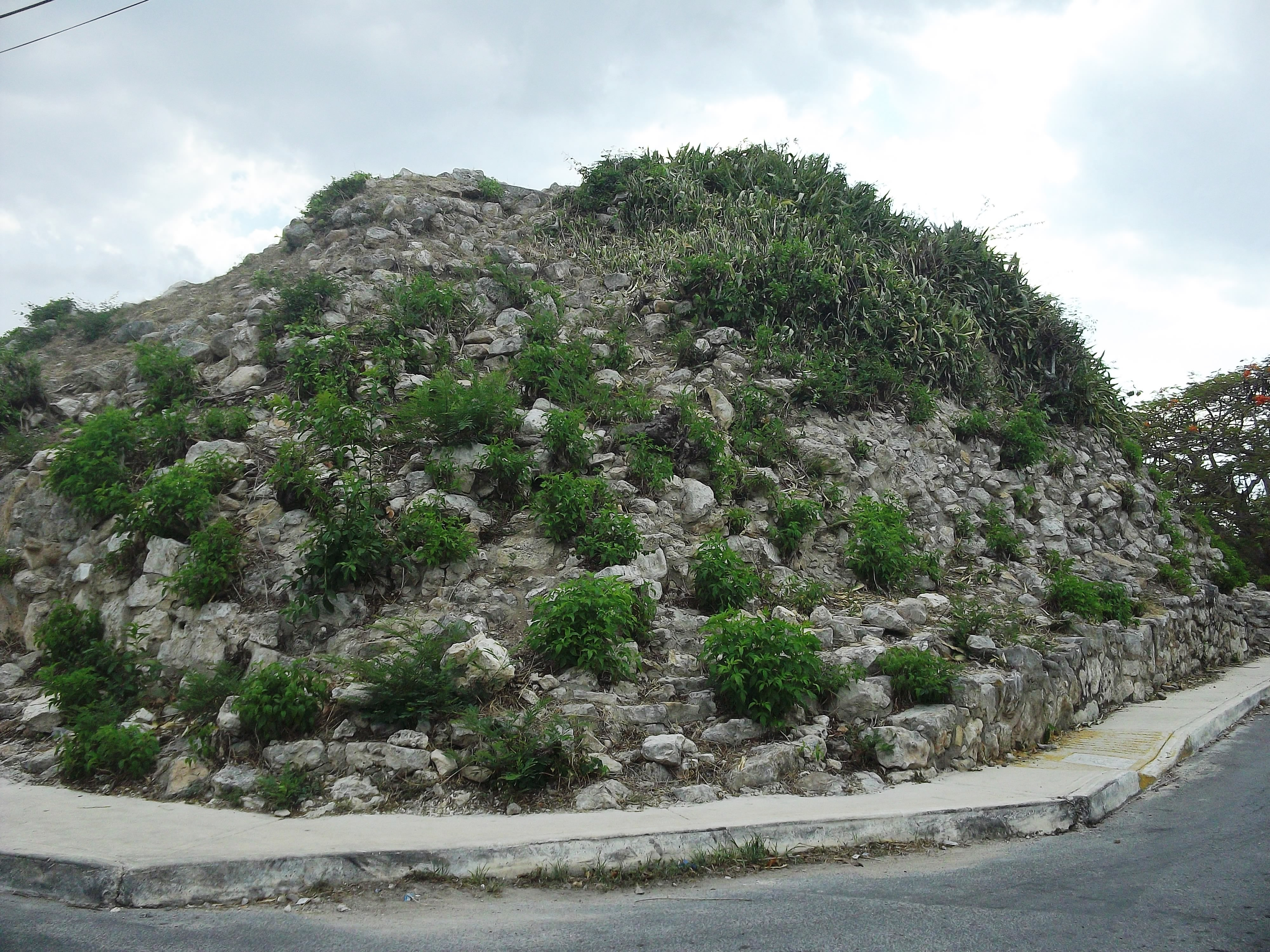
Maya-ruins of Caucel

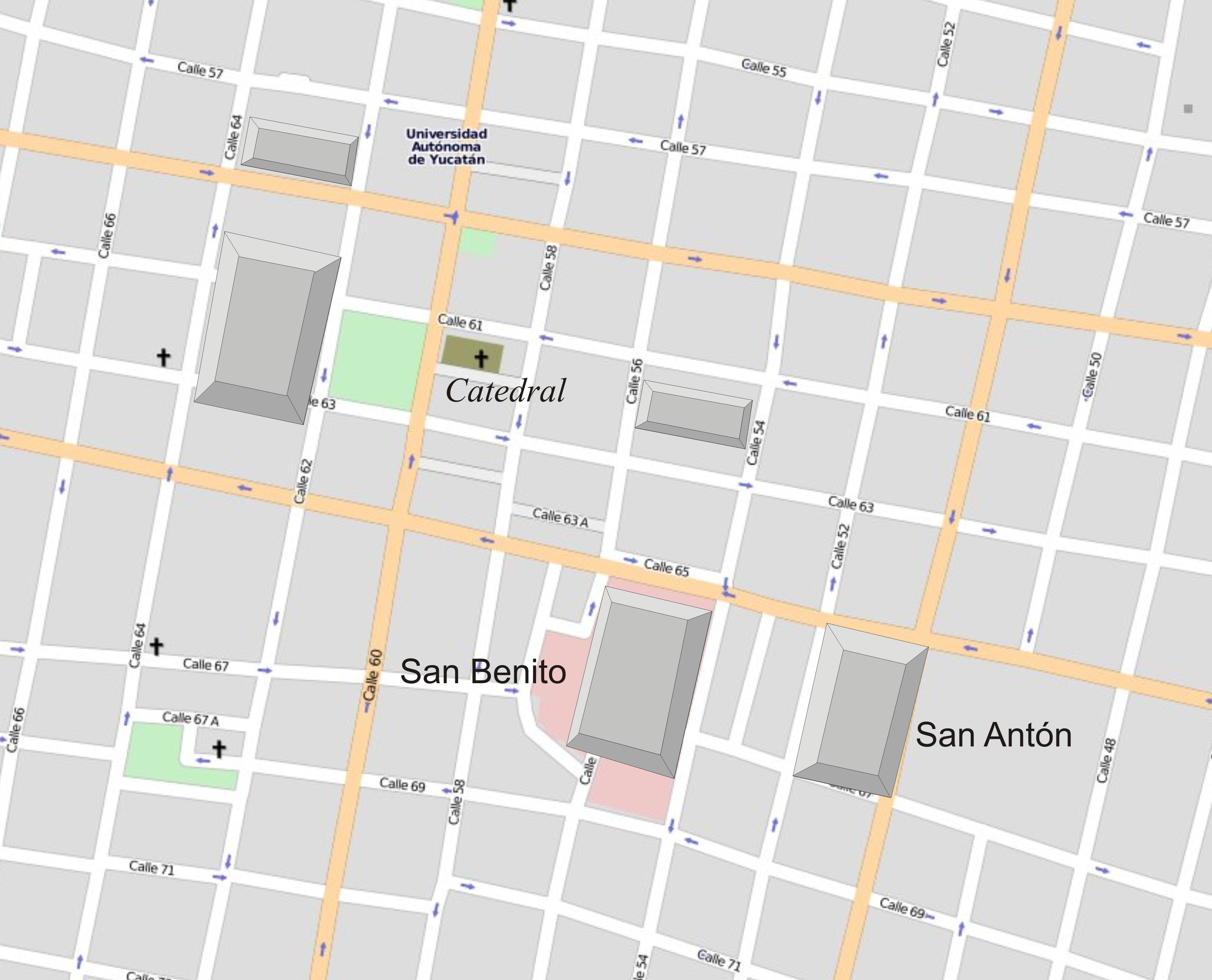
Schematic localization of the pre-Hispanic buildings in Mérida

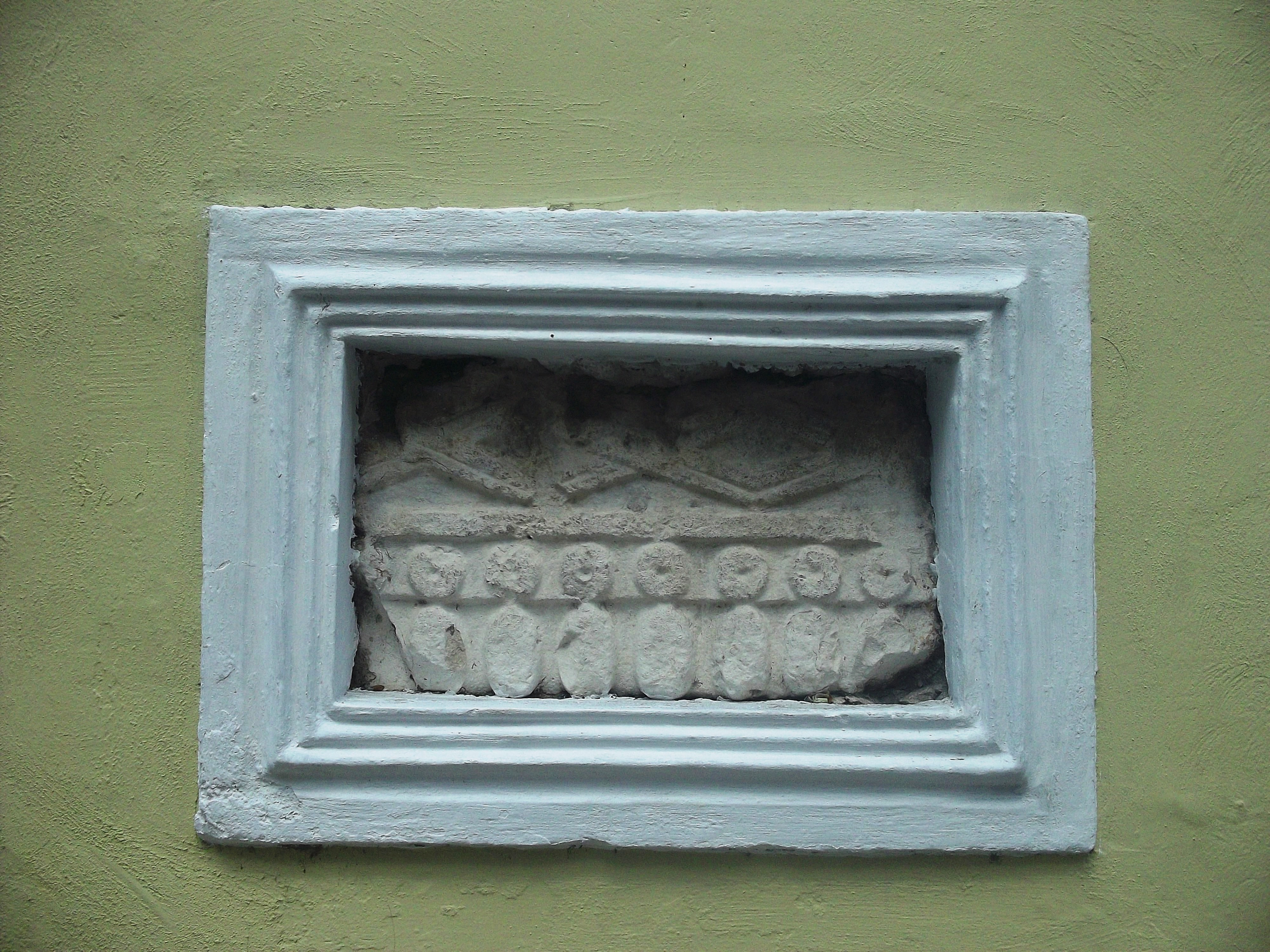
Mayan stucco in Spanish architecture in Mérida
