= Nachi Cocom =

Mayan theocratic leader

Juan Cocom
- "Nachi Cocom"
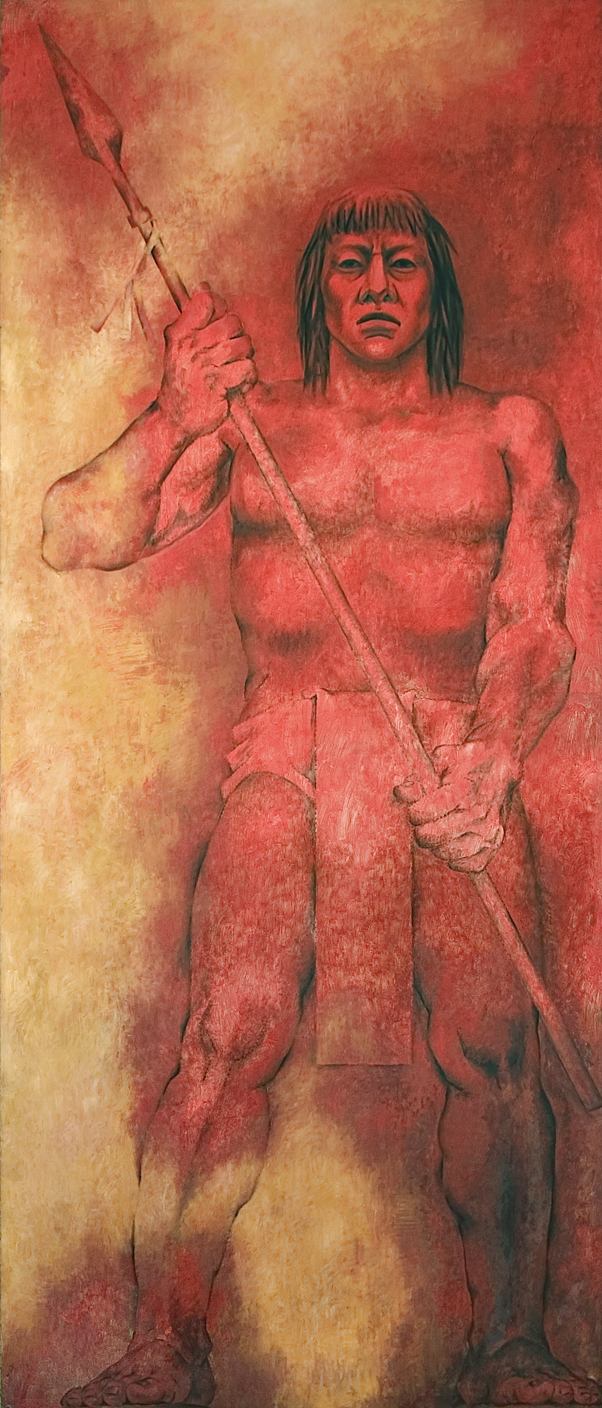
- 20th century representation by Fernando Castro Pacheco in Mérida’s Governor’s Palace

Sotuta Kuchkabal leader
- Succeeded by: Lorenzo Cocom

Halach Uinik

Personal details
- Born: "Nachi Cocom" c. 1510
- Died: 1562 Yucatán, New Spain
- Children: Francisco Cocom
- Mother tongue: Yucatec Maya
- Nickname: Juan Cocom

Military service
- Battles/wars: Battle of T’ho

Nachi Cocom (cerca 1510 - 1562), known to Spanish conquistadors as Juan Cocom, known to the locals as El Señor de Sotuta, was a halach uinik (Maya theocratic leader) of the Sotuta kuchkabal in modern day Yucatán, Mexico.

He fought the Spanish conquistadors but was defeated in a battle at the ruins of T’ho in the center of modern day Mérida, Yucatán in 1542, and subsequently baptized as Juan Cocom.

== Biography ==
Nachi Cocom is a descendant of the Cocom lineage that in previous centuries had led the League of Mayapan.

When the Spaniards conquered Yucatan, they met Nachi Cocom and distinguished him for his leadership. In 1536 (during the 5 years the Spaniards left Yucatan), he organized the massacre of the Xiu ambassadors in what was considered his estate in Otzmal. During the construction of Mérida in 1542, the Xius joined forces with the Spaniards to fight Cocom's army of men. Cocom organized the armed resistance to the Spanish conquistadors under Francisco de Montejo the Younger, but was defeated in a battle at the ruins of T’ho (modern day Mérida) on June 10–11, 1542. He survived the battle and eventually submitted to Spanish rule, becoming baptized as Juan Cocom. He is considered by some to be the “last” halach uinik of the Maya, though the Itzá of Nojpetén resisted Spanish dominion until 1697.

A statue of Nachi Cocom by Reynaldo Bolio Suárez "Pacceli" was erected in Chetumal in 2018.

== Literature ==
The Spanish bishop Diego de Landa wrote about his many interactions with Nachi Cocom.
