= Francisco de Montejo (the Nephew) =

- Born: Francisco de Montejo; 1514; Spain
- Died: 1572 (aged 57–58); Mérida, New Spain
- Occupation: Conquistador
- Relatives: Francisco de Montejo (uncle); Francisco de Montejo (cousin)

Francisco de Montejo (Spanish: [fɾanˈθisko ðe monˈtexo]; 1514–1572), known as "the Nephew" (el Sobrino) was a Spanish conquistador.

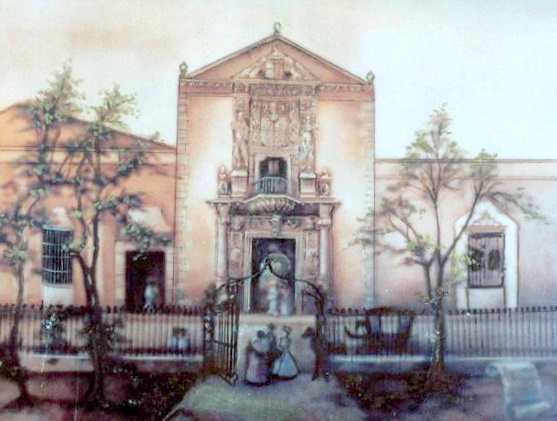
The 3 Montejo's house, circa 1548. Located in the Plaza Grande in Mérida, Yucatán. 19th century lithograph.

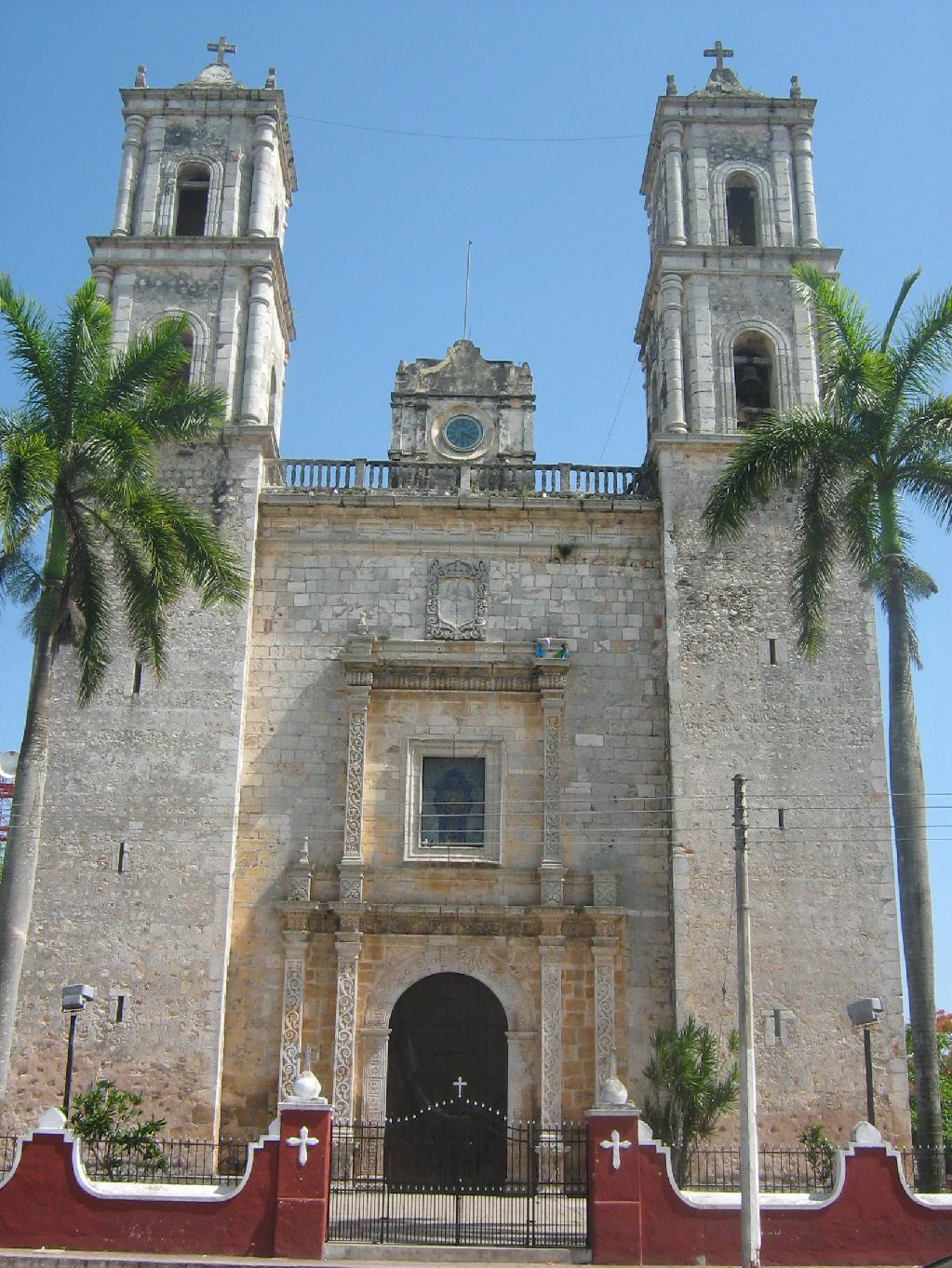
Church of San Gervasio in Valladolid, Yucatán.

At 13 years old, he embarked with his uncle, Francisco de Montejo "the Older" (el Adelantado) and his cousin, Francisco de Montejo y León "the Younger" (el Mozo), toward to the conquest of Yucatán in 1527. On May 28, 1543 he founded the town of Valladolid (now part of the Mexican state of Yucatán) on the banks of the Chouac-Ha lagoon. A year later, the town was moved further inland to the site of a Maya town, Zací. Valladolid is still known in the contemporary Yucatec Maya language as Saki, the modernized spelling of Zací.

In the third phase of the conquest of Yucatán, he attended the first garrison in San Pedro Champotón, a locality in which the native people began to pay tribute to the Spaniards. Because "El Adelantado" and "El Mozo" were pooling resources and soldiers, the offensive of the campaign took a long time to start, and their position was endangered by Maya caciques. Anticipating that the caciques would conspire against the Spaniards, "El Sobrino" kidnapped the principal lords of the area and led them to his cousin in Tabasco, where they renewed vows of obedience to the crown. The name of Champotón would change from "San Pedro" to "Salamanca de Champotón" after this incident.

Finally, with resources obtained, "El Sobrino" began the third and final campaign of the conquest, moving from the west to the east of the peninsula alongside "El Mozo" and other captains sent by "El Adelantado." "El Sobrino" was usually at the forefront of these military campaigns.

"El Sobrino" lived his final years in Mérida, where he died as a councilman in 1572, at the age of 55.

== See also ==
- Montejo expedition – in 1527 to Yucatán
- Davila entrada – in which this conquistador participated
