= Totonac Quiahuiztlan =

Quiahuitzlan is an abandoned Amerindian settlement in Veracruz state. Owing to its importance in the Spanish-Mexica war and the mausoleum style tombs, the site has attracted interest from tourists, historians, and archaeologists.

Quiahuitzlan was invaded in the classical period by the Toltecs and invaded by the Mexica in the Postclassical period. The settlement is located on a large hill that overlooks the Gulf of Mexico. The first Spanish colony in Mexico, Villa Rica de la Veracruz, was founded near this settlement by Hernán Cortés.

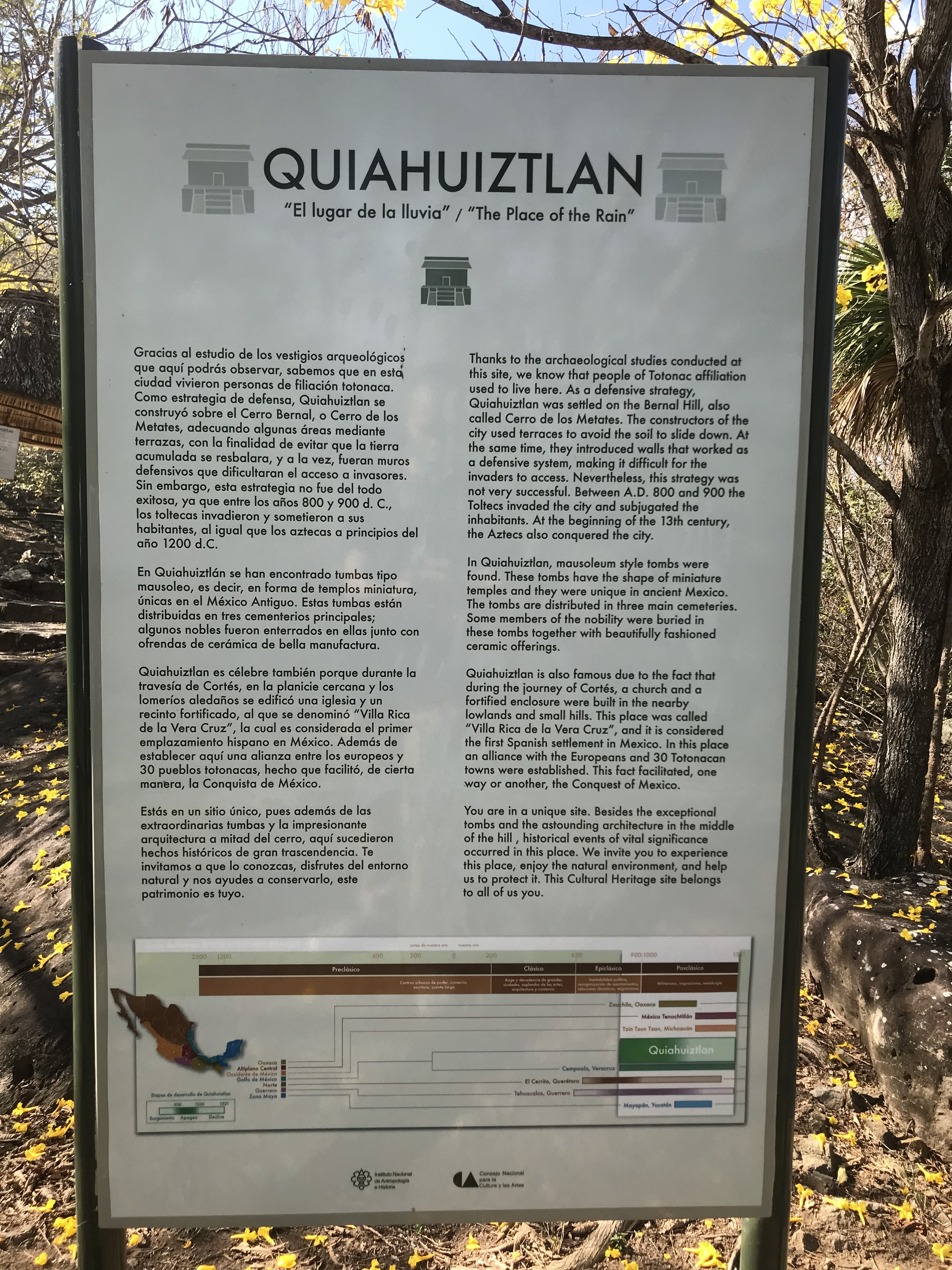

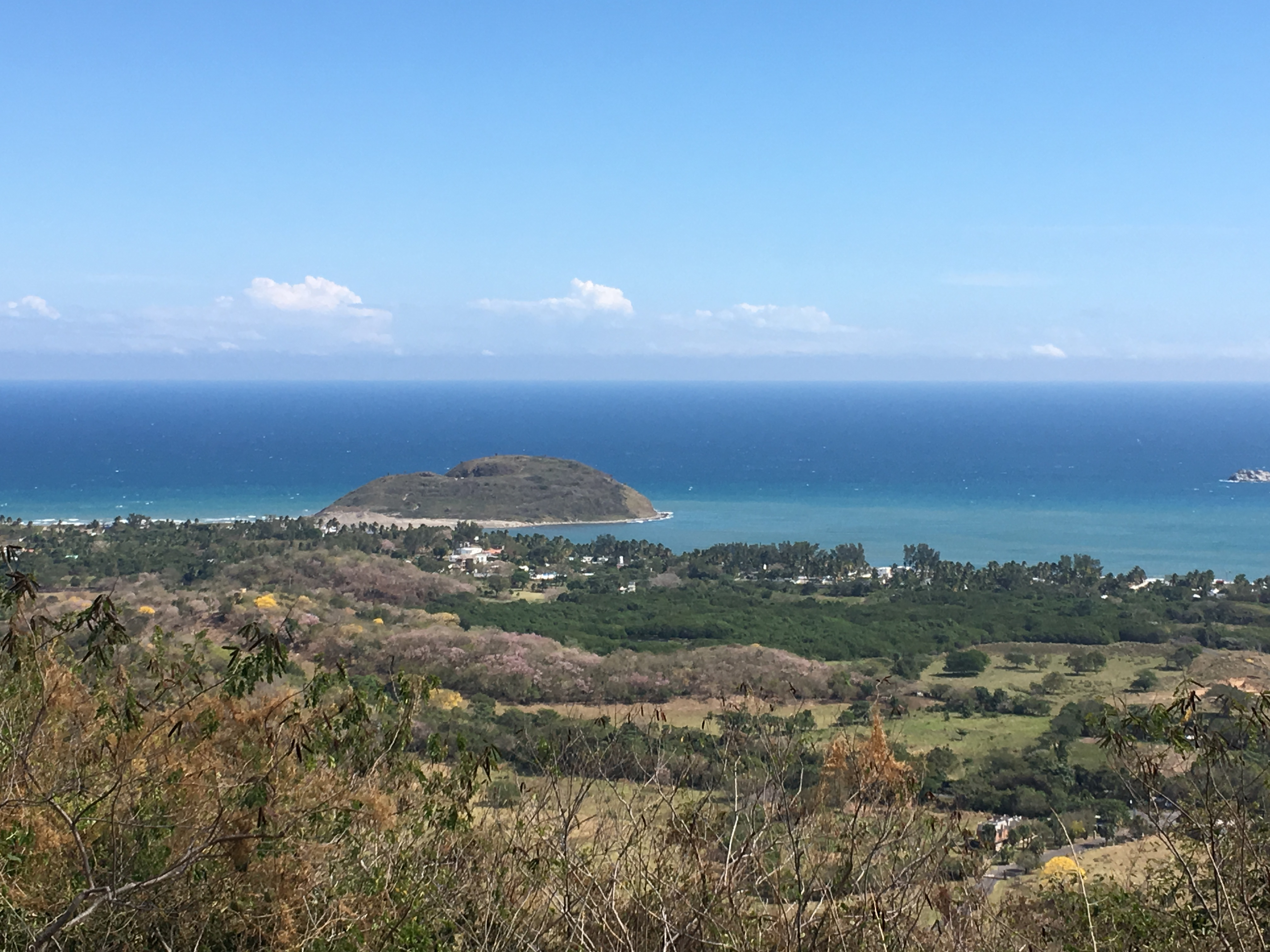
