= Francisco de Montejo =

Spanish Conquistador in Mexico and Central America (c. 1479- c. 1553)

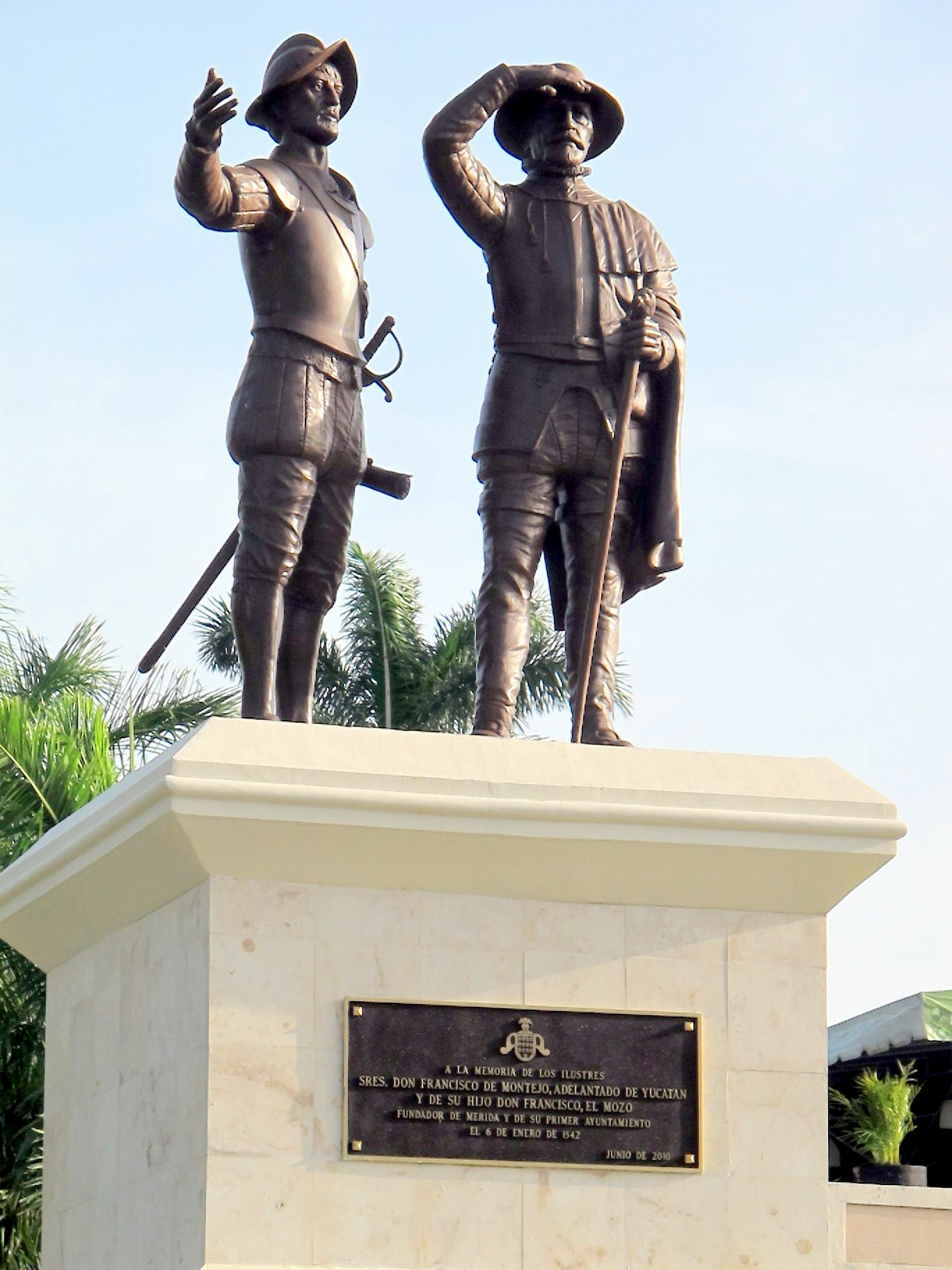
- A monument of Montejo in Mérida, Yucatán, Mexico.
- Born: Francisco de Montejo y Álvarez c. 1479; Salamanca, Crown of Castille
- Died: c. 1553 (aged 73–74); Spain
- Occupation: Conquistador
- Relatives: Francisco de Montejo (son); Francisco de Montejo (nephew)

Francisco de Montejo (Spanish: [fɾanˈθisko ðe monˈtexo]; c. 1479 – c. 1553) was a Spanish conquistador in Mexico and Central America.

== Early years ==
Francisco de Montejo was born about 1473 to a family of lesser Spanish nobility in Salamanca, Spain. He never documented his parentage during his lifetime but his father was probably Juan de Montejo. His mother is unknown but her surname may have been Téllez. He had a brother, Juan, who served with him in the New World and a sister, Maria, whose son Francisco de Montejo would become an important conquistador in Yucatán.

In 1513, Montejo joined an expedition being organized in Seville under the leadership of Pedrarias Davila who had received a royal appointment to govern Castilla de Oro, a new Spanish colony in Central America. Montejo was sent on ahead to Santo Domingo to recruit additional men for the colony. Later, Pedrarius sent him on an unsuccessful expedition to the region that would later become Nueva Granada.

Montejo became disillusioned with opportunities under Pedrarius and left for Cuba where he participated under Diego Velázquez de Cuéllar in the conquest of Cuba. The conquest was almost complete when Montejo arrived but he gained the favor of Velázquez and was rewarded with encomiendas and extensive grants of land.

In 1518, when Francisco Hernández de Córdoba reported his discovery of new lands in the west, Montejo joined Juan de Grijalva's expedition to explore the coast of Yucatán. He invested his own money to help outfit the small fleet and was designated captain of one of the four ships. When they reached the Mexican coastline, Montejo became the first Spaniard to step ashore in the Aztec Empire and establish friendly relations with the Indians he encountered.

On his return to Cuba, Montejo joined the Hernán Cortés expedition in an attempt to seize control of the newly-discovered lands. He became one of Cortés's most important lieutenants, serving as captain of one ship and its company of soldiers. He fought in the bloody campaign in Tabasco and was then sent north with two small ships to find a suitable site for a permanent town. The site he identified became Villa Rica de la Vera Cruz and Montejo was appointed one of its first alcaldes (chief town administrators). Throughout this early phase of the conquest, Cortés showed high regard for Montejo.

In July 1519, Montejo was sent to the Spanish Court to provide news of the conquest and defend Cortés's authority against claims by Velázquez. He also presented the emperor with a rich treasure of gold, silver and jewels that had already been seized in New Spain Montejo successfully represented Cortés in Castile until 1522 when he returned to the new City of Mexico, established on the ruins of the old Aztec capital. Cortés rewarded him handsomely with the assignment of encomiendas, notably the rich and populous town of Azcapotzalco.

By this time, Montejo was a wealthy and prestigious conquistador. In addition to his holdings in New Spain, he held encomiendas in Cuba and properties in Salamanca, Spain. For a couple years Montejo appeared ready to settle in New Spain. He built a luxurious home in Mexico City and developed his haciendas and mines. However, in 1524 he was again sent to Spain to defend Cortés against charges that he had become too powerful and independent of the Crown's best interests. Montejo was successful in his advocacy and also won special favor at Court for tact and obvious talents. In 1525 in Seville Montejo married Beatriz de Herrera, the wealthy widow of conquistador Alonso Esquivel. In 1526 he was awarded his own coat of arms.

== Yucatán ==
After settling affairs for Cortés, Montejo began to search for his next opportunity. The conquest by Cortés had set the standard for success and other ambitious conquistadors wanted to emulate him. Montejo thought that Yucatán provided such an opportunity. The coastline was dotted with towns and the interior was rumored to contain wealthy civilizations and spectacular cities.

In 1526 Montejo traveled to Grenada to petition the Spanish king, Charles V, for permission to conquer and colonize Yucatán. His request was supported by Pánfilo de Narváez, another veteran conquistador. Montejo argued persuasively that Yucatán would serve as a center of trade for the region and enrich the Crown. His formal petition was submitted on November 19, 1526 and quickly approved by Charles and the Council of the Indies on December 8.

Montejo was appointed Adelantado of Yucatán, governor and captain general of the new province, and authorized to conquer, settle, and govern at his own expense. His titles and offices were to be held for life. The Crown would not bear any expenses except to pay him a salary of 250,000 maravedis for the offices of governor and captain general. However, other valuable rights, privileges, and exemptions were granted. His contract also stipulated that the principal objective of the Crown was to bring the indigenous peoples of the New World into the Catholic Church. The appropriate treatment of the Indians was carefully spelled out and Montejo was warned to adhere to the spirit and letter of these instructions.

Montejo returned to Seville to organize his expedition. His contract stipulated that the conquest must begin within one year (by December 8, 1527) so he had to move quickly. He raised 28,000 castellanos, a significant amount of money at the time, acquired and outfitted four ships and recruited 250 men in addition the crews for the ships. Alonso Dávila was named his principal lieutenant. Careful to heed royal instructions, three clergymen were included to address the religious needs of the conquerors and the conquered. Montejo and his fleet set sail from Seville towards the end of June, 1526.

The crossing was uneventful and the fleet stopped first at Hispaniola where supplies were purchased, additional men were recruited and enough horses were procured to bring their small cavalry up to fifty strong. They soon set off again and reached Cozumel in late September. From there Montejo crossed the channel to the mainland and established their first town, Salamanca, named after Montejo's hometown. The site was poorly chosen; the climate was hot and humid and freshwater was scarce. At first the local natives were willing to provide food but Spanish demands quickly turned their attitude from cooperation to resentment and outright hostility. Oviedo later reported that "all [the Spaniards] fell ill and many died."

He returned to Yucatán in 1528, and attempted to conquer it from its east coast at Tulum and Chetumal, but was driven back by fierce resistance from the Maya living along this coast. In 1530, he decided to try conquering Yucatán from the west, and began by pacifying what is today the modern Mexican state of Tabasco. He continued this attempted conquest of western Yucatán from 1531 until 1535, when his forces were driven from Yucatán despite some prior successes.

== Governor of Honduras, Return to Yucatán, and death ==
In 1533, Montejo received a royal decree giving him permission to conquer Puerto Caballos and Naco in Honduras. This put him in conflict with Pedro de Alvarado, who had received a similar decree in 1532 and later declared in 1536 that he had conquered and pacified the province of Honduras. Alvarado continued to serve as the Governor of Honduras until 1540, although he was recalled to Spain in 1537. In 1540, the Spanish King awarded the Governorship of Honduras to Montejo, and he traveled to Gracias a Dios to install an administration loyal to him.

It would fall to Montejo's eponymous son, nicknamed "El Mozo" (born 1508, died 1565), to conquer Yucatán. He founded the city of San Francisco de Campeche in 1540, and Mérida in 1542. In 1546, the elder Montejo assumed the title of Governor and Captain General of Yucatán. However, by 1550, complaints about Montejo caused him to be recalled to Spain, where he died in 1553.

Montejo was survived by his son, "El Mozo," and a daughter, Catalina Montejo y Herrera.

== See also ==
- Dávila entrada – commissioned by this conquistador
