= T'ho =

Ancient Mayan City

T'ho (Mayan pronunciation: [tiˈhoʔ]) is a Mayan settlement located in the northwest of the Yucatán Peninsula, commonly indicated also with the alternative names of Tiho or Ichcansiho (also spelled Ichkanzihóo or Ichcaanzihó), this latter name being used in prophecies. The name T'ho seems to derive from ti (at) and the patronym Ho. At the time of the Spanish conquest, Tiho belonged to the kuchkabal of Chakan. Its buildings were built out of pole and thatch. Supposedly it had flourished under the rule of Chichen Itza, but local infighting had led to a decline. In 1572, the governor was Francisco Pech and in 1580 the cacique was Andrés Tun.

Mérida, the capital of the Mexican state of Yucatán and its largest city, was built on the ruins of this Mayan settlement and founded in 1542 by Francisco de Montejo.
