= Francisco de Montejo the Younger =

Spanish Conquistador known for helping to launch the Conquest of Yucatán

Francisco de Montejo
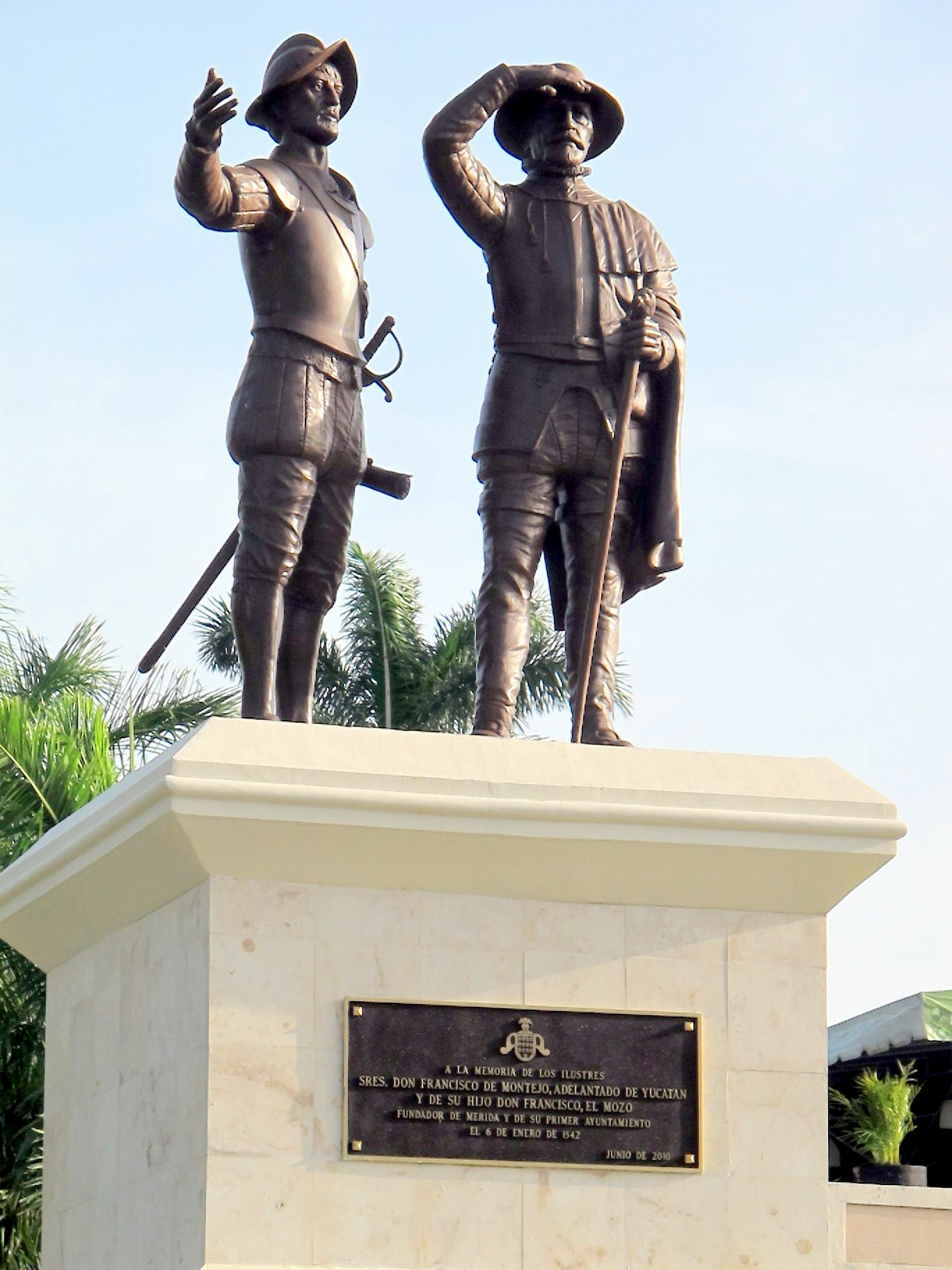
- A monument of Montejo in Mérida, Yucatán, Mexico.
- Born: Francisco de Montejo y León; 1508; Spain
- Died: 8 February 1565 (aged 56–57); Captaincy General of Guatemala, New Spain
- Other name: El Mozo
- Occupation: Conquistador
- Relatives: Francisco de Montejo (father); Francisco de Montejo (cousin)

Francisco de Montejo y León (Spanish pronunciation: [fɾanˈθisko ðe monˈtexoj leˈon]; 1508 – 8 February 1565), known as "the Younger" (el Mozo), was a Spanish conquistador, who in 1542 founded the city of Mérida, capital of State of Yucatán, Mexico. The son of Francisco de Montejo, ca. June 1527 he sailed with his father and his cousin Francisco de Montejo "the Nephew" from Sanlúcar de Barrameda to Cozumel, launching the first military campaign of the conquest of Yucatán.

In 1528 he came to the now lost city of Santa Maria de la Victoria (the first Spanish city in Mexican territory in the current state of Tabasco, founded at the mouth of the San Pedro River near the town of Salamanca de Xicalango), with the mission of pacifying the area, becoming in 1530 the leader of the campaign when his father left for the conquest of Yucatán.

However, when he had already pacified virtually the entire region of Grijalva River, the First Court dismissed his father while he was in Honduras and appointed Baltazar Osorio as mayor of Tabasco, forcing El Mozo to leave Santa Maria de la Victoria and await his father's instructions.

In 1535 after an uprising of the indigenous against the Spanish authorities in Tabasco, by order of the Second Court, Montejo the Elder was restored to office, and sent his son El Mozo to again attempt the pacification of the province that was partially achieved in 1537. In 1539 he was awarded the title of captain general and governor of Tabasco, but in 1540 he left Tabasco to accompany his father on a new attempt at the conquest of Yucatán.

In 1542 El Mozo achieved the surrender of western Yucatán Peninsula (now part of the state of Yucatán) and founded on the former Mayan city of Ichkansihóo (T'Hó) (then practically abandoned) the city of Mérida. After the conquest, he continued to live in Mérida, but later moved to Guatemala, where he died after a long illness on 8 February 1565.

== See also ==
- Montejo expedition – in 1527 to Yucatán
