= Gustave Umbdenstock =

French architect

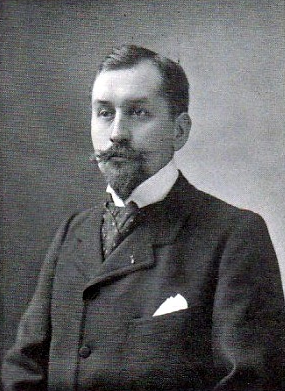
Gustave Umbdenstock

Gustave Umbdenstock (24 December 1866, Colmar - 16 November 1940, Paris) was a French architect most familiar for his railway stations.

== Biography ==
His father, also named Gustave, was a cloth merchant. From 1885, he was a student of Julien Guadet at the École des Beaux-Arts; receiving his diploma in architecture in 1893, and becoming an assistant professor there in 1894. He won the Prix de Rome in 1896, with his design for a naval school. The following year, he married Marie Charlotte Jeanne Normand, the daughter of one of his father's associates.

In 1898, he was commissioned by the Ministries of War and the Navy to construct the "Palais des armées de terre et de mer" (Palace of the Army and Navy) for the Exposition Universelle of 1900. As a reward for his work, he was named a Knight in the Legion of Honor. Drawing on his work there, he was named Chief Architect for the construction of the "Palais de France" at the Louisiana Purchase Exposition (1904) in St. Louis.

After 1901, much of his career was devoted to teaching at the École polytechnique, where he became a full Professor in 1919, and taught until his retirement in 1937. In 1909, he became the workshop manager at the École des Beaux-Arts; a position he held until his death. Two of his best known students were Paul Metz and Étienne de Kalbermatten In 1903, he wrote a textbook for their classes (Cours d'architecture, Gauthier-Villars et Cie).

For many years, he worked as an architect for the Chemins de Fer du Nord, built several stations for them, and participated in reconstructing their network of stations after World War I. During that time, he also served as a member of the "Council of Buildings and Lycées" at the Ministry of Public Instruction; in charge of the construction of high schools and other public buildings. In 1935, he succeeded Henri-Paul Nénot (deceased) in Seat #5 at the Académie des Beaux-Arts, architecture section.

His last major project involved a silo at the Seegmuller Pier, in Strasbourg (1932). As a painter, he was an accomplished watercolorist; making landscapes during his travels. A street in Colmar is named after him.

== Selected projects ==
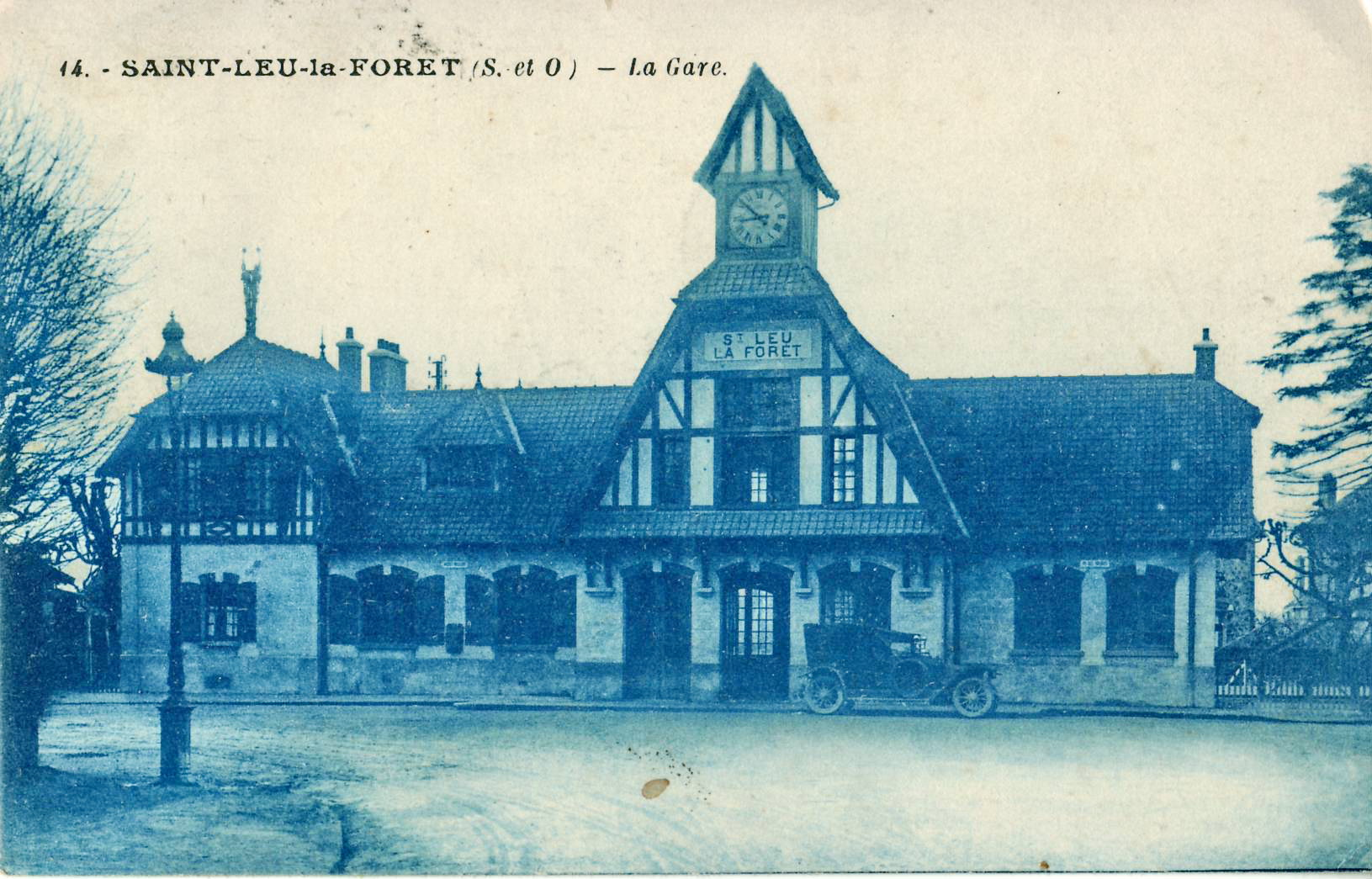
Gare de Saint-Leu-la-Forêt

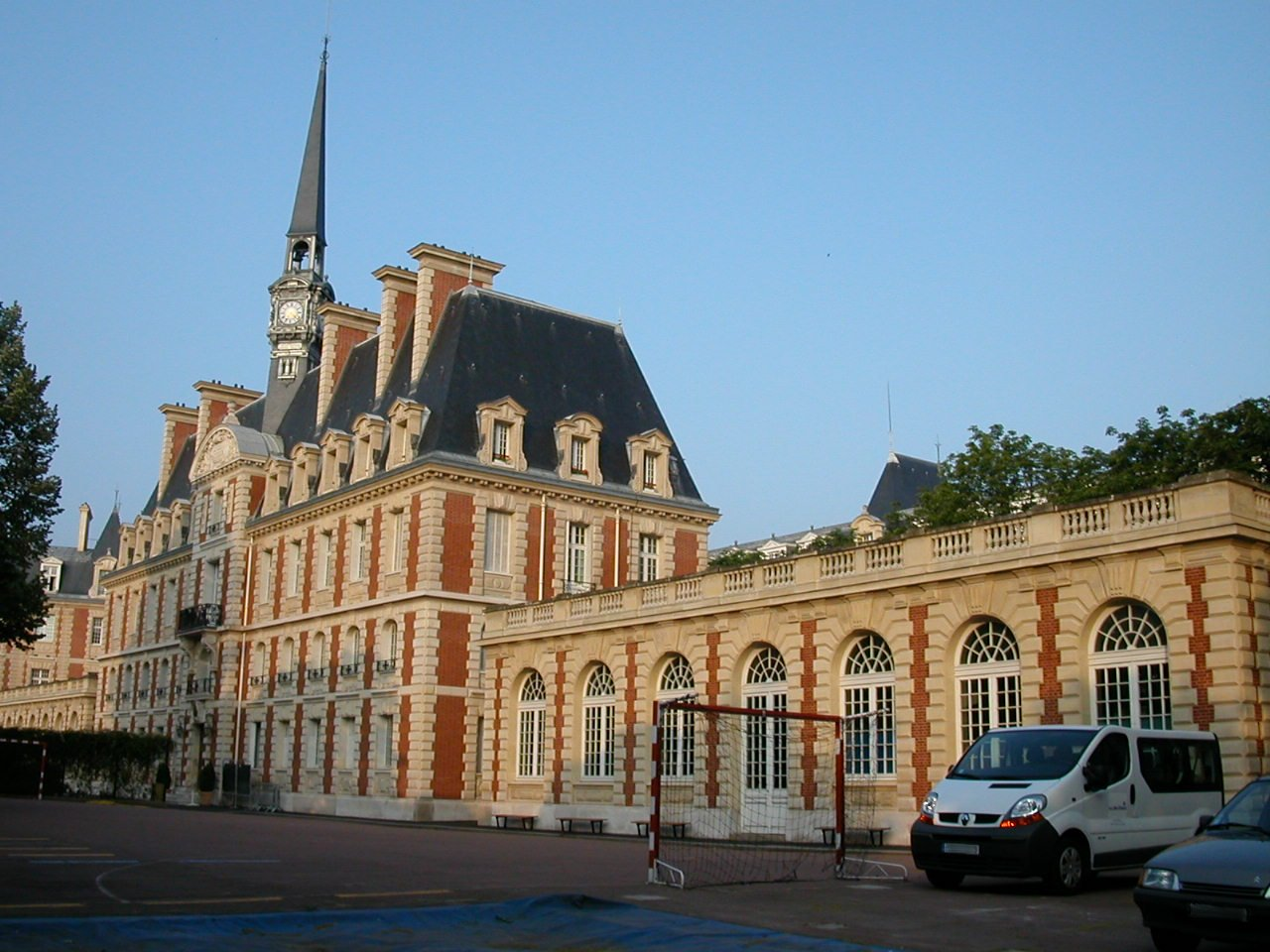
Lycée Pasteur, Neuilly-sur-Seine

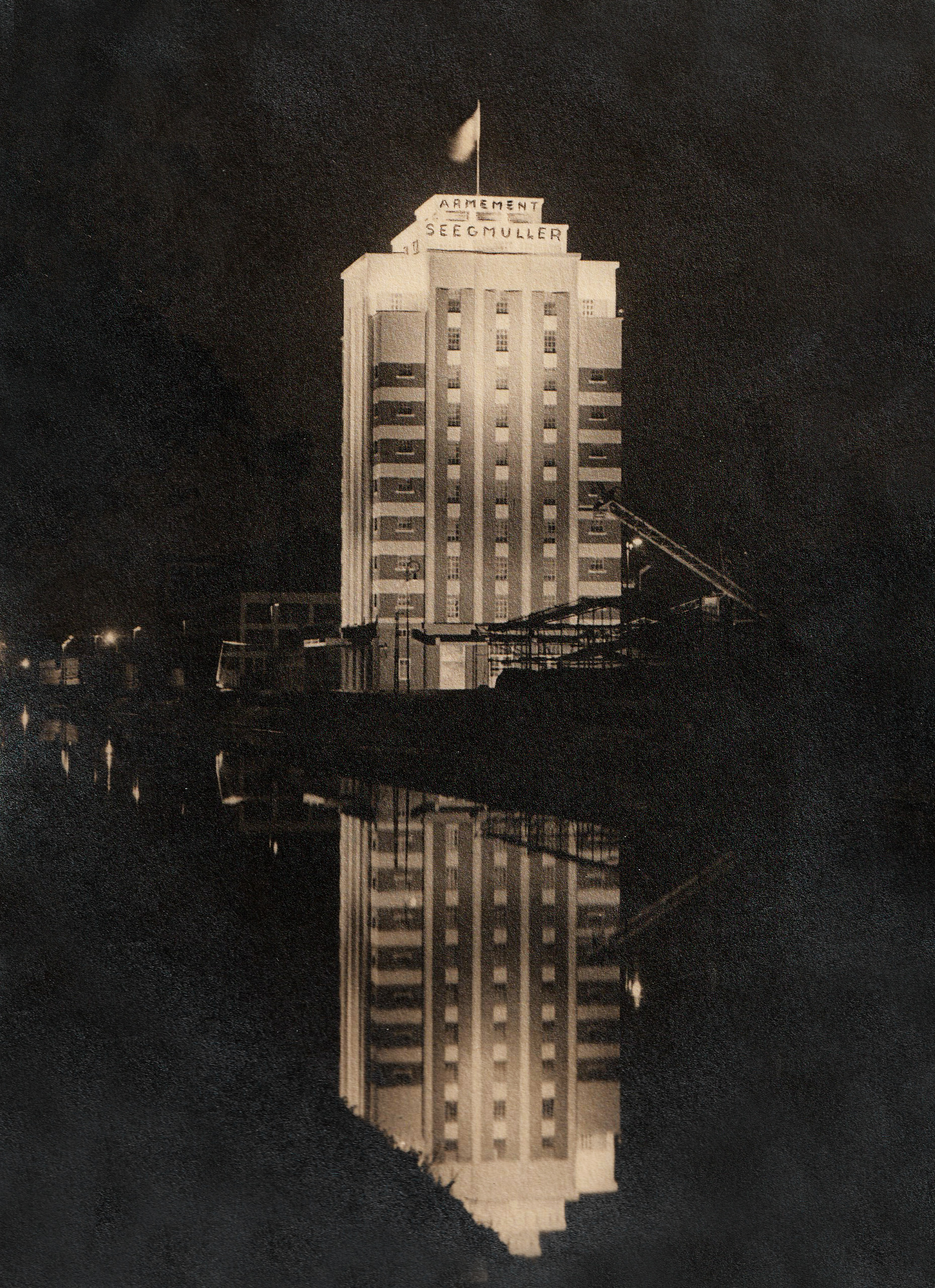
Seegmuller Tower

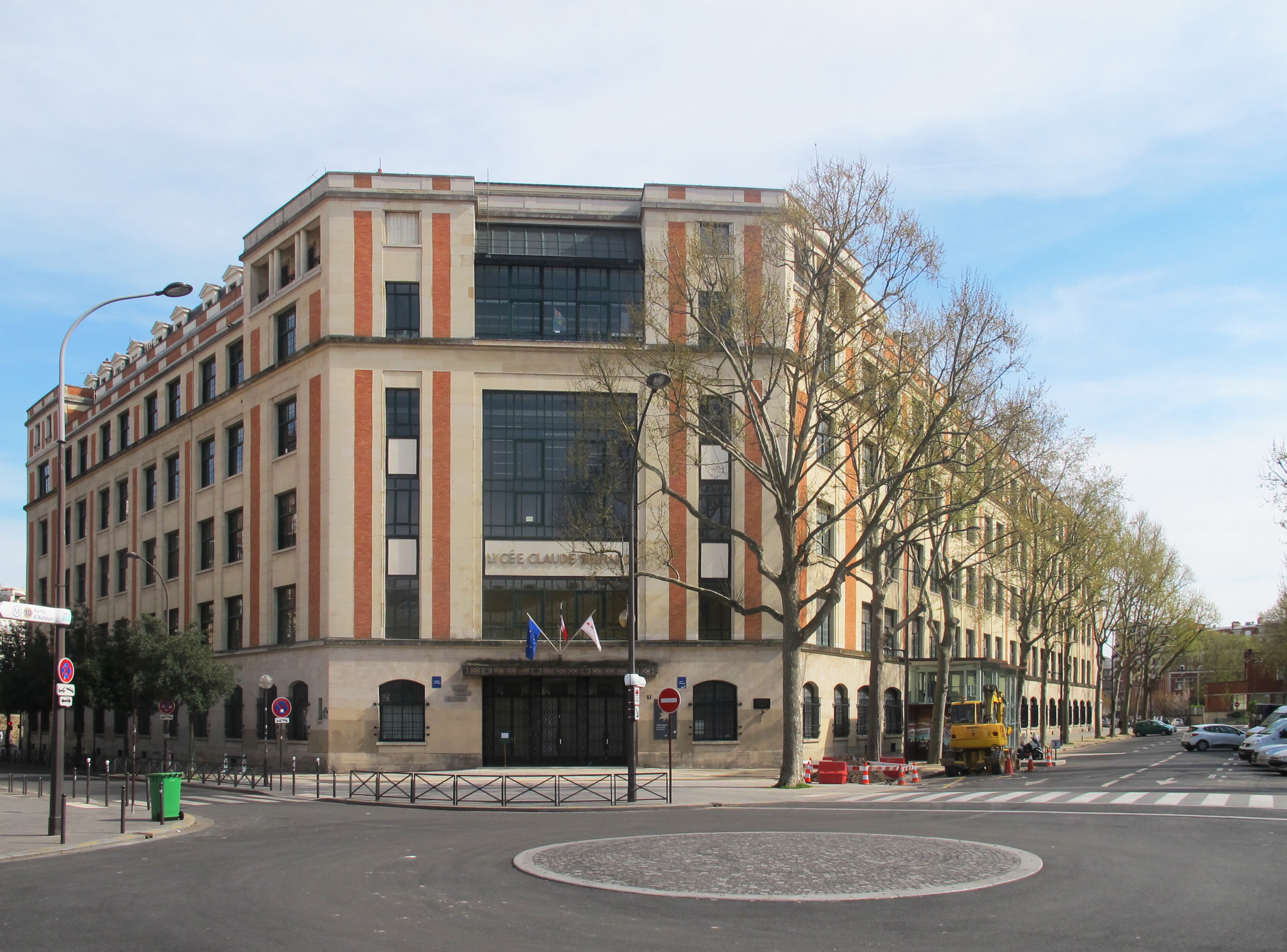
Lycée Claude-Bernard

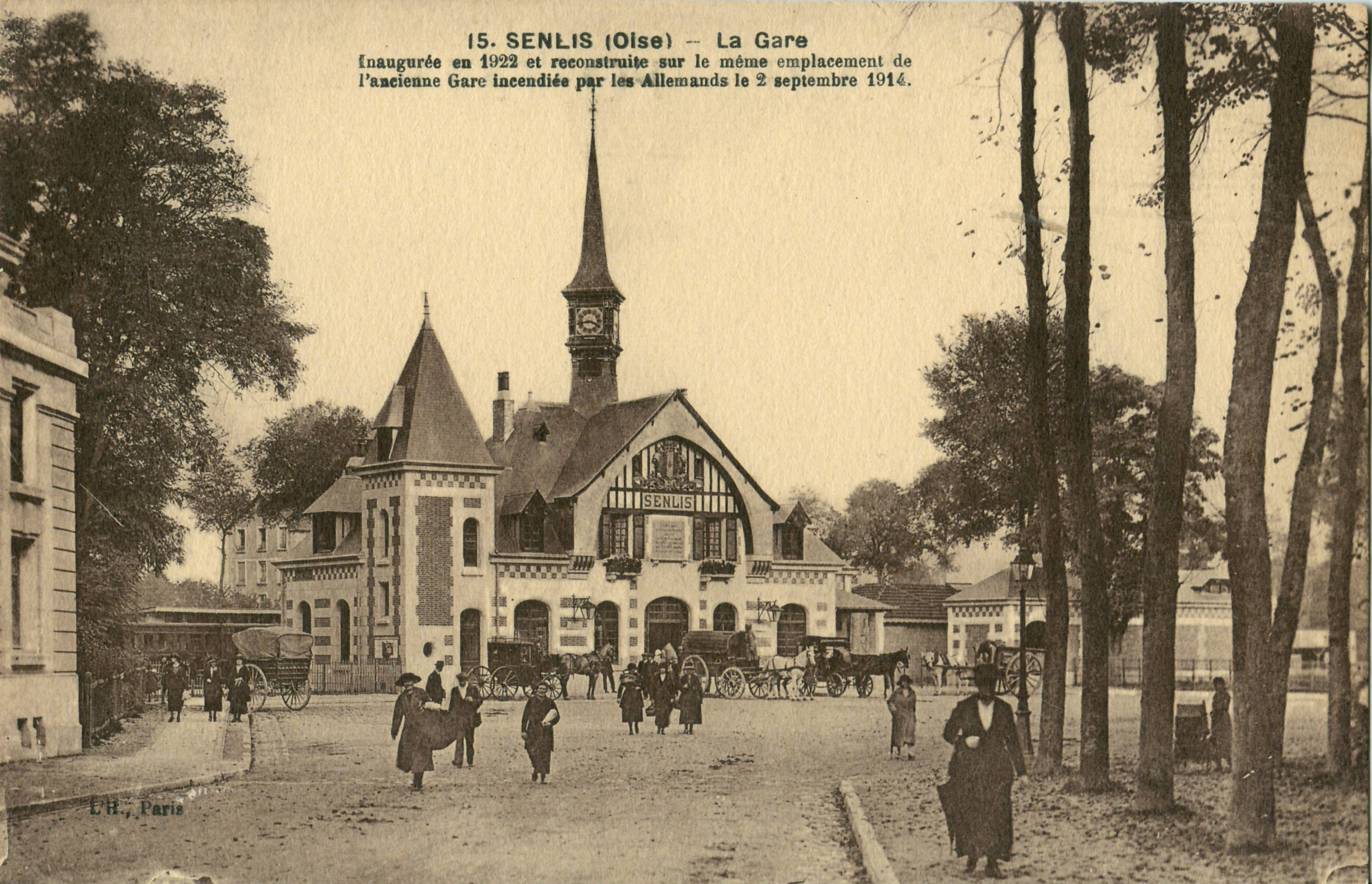
Gare de Senlis

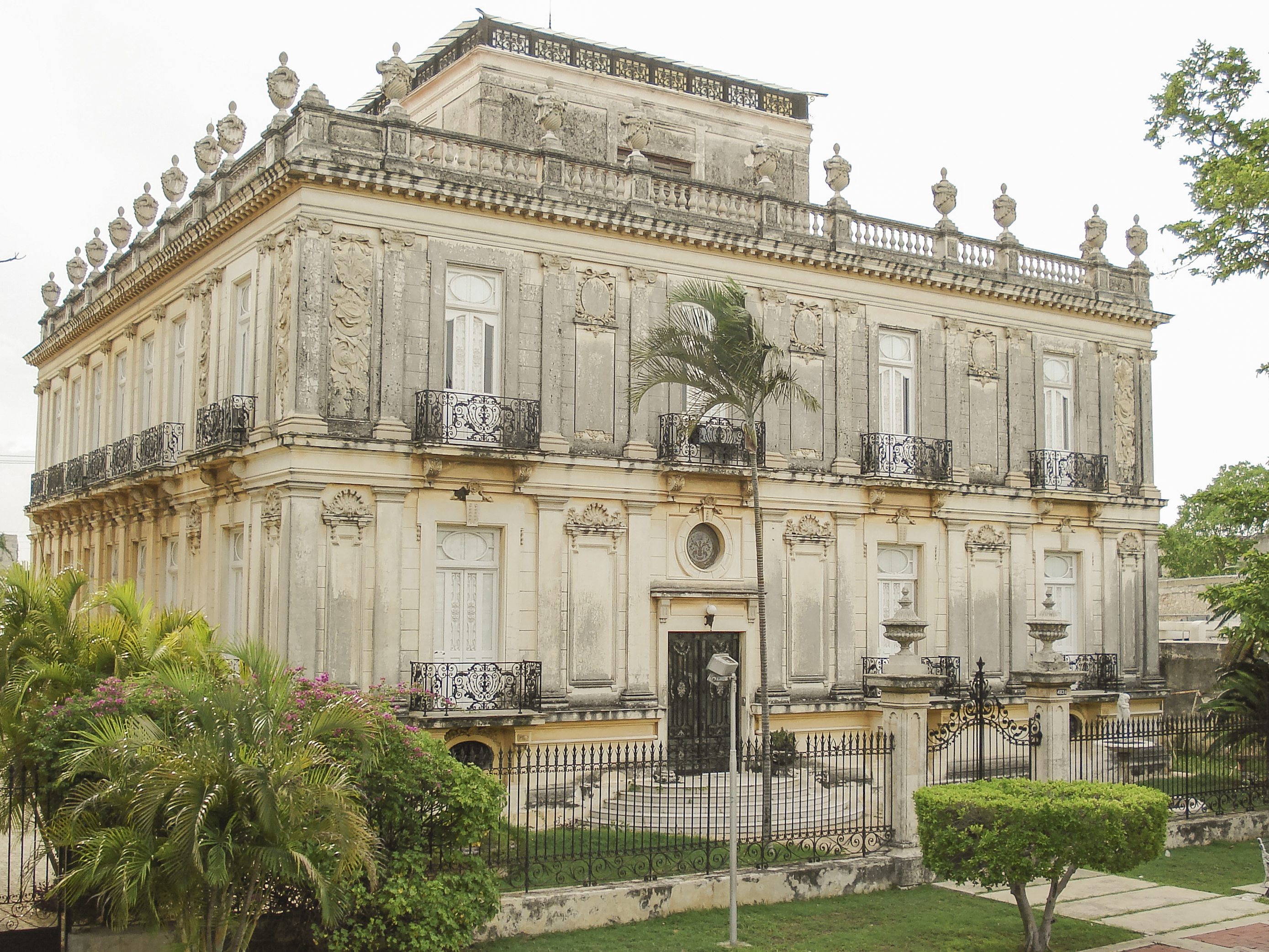
The Cámara Houses in 495 Paseo de Montejo in Mérida, Yucatán.
