= Cámara Houses =

The Cámara Houses
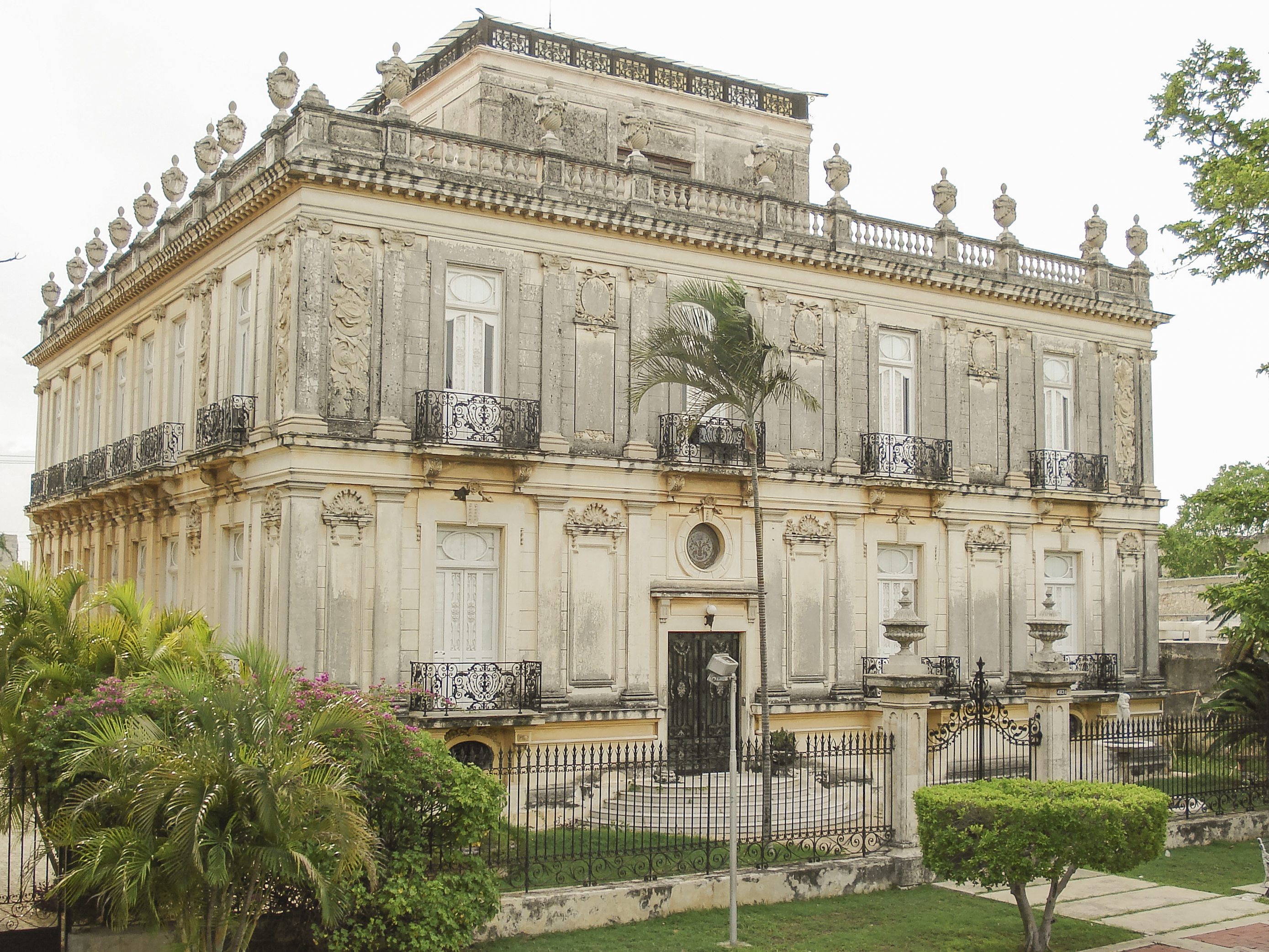
- Interactive map of the The Cámara Houses area

General information
- Location: Paseo de Montejo 495, Mérida, Yucatán, Mexico
- Coordinates: 20°58′36″N 89°37′11″W
- Completed: 1911; 115 years ago

Design and construction
- Architect: Gustave Umbdenstock

The Cámara Houses (In Spanish: Las Casas Cámara, "Las Casas Gemelas"), also known as the Twin Houses (In Spanish: Las Casas Gemelas), are two historic town houses at 495 Paseo de Montejo in Mérida, Yucatán, Mexico. Built between 1908 and 1911, they were based on a Beux-Arts design in the French Second Empire Style by Gustave Umbdenstock, the French architect. Initially, they were a private residence for the aristocratic de la Cámara family. In 1964, one of the two houses was acquired by the Barbachano family; since 2021, it has been open to the public as a museum.

== History ==
Between 1870 and 1920, Yucatán experienced a period of economic prosperity as a result of the rise of the henequen industry. In January 1888, with the support of a group of landowners, industrialists and businessmen, a project arose to build a boulevard modeled after Champs Elysées in Paris, which they called Paseo de Montejo. Soon, many wealthy Yucatecan families began to build European-style mansions along Paseo de Montejo, including Casa Vales (Agustín Vales), Palacio Cantón (Francisco Cantón), Casa Peón de Regil (Peón family), Casa Molina Duarte (Olegario Molina), Casa del Minaret (Peón family), Quinta Montes Molina (Avelino Montes), among others.

In 1905, two brothers, Ernesto and Camilo Cámara, decided to build two houses in the neoclassical style, on a lot with just over 3,000 m^{2} which they owned facing the Paseo de Montejo.

The de la Cámara family gained prominence during the Colonial Period, becoming part of the Mexican nobility and major landowners in the Yucatán Peninsula. During the 19th-century henequen fiber boom, they were part of an oligarchy controlling henequen production, trade, and regional politics, amassing substantial wealth and becoming among the richest families in the Americas.

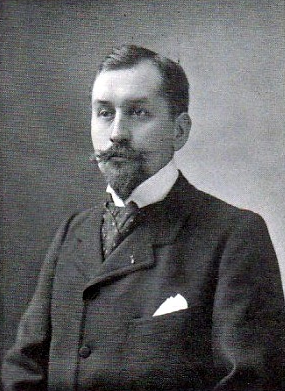
Both houses were designed by Gustave Umbdenstock, a French architect who had studied at the École des Beaux-Arts de Paris.

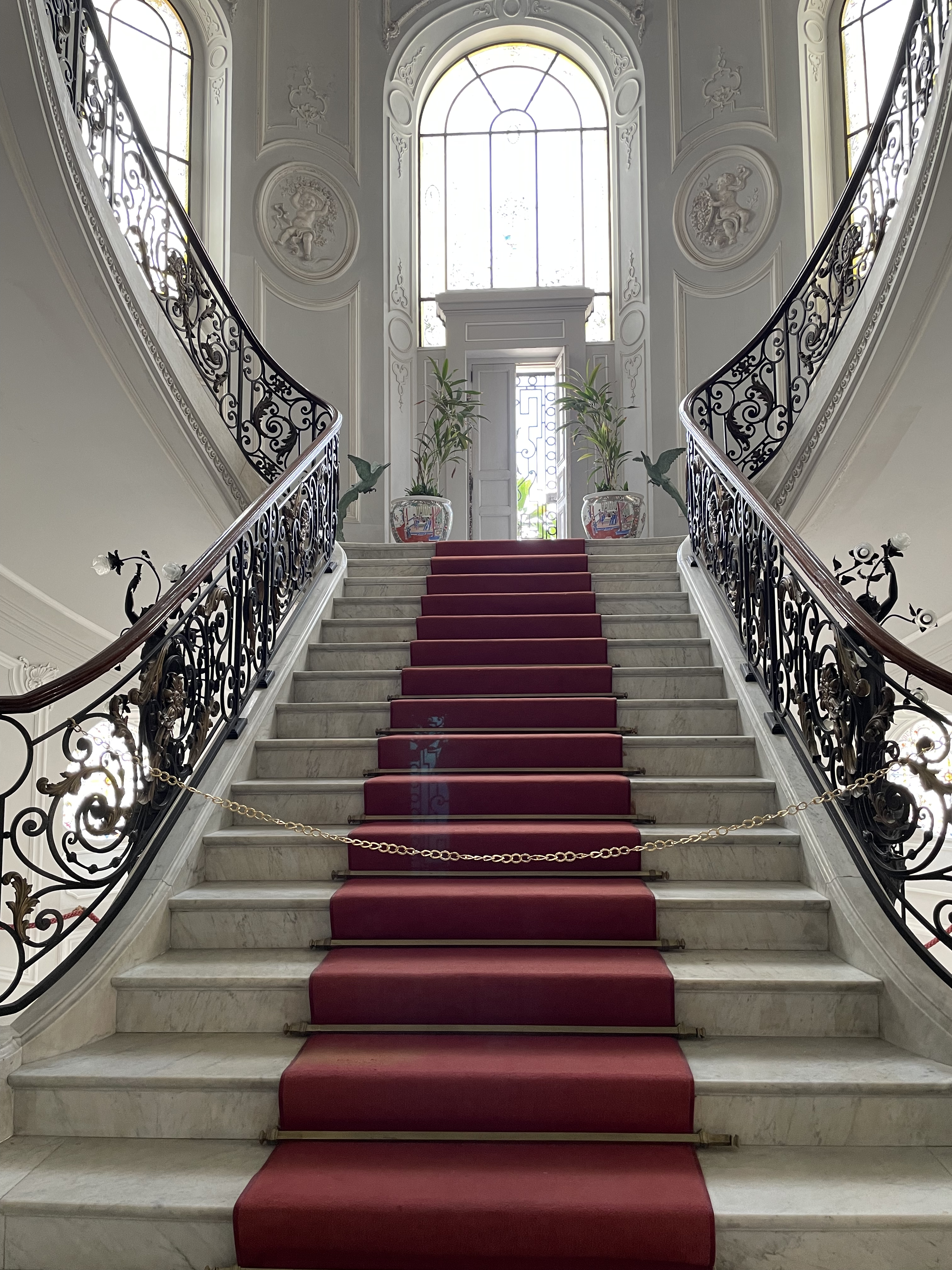
The grand staircase was built in the French Second Empire Style. On the main floor, the staircase is preceded by a portal of paired columns, the shafts carved in a single piece of Bianco Carrara marble imported from Italy, which complement the steps.

Since 1905, the Cámara brothers had contacted Gustave Umbdenstock and agreed that he would design a couple of residences to be built in Mérida and for which the necessary materials would be imported from Europe. Umbdenstock was a French architect that had studied at l'Ecole des Beaux-Arts de Paris and who had been the chief architect for the construction of the "Palais de France" at the Louisiana Purchase Exposition in St. Louis in 1904. Umbdenstock would be in charge of the floor plans, the façades and the interior design of both houses.

By 1907, the floor plans were ready and Umbdenstock had them published in the April and May issues of the French magazine "La Construction Moderne" under the title "Hôtels particuliers à Mérida (Mexique)". The "four-story houses were structured around a triple central height (covered by a skylight) around which the various rooms and a large grand staircase were grouped, and which they served (thanks to two additional staircases) the servant quarters in the semi-basement. The façades are of a clear Beaux-Arts design in the Second Empire style and could have been designed to fit comfortably in the Boulevard Saint Germain or the Champs Elysées in Paris [...] Around the large central space, the Grand Hall, the various lounges, library, dining room and games room (billiard room) are distributed on the main floor." Additionally, each house has 10 bedrooms and 8 bathrooms.

Construction began in 1908 under the supervision of Manuel G. Cantón, a civil engineer, who would build the houses according to the exact specifications provided by Umbdenstock in Paris. Manuel Cantón had previously built the Cantón Palace (Palacio Cantón), as a private residence for his uncle, General Francisco Cantón, the former governor of Yucatán (1898 -1902); the Cantón Palace has housed the Regional Museum of Anthropology (Museo Regional de Antropología) since it was founded by Fernando Cámara Barbachano in 1966.

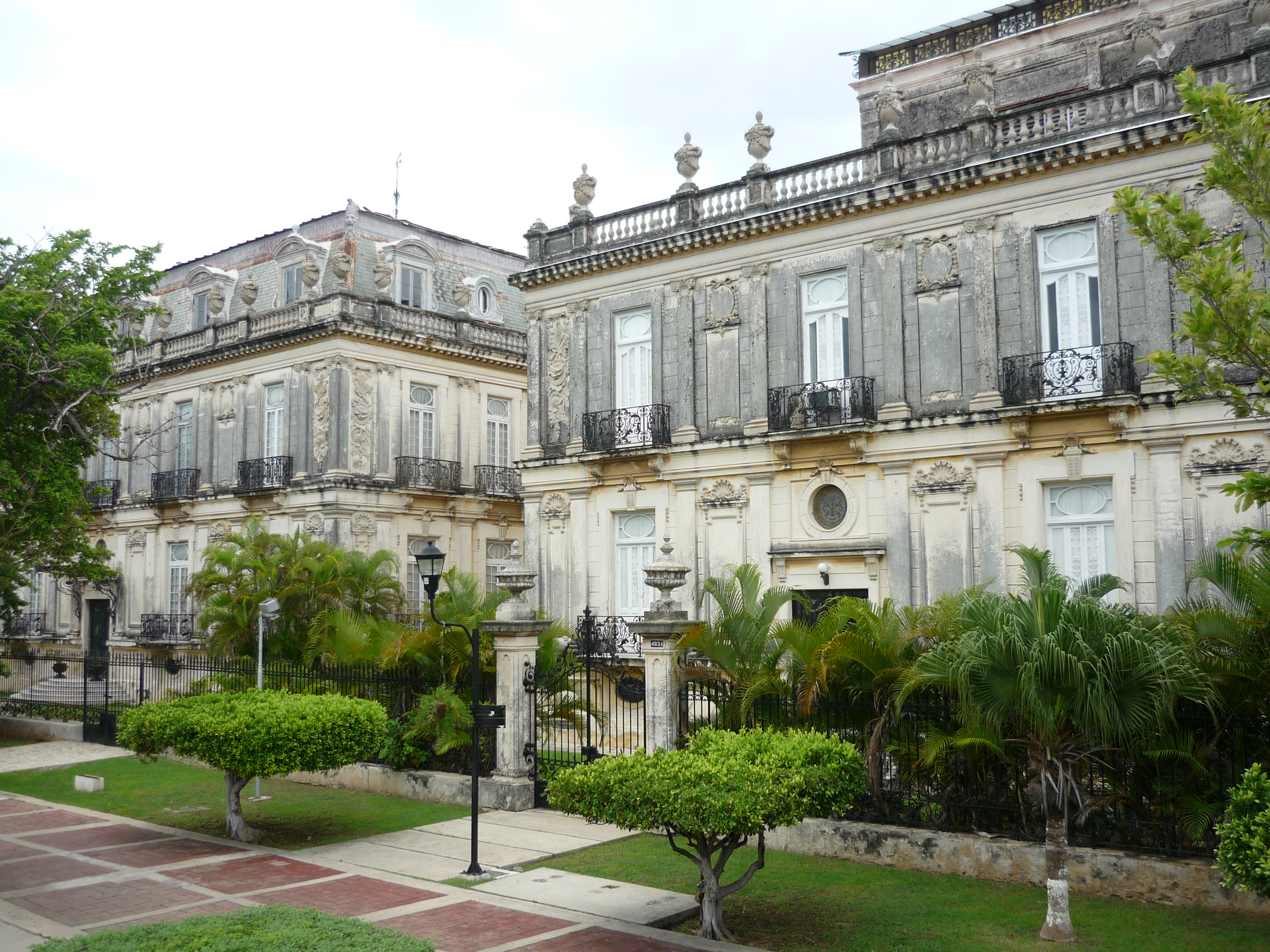
The Cámara Houses viewed from Paseo de Montejo

When the Mexican Revolution started, in November 1910, the houses were still incomplete; nevertheless, despite the political instability, work continued. The southernmost house was finished in September 1911. Many of the materials were imported directly from Europe, including finishing touches for the ceilings, carrara marble for the floors and paired columns, the iron balustrades for the staircase and balconies and the cabinetry. The house also had modern installation work: hidden plumbing, electricity and telephone service.

Both houses were private residences for the Cámara family and soon came to be known as las Casas Cámara, after its owners. They are also known as the Twin Houses (Casas gemelas) even though the two houses are similar but not quite identical. In 1964, one of the houses was sold to Fernando Barbachano Gomez Rul, the business magnate who was responsible for developing the tourism industry in the Yucatán Peninsula.

For over 100 years, the Cámara Houses have served as the private residence for the Cámara and Barbachano families until one of the two houses was opened to the public as a museum in 2021 by owner Maruja Barbachano Herrero. The other house remains in private ownership having recently been acquired by Mario Molina, a wealthy heir of the Molina family.

== Gallery ==
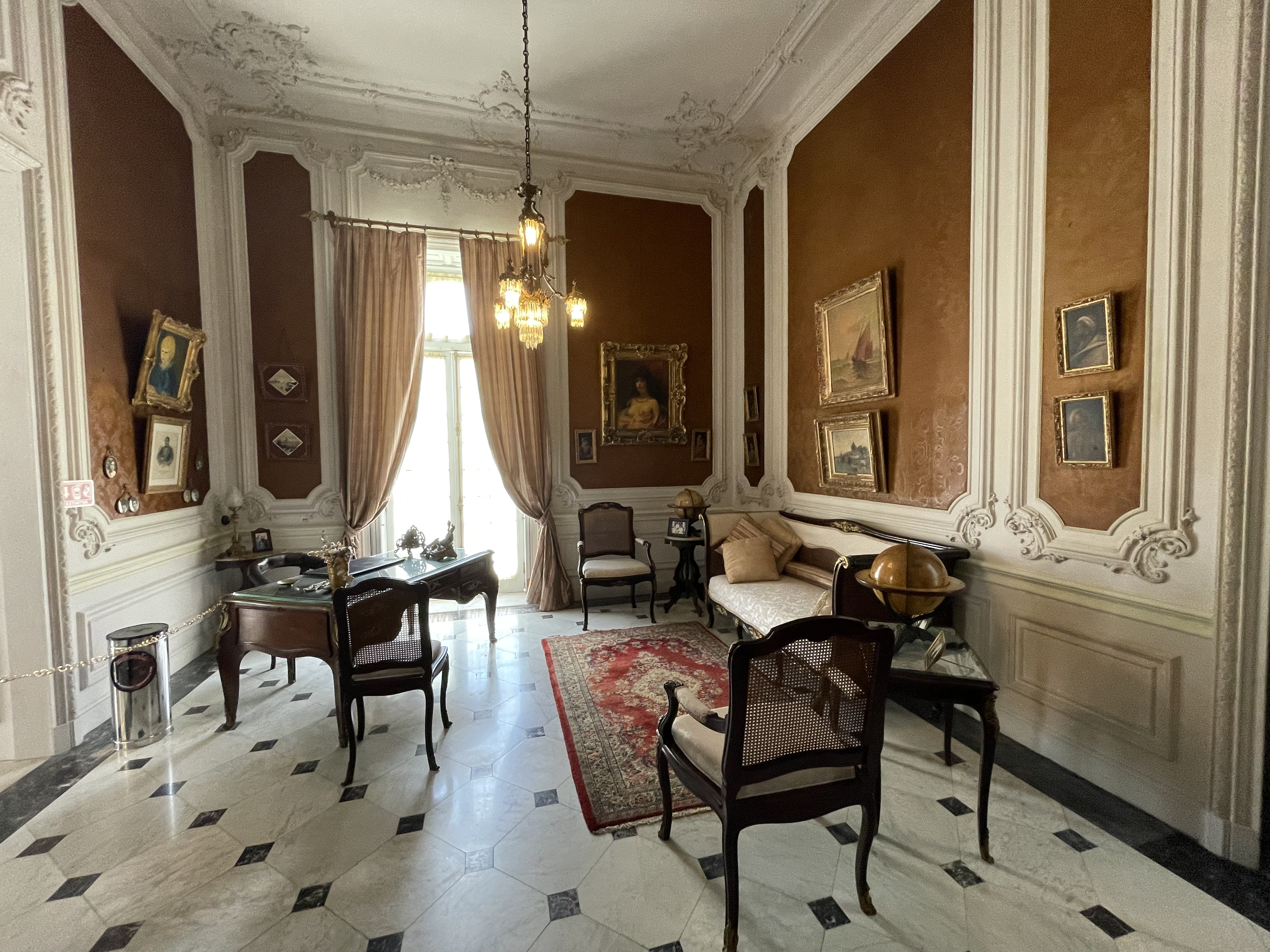

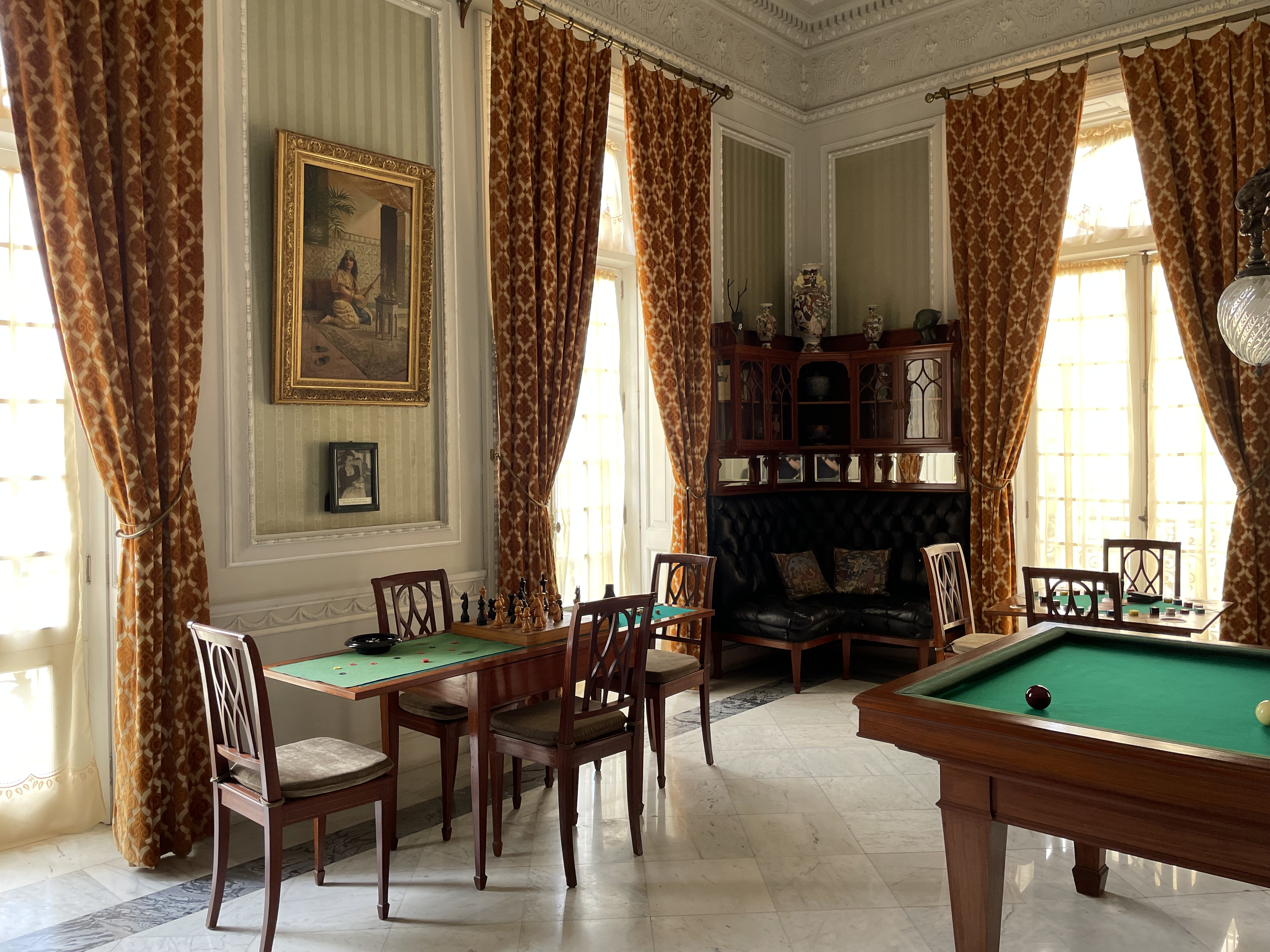

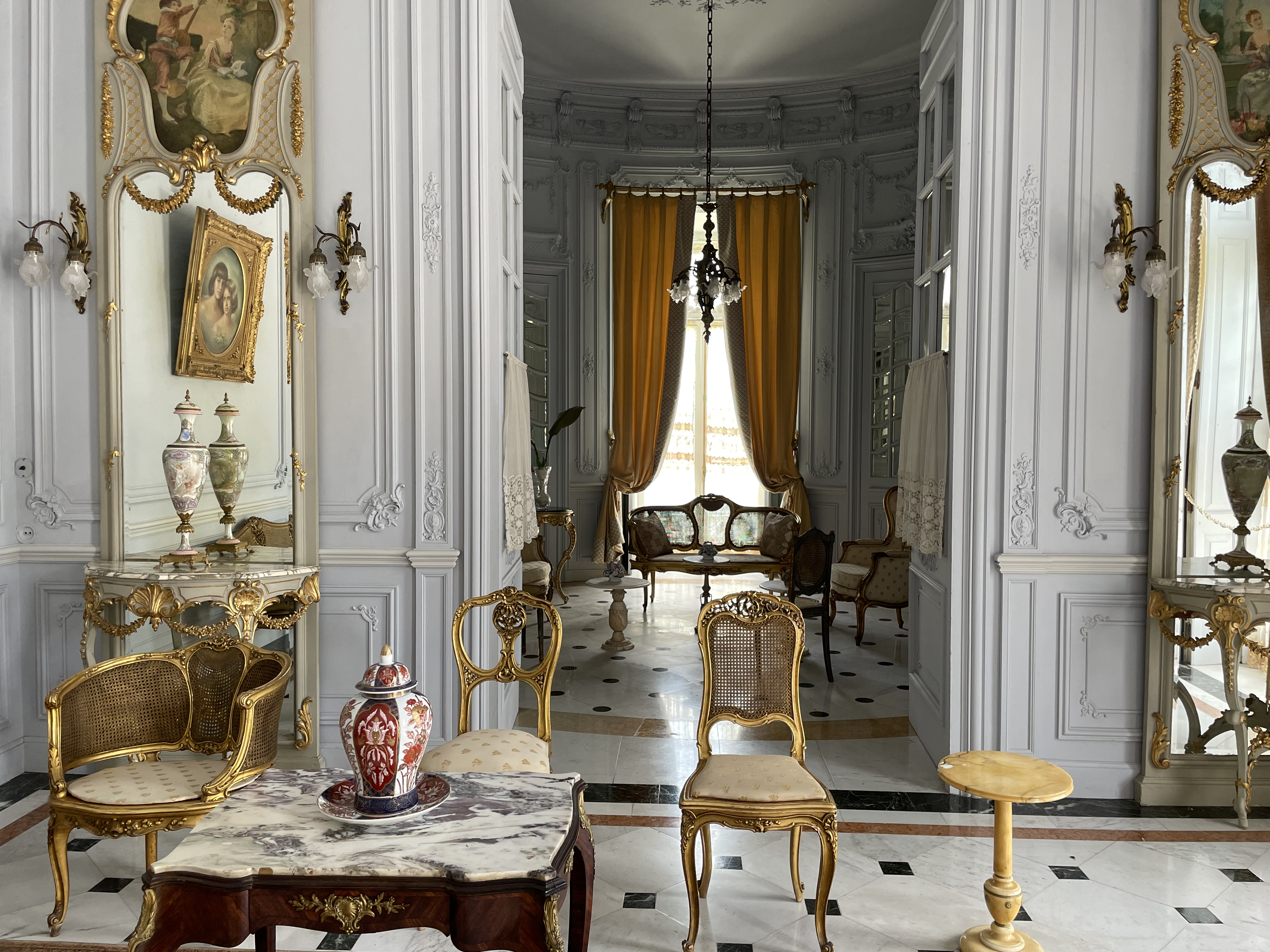

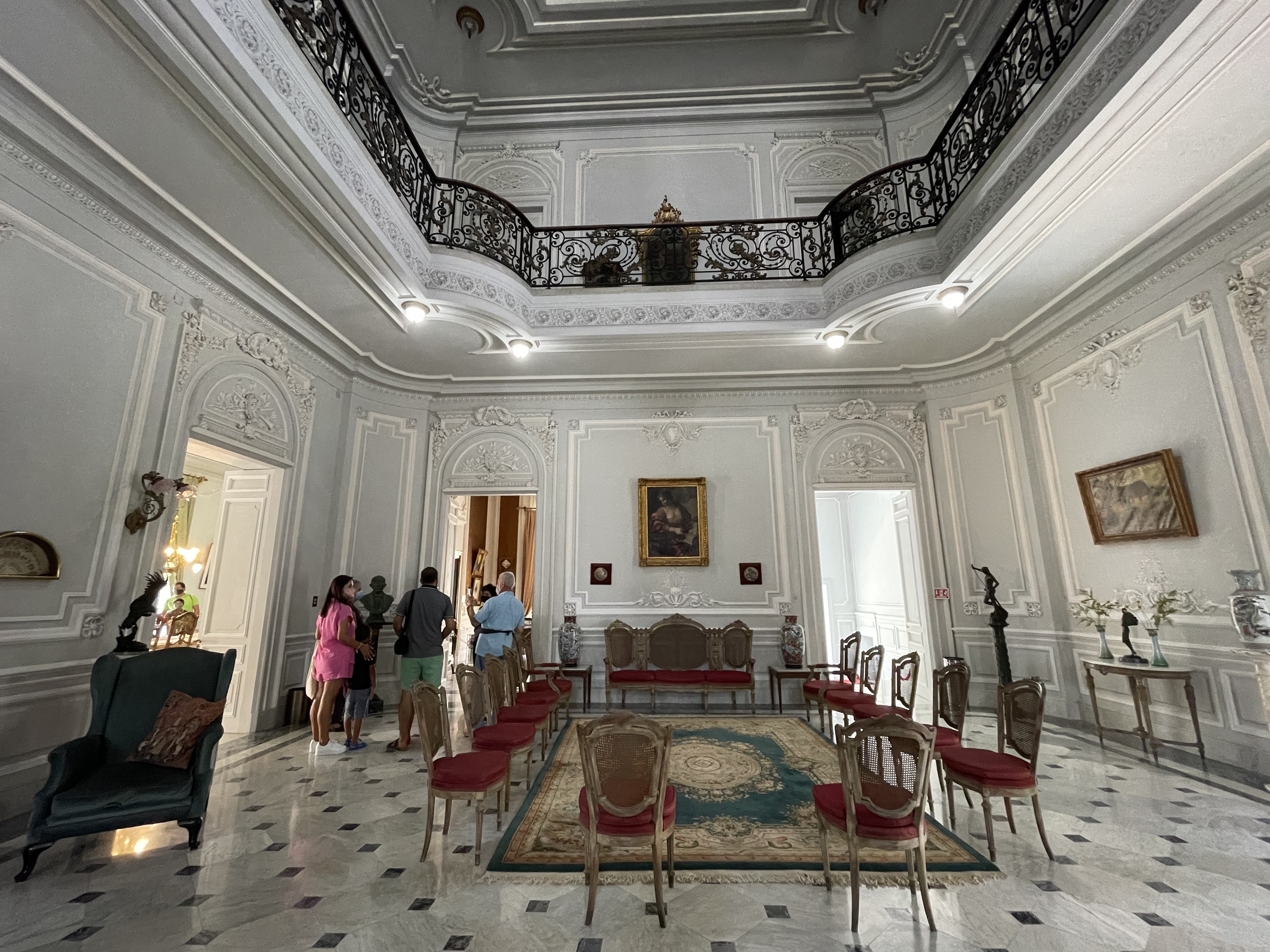

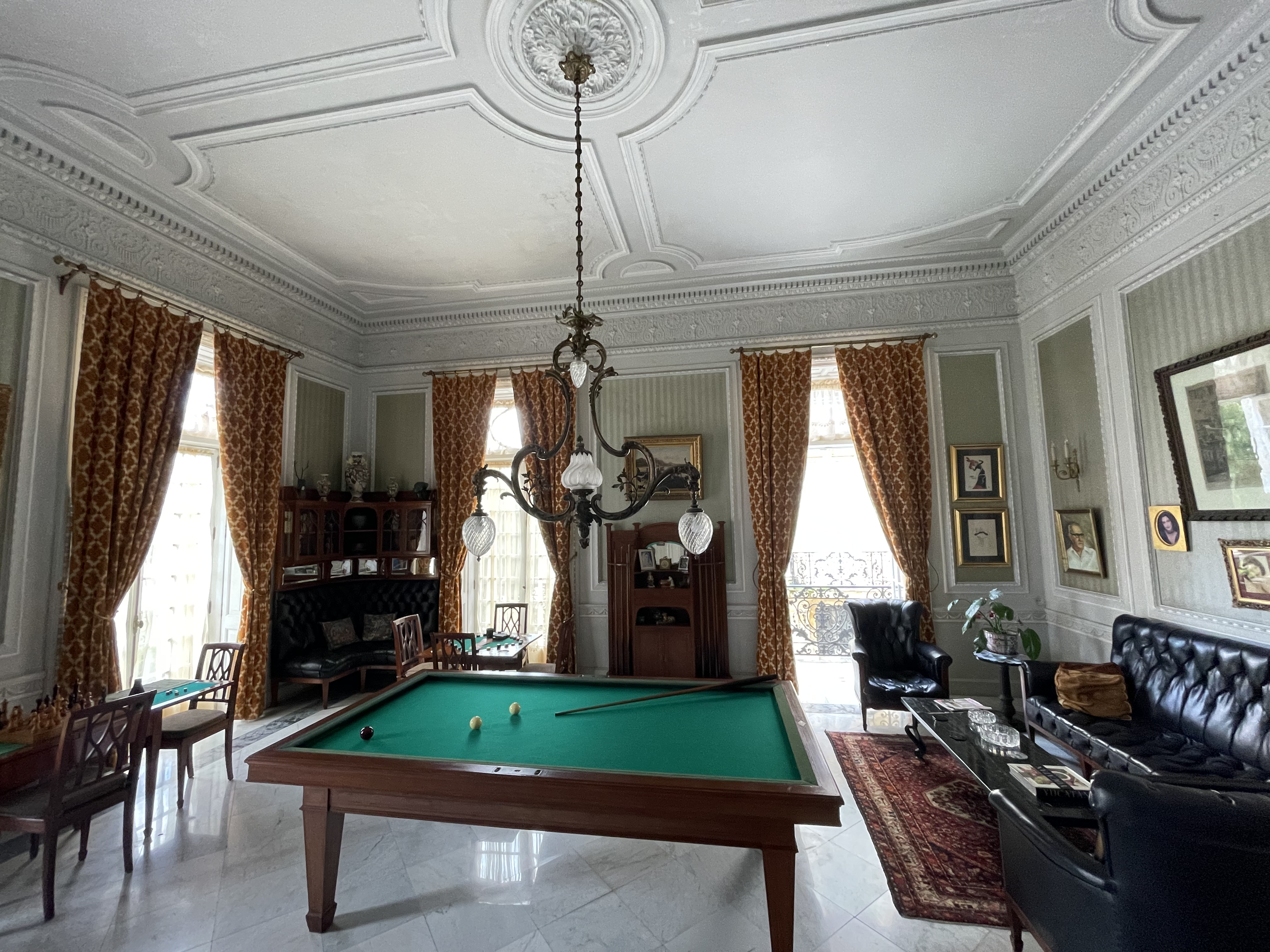

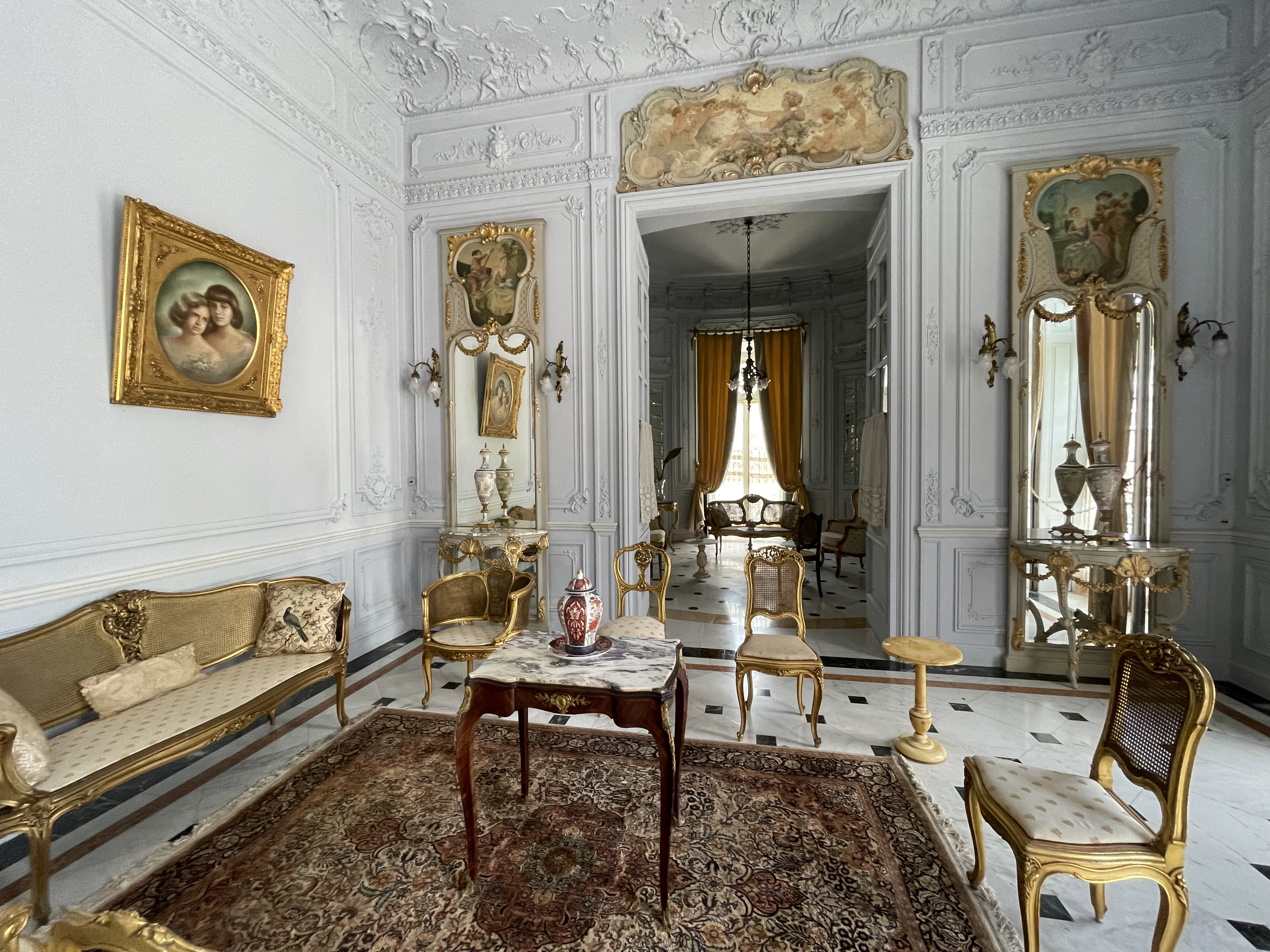

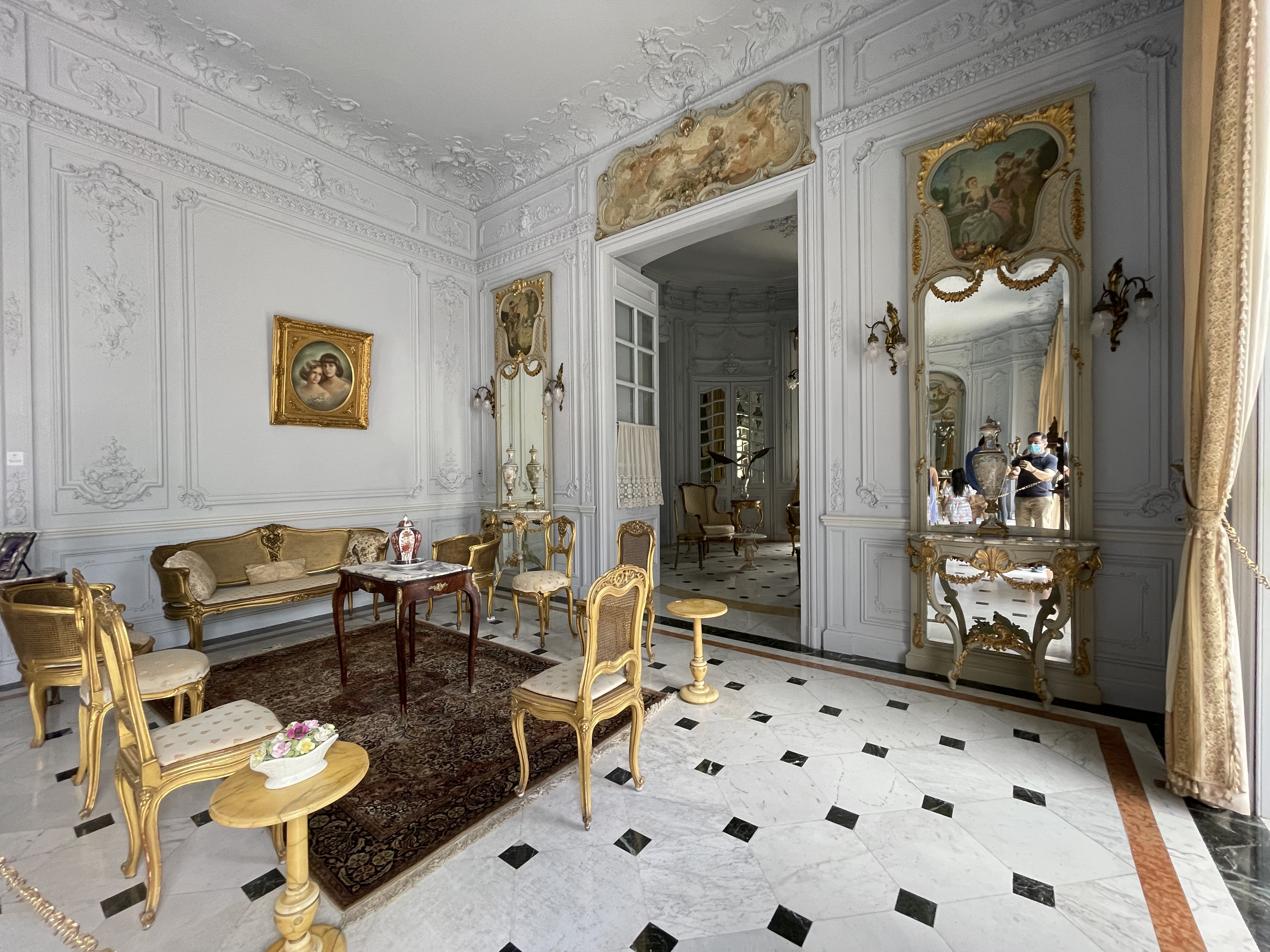

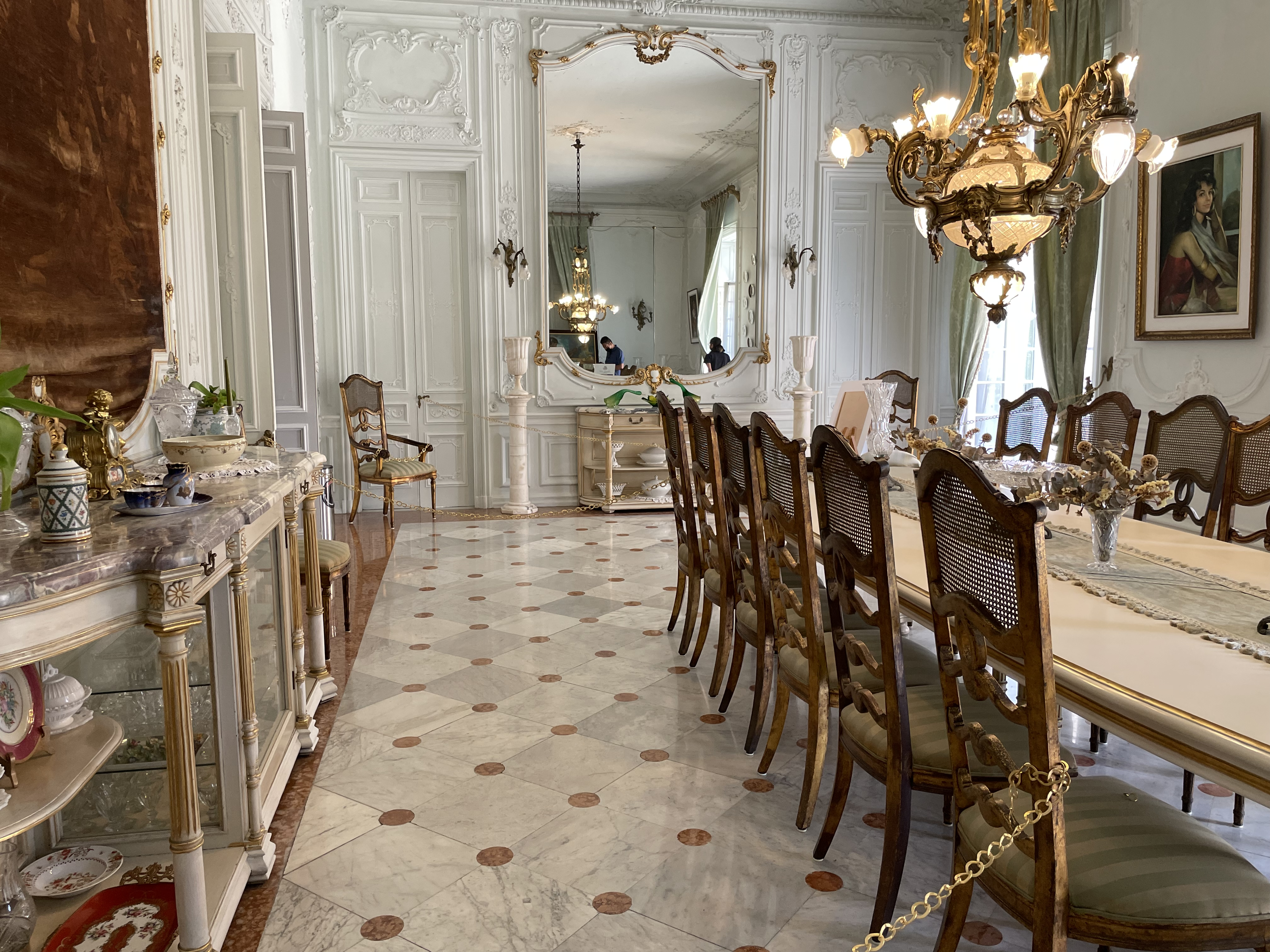

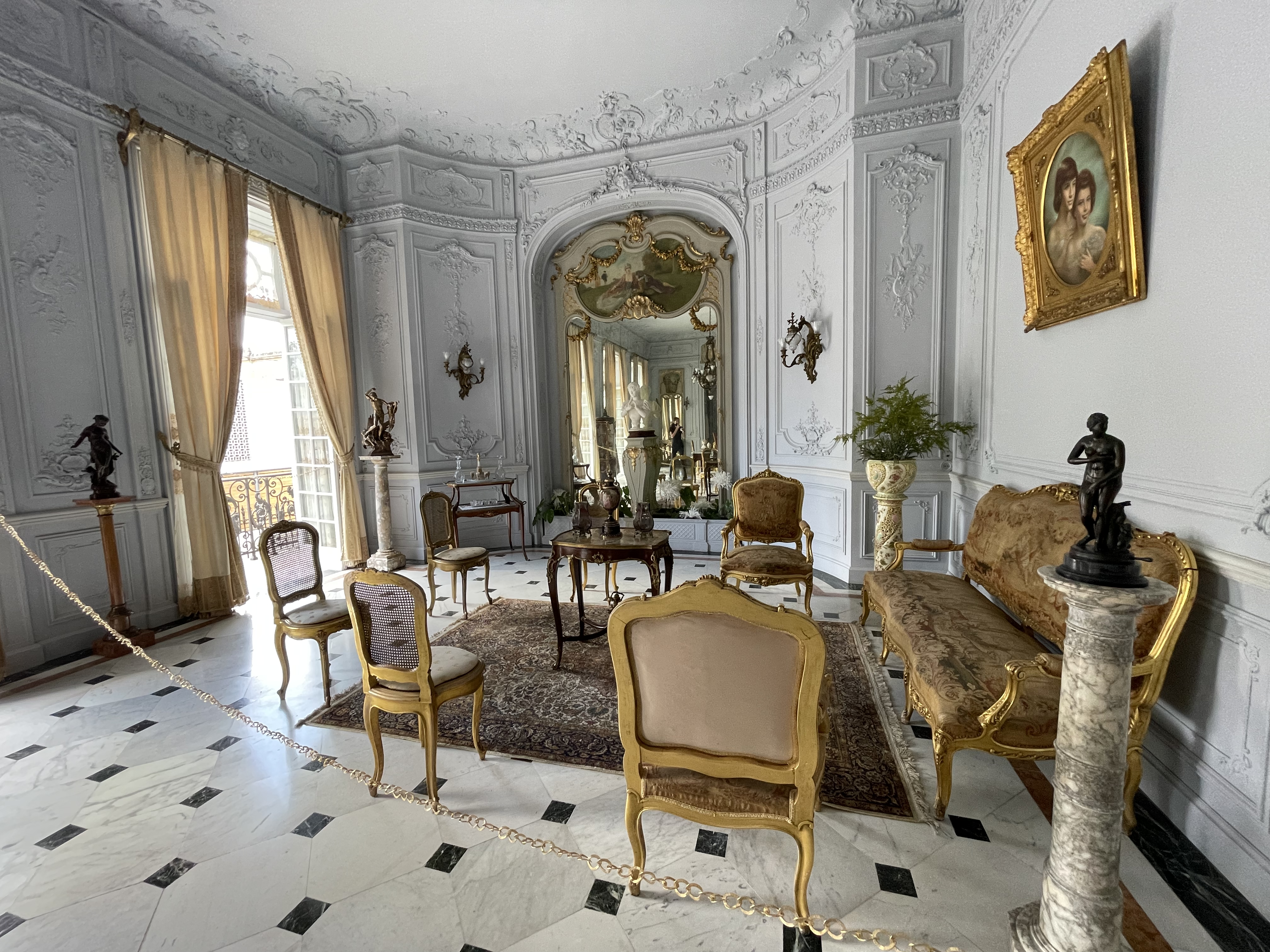

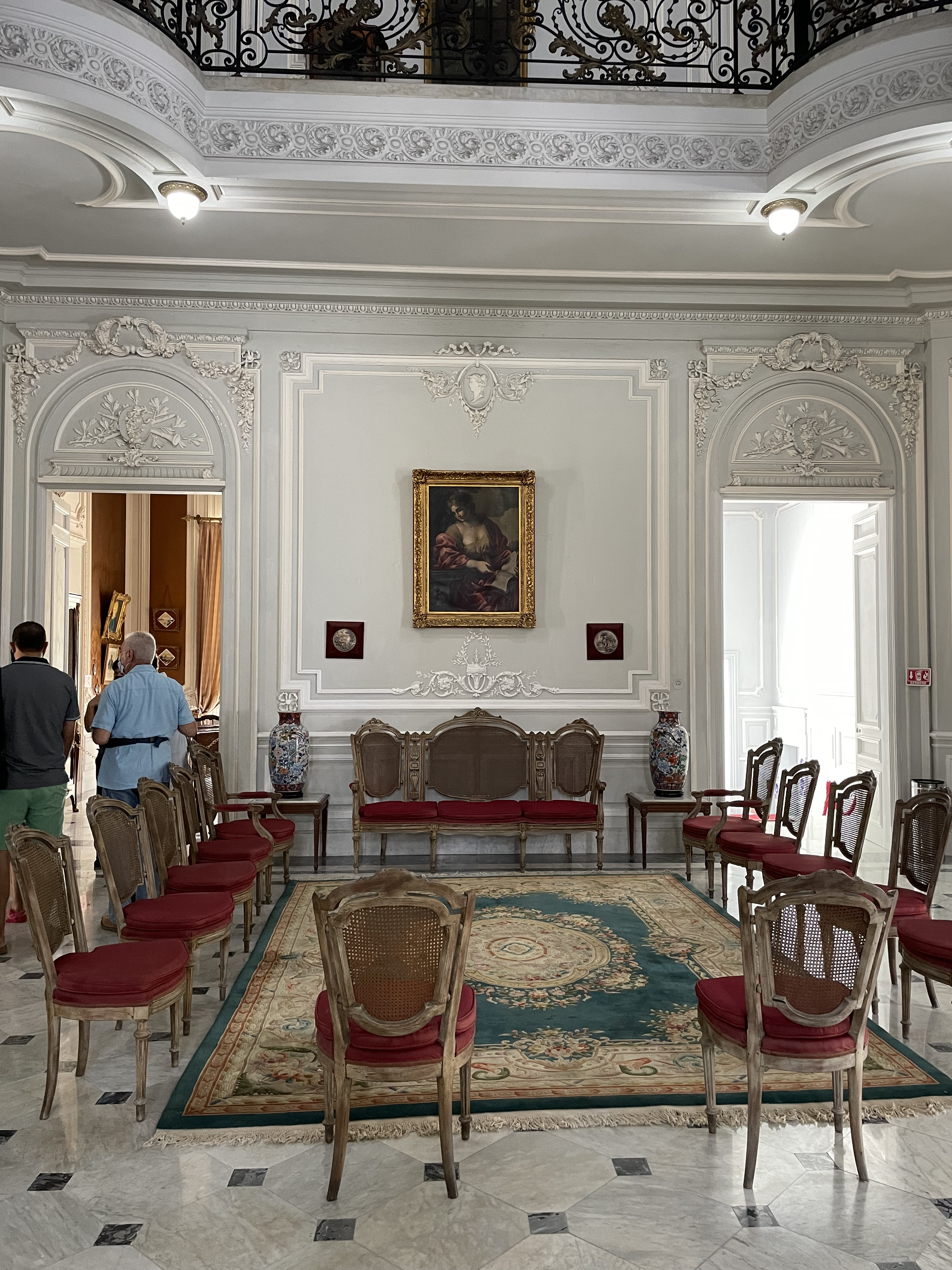
