= Juan de la Cámara =

Spanish conquistador and hidalgo (1525–1602)

Juan Juárez de la Cámara (1525–1602) was a Spanish conquistador, nobleman, and colonial administrator known for his role in the Spanish Conquest of Yucatán. Born into the noble de la Cámara family, he arrived in the New World in 1539 and played a key role in founding Mérida, the second Spanish city in the Yucatan peninsula. He held influential positions in the city council, serving as chief constable and later as mayor of Mérida. Juan also explored and settled parts of Yucatán, Guatemala and Belize, receiving encomiendas from the Spanish Crown.

His observations on the Maya Civilization, documented in letters to Charles V, continue to be cited by scholars. The establishment of a cadet branch within the de la Cámara family marked the beginning of a lineage with notable descendants who played significant roles in the Viceroyalty of New Spain and continued to be influential in Yucatecan society even after Mexican Independence. Juan de la Cámara's descendants became part of the old Mexican nobility, holding positions in various fields and owning notable properties, including long-time ownership of Cancún.

== Life ==
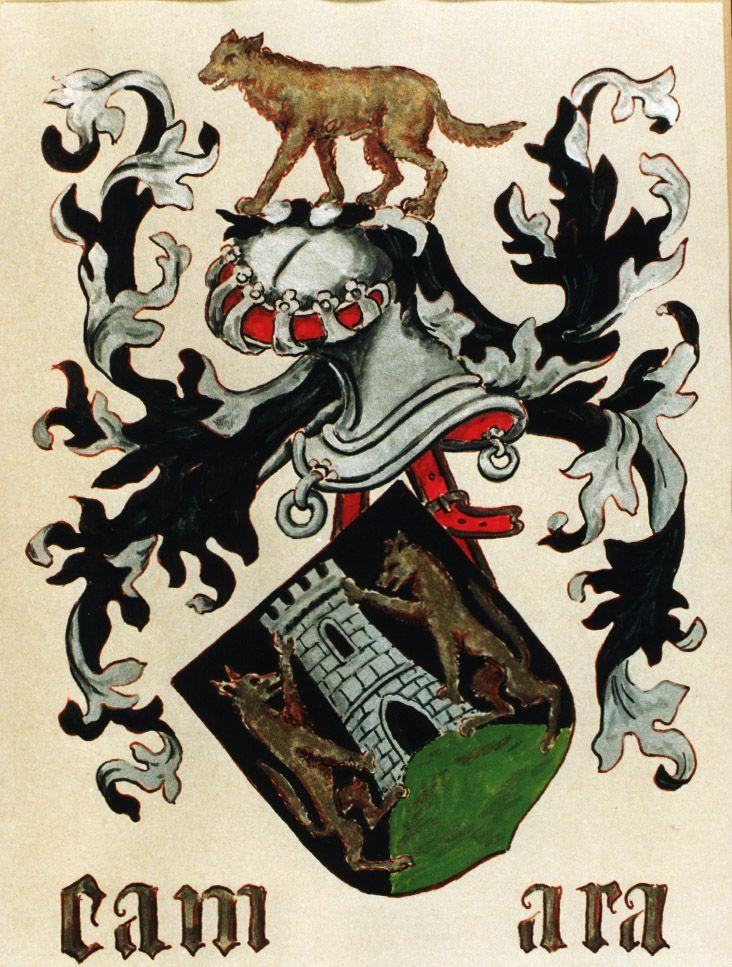
The Coat of Arms of the de la Cámara family were granted by Ferdinand III in 1227. This copy is found in the Livro do Armeiro-Mor, a Portuguese armorial dating from 1520 which included the heraldry of the most important European royal and noble families.

Born in Alcalá de Henares in 1525 to a noble lineage, Juan de la Cámara could trace his family tree to the thirteenth century, with ancestors who fought for the Castilian Crown during the Iberian Reconquista. In 1227, under Ferdinand III, the de la Cámara family was ennobled and granted a coat of arms. He held the best and oldest documents of ancestral nobility among the Spanish conquistadores.

Under the system of male primogeniture, all the estates of the Cámara family passed on to the eldest son. As the younger son of a noble family, Juan de la Cámara sought to make his own fortune in the Americas which were being explored and settled by the Spanish and Portuguese in the early sixteenth century. He arrived in the New World in 1539, aged fourteen.

In early 1541, he joined Francisco de Montejo the Younger in Campeche, then the only Spanish city in the Yucatán Peninsula. Montejo, who headed an army of approximately 400 Spanish soldiers, appointed Juan de la Cámara as one of his chief military commanders, despite his youth. Shortly after establishing the Spanish presence in Campeche, Montejo the Younger summoned the local Maya lords and commanded them to submit to the Spanish Crown. Several lords decided to submit peacefully. Thus, the western region of Yucatán was conquered without significant resistance, facilitating the establishment of Spanish authority and paving the way for subsequent colonial developments in the area.

On 6 January 1542, the conquistadors founded the city of Mérida, only the second Spanish city in the Yucatan Peninsula, after Campeche. Mérida took its name as the Maya ruins discovered by the conquistadors in the Ti'ho settlement resembled the Roman ruins of Augusta Emerita in Mérida, Spain. The city earned the moniker "The White City" (La Ciudad Blanca"), possibly due to the use of white limestone on the facades of its colonial buildings. Another theory suggests that the nickname arose because from colonial times through the mid-19th century, Mérida was a walled city designed to protect the predominantly European population (peninsulares and criollos) from periodic uprisings by the indigenous Maya people, ultimately culminating with the caste war of Yucatán (1847 - 1901).

While Montejo served as mayor of Mérida (alcalde mayor), Juan de la Cámara was invited to participate in the first city council (cabildo) as chief constable (alguacil mayor), although he was only seventeen years old at the time. In this role, he was responsible for enforcing justice and pursuing criminals. Like other members of the cabildo, he took legal possession of properties on behalf of the City. He also had the authority to execute arrest warrants issued by the viceroy, the high court (real audiencia), the governor (corregidor), or the alcalde mayor.

In 1565, he was elected to serve as alcalde mayor or mayor of Mérida. During the colonial period, several of his descendants also held the position of mayor in Mérida: Juan de la Cámara y Sandoval (1609, 1613), Juan Antonio de la Cámara y Solís (1753), Gregorio de la Cámara (1769, 1780, 1788), José de la Cámara y del Castillo (1782, 1792), and Cristobal de la Cámara (1786).

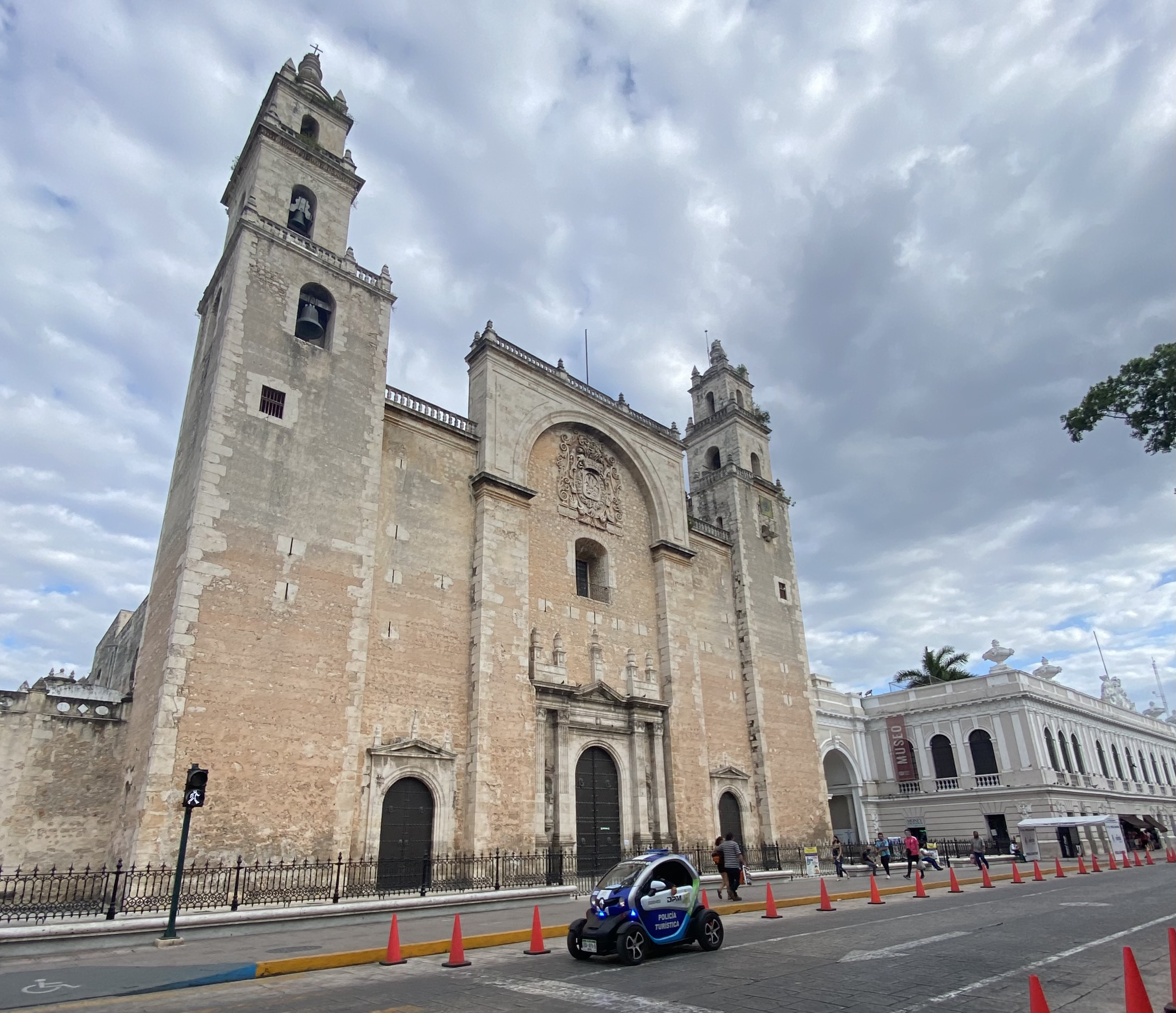
In 1542, Juan de la Cámara co-founded Mérida, the second Spanish city in the Yucatán peninsula. The Cathedral, shown here, was built by the Spanish between 1561 and 1598.

Juan de la Cámara also participated in the exploration of the region between El Cuyo in Yucatán and Lake Izabal in Guatemala. The Spanish crown awarded Juan de la Cámara encomiendas, including the towns of Cahabon, Ixtutz, Euán (Tixkokob), and Sinanché.

His observations on the Maya Civilization, contained in his letters to Charles V, known as relación de Sinanché y Egum, continue to be cited by scholars.

In 1563, Juan de la Cámara married Doña Francisca de Sandoval y Méndez, the daughter of Gónzalo Méndez de Soto, another conquistador, and Ana de Sandoval Acosta. Her sister, Catalina de Sandoval y Méndez was married to Guillén de las Casas, governor of Yucatán (1577 - 1582).

Their eldest son, Juan de la Cámara y Sandoval followed in his father's footsteps, serving two terms as mayor of Mérida in 1609 and 1613.

Their descendants became a prominent family in the old Mexican nobility, maintaining its identity and continuity for over eighteen generations, avoiding the loss of their family name or social status. Members of the family frequently intermarried with other aristocratic families of European descent. Through the centuries, their descendants have included distinguished statesmen, soldiers, church figures, landowners, industrialists, and philanthropists (see House of Cámara). As noted by García Bernal:

"The genealogical study of various landowning families reveals the extent to which they constituted a distinct social caste within Yucatecan society. It sheds light on their consciousness of belonging to a privileged group. Over the centuries, these families formed a separate and exclusive oligarchy. Analysis of documents pertaining to encomienda concessions initially hinted at the existence of a criollo aristocracy. However, further investigations revealed the presence of a small, tightly-knit oligarchy. Through the practice of endogamy, they preserved and even enhanced their distinguished lineage by forging new connections with the descendants of other conquistadors. A noteworthy observation is the intricate interconnections among these families, with most being directly or indirectly related. It is fascinating to note that a significant majority of these families can trace their ancestry back to the most eminent conquistadores. While it may seem logical that all criollo inhabitants of Yucatan descended from the first conquistadores, the anomaly arises when considering the limited number of men, such as Francisco de Montejo, Gaspar and Melchor Pacheco, Juan de Magaña, Juan de la Cámara, [etc.,] who emerge as common ancestors for many Yucatecan families. This pattern underscores a closed society that fervently defends its conquistador origins, solidifying this heritage through intermarriage with families boasting similar ancestry."

The descendants of Juan de la Cámara were long-time owners of Cancún, a significant tourist destination in the Caribbean.

== See also ==
- List of conquistadors
