= Sinanché Municipality =

Municipality in the Mexican state of Yucatán

Sinanché
- Municipality
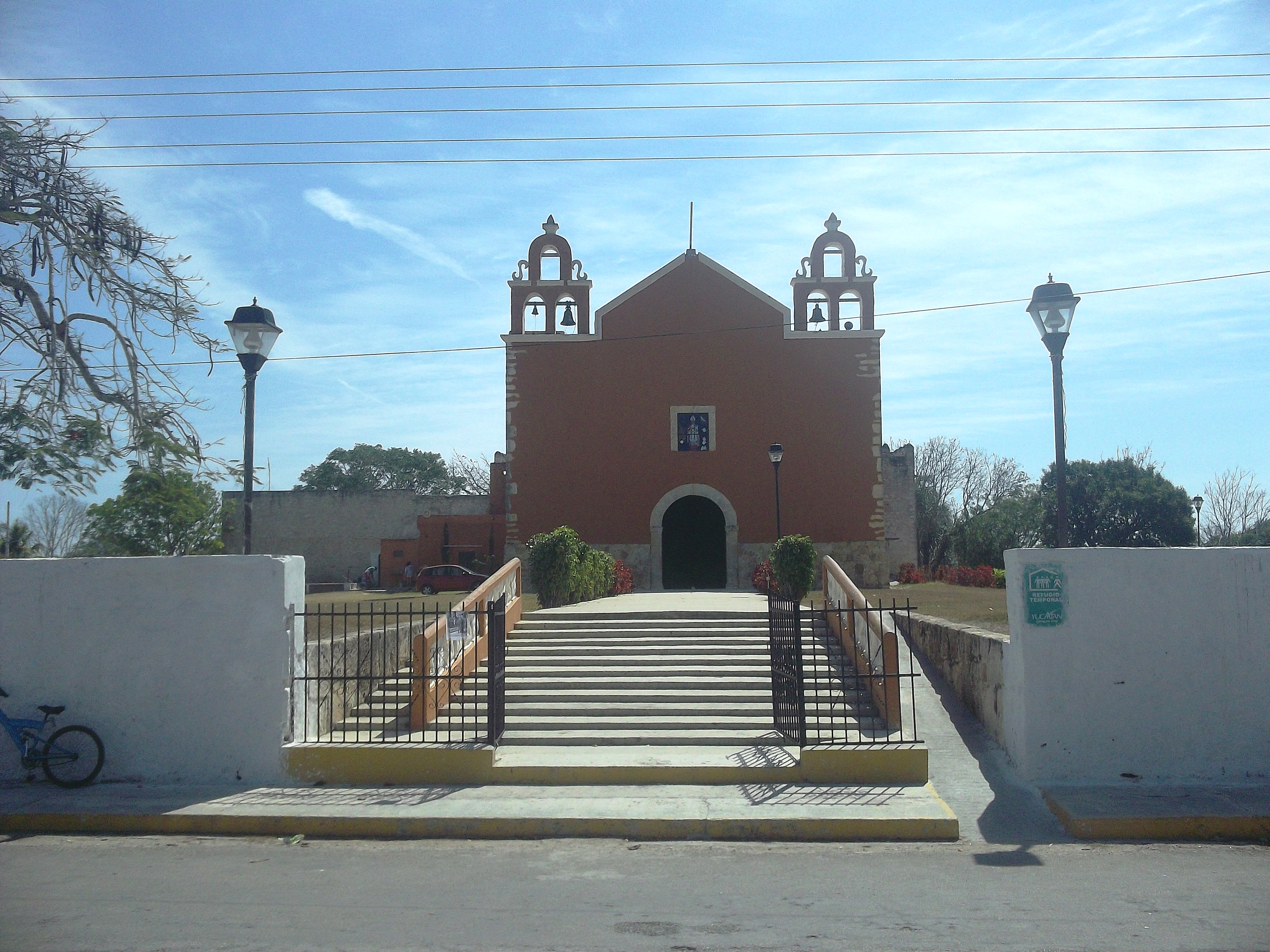
- Principal Church of Sinanché, Yucatán

- Municipal location in Yucatán

- Location of the Municipality in Mexico
- Coordinates: 21°13′30″N 89°11′06″W
- Country: Mexico
- State: Yucatán

Government
  - Type: 2012–2015
  - Municipal President: Felipe De Jesus Rojas Escalante

Area
  - Total: 131.57 km^{2} (50.80 sq mi)
- Elevation: 6 m (20 ft)

Population (2010)
  - Total: 3,126
- Time zone: UTC-6 (Central Standard Time)
- INEGI Code: 068
- Major Airport: Merida (Manuel Crescencio Rejón) International Airport
- IATA Code: MID
- ICAO Code: MMMD

Sinanché Municipality (In the Yucatec Maya Language: “scorpion tree”) is a municipality in the Mexican state of Yucatán containing 131.57 square kilometres (50.80 sq mi) of land and located roughly 60 kilometres (37 mi) northeast of the city of Mérida.

== History ==
During pre-Hispanic times, the town fell within the provinces under the chieftainship of Ceh Pech. After the conquest the area became part of the encomienda system. The first encomendero was Ambrosio de Villafrades (1549) who was followed by Juan de la Cámara (1579). He passed the estate to Juan Xuárez de la Cámara in 1607 and by 1625 it was in the possession of Diego and Francisca del Rey. By 1668 the encomendero was José Yngrán de Malaparte, but he died without heirs. In 1692, it was assigned to Francisco A. de Ancona Hinostrosa.

Yucatán declared its independence from the Spanish Crown in 1821 and in 1825, the area was assigned to the coastal region with its headquarters in Izamal Municipality. In 1918 it was designated as its own municipality.

== Governance ==
The municipal president is elected for a three-year term. The town council has four councilpersons, who serve as Secretary and councilors of policing, public sanitation, nomenclature and roads and cemeteries.

The Municipal Council administers the business of the municipality. It is responsible for budgeting and expenditures and producing all required reports for all branches of the municipal administration. Annually it determines educational standards for schools.

The Police Commissioners ensure public order and safety. They are tasked with enforcing regulations, distributing materials and administering rulings of general compliance issued by the council.

== Communities ==
The head of the municipality is Sinanché, Yucatán. The larger populated areas of the municipality include Chun copo, San Crisanto, San Luis, Santa Catalina, Santa Cruz, Santa Ursula, Hacienda Zayate, and Zibagón. The significant populations are shown below:

Community	Population
Entire Municipality (2010)	3,126
San Crisanto	531 in 2005
Sinanché	2429 in 2005

== Eco tourism ==
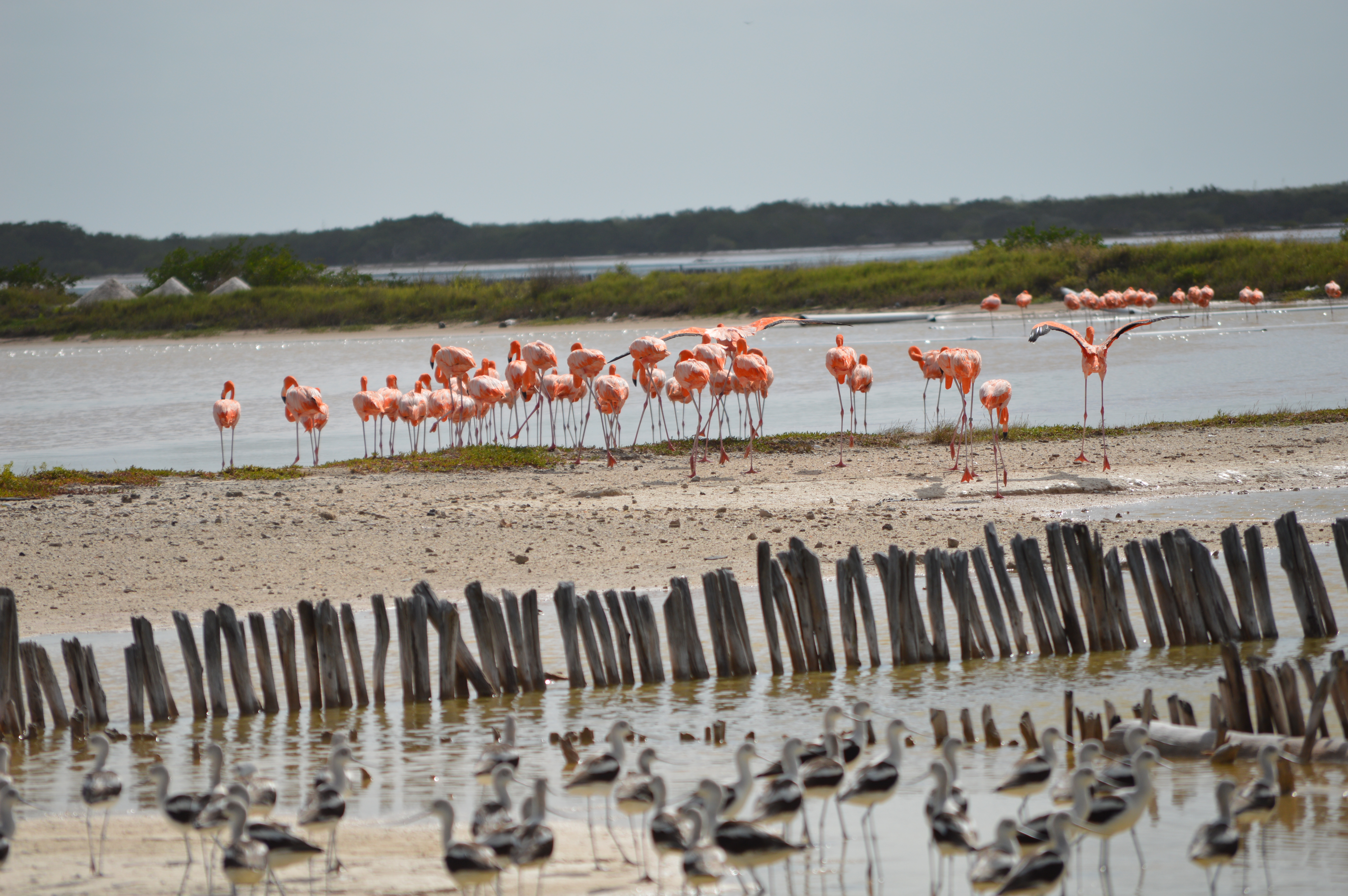

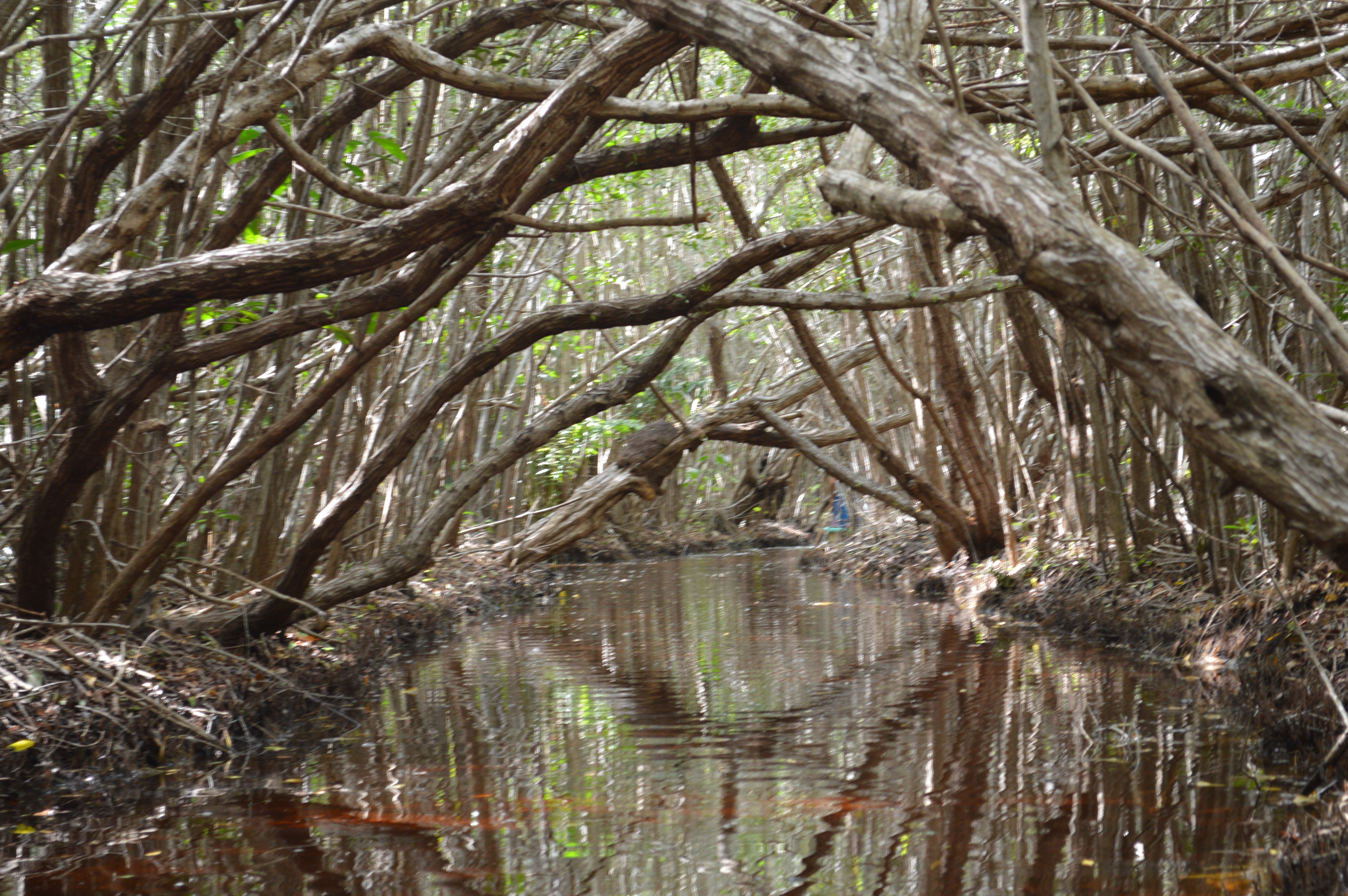
Waders and mangrove at the San Crisanto Ejido

In the San Crisanto communal village of Sinanché Municipality the San Crisanto initiative has been launched. The objective of this initiative is to promote eco-tourism integrated with other economic activities and education, in an area “rich in biodiversity” but is subject to vagaries of weather, particularly disastrous hurricanes. The activities involved with this initiative to attract tourists are: undertaking boat trips, swimming in very clear waters of “cenotes” or sink holes, living in environmentally favourable "eco-cabins", buying locally made crafts and coconut based toffees. Other activities pursued are environmental education, mangrove conservation, adopting the "}ejido system" of "communal tenure and farming of public lands". The communal resources such as “agriculture, craft production and salt extraction" are also part of this programme. All these activities are covered under the San Crisanto Foundation launched in 2001. The project is reported to have proved economically beneficial to the community.

== Local festivals ==
Every year on 14 July is the celebration for the town's patron, San Buenaventura.

== Tourist attractions ==
- Church of San Buenaventura, built in the seventeenth century
- Hacienda Santa Cruz
