= Paseo de Montejo =

Avenue of Mérida, Yucatán, Mexico

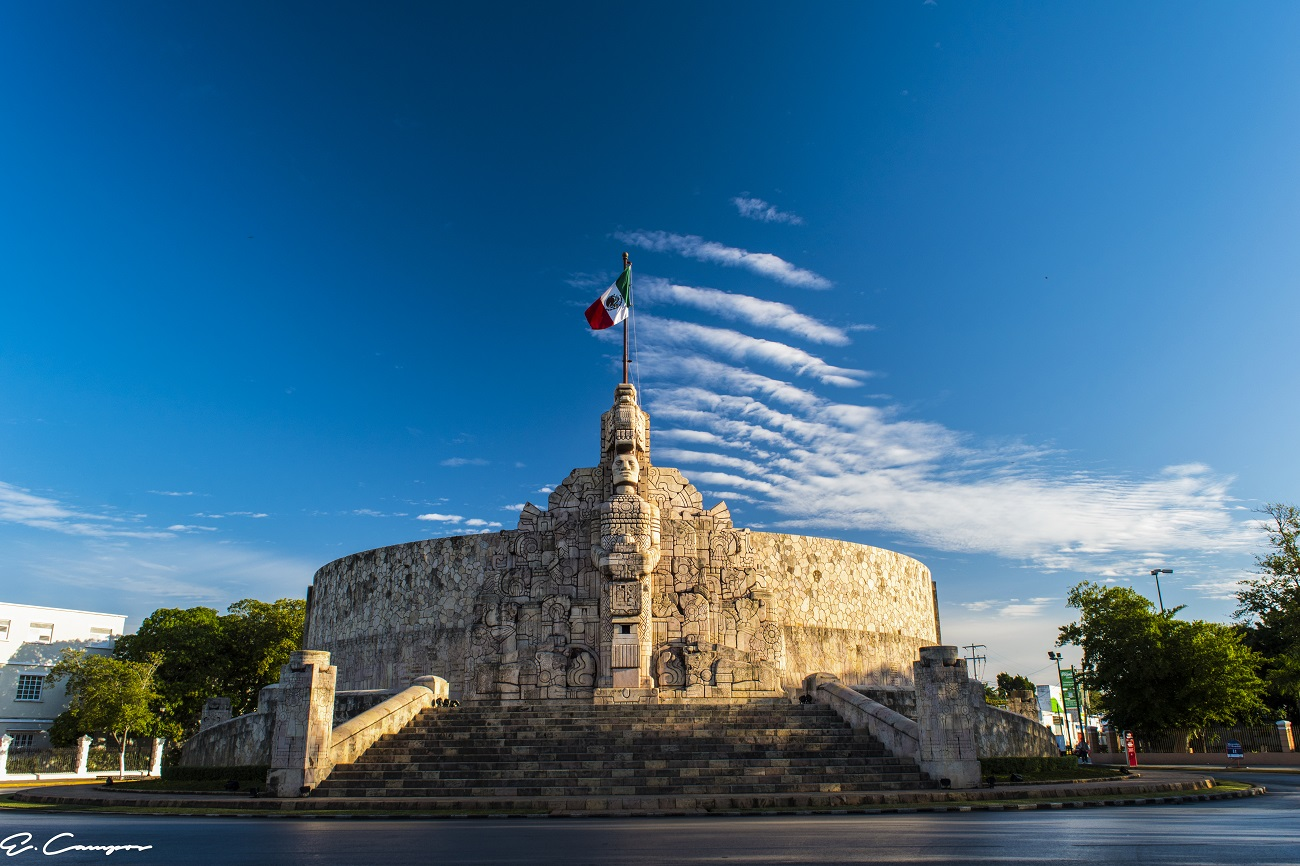
Monumento a la Patria, an iconic monument along the avenue, sculpted by Rómulo Rozo

Paseo de Montejo is an avenue of Mérida, Yucatán, Mexico. It is named after Francisco de Montejo, the Spanish conquistador who founded the city in 1542, and is the location of some of the most iconic buildings and monuments of the city. Inspired by the French boulevard, the avenue is flanked by trees and has several roundabouts along its course. Many beautiful mansions were built along the avenue by wealthy Yucatecans of the 19th century.

It extends north from the city downtown (the Santa Ana neighbourhood) and connects into highway 231 just south of the Mayan Museum (Gran Museo Maya). Its length of over 6 km makes it one of the longest avenues of the city.

== History ==
In the final decades of the 19th century, Yucatán experienced a period of economic prosperity due to the boom of the henequen industry (the green gold). Such prosperity was reflected by the considerable increase in the number of sophisticated civil construction projects, particularly when it came to residential areas. At that time, however, Mérida had no avenues. The only major gathering places in the city were: La Alameda (also known as Paseo de las Bonitas), El Camposanto, La Cruz de Gálvez, and el Limonar. Thus, during the governorship of Guillermo Palomino (1886-1889), there emerged the idea of expanding the urbanization of the Yucatecan capital amidst the advantageous circumstances of the economic boom that they were experiencing.

In January 1888, with the support of a group of farmers, industrialists, and merchants of the era, that idea took shape in the form of a boulevard named "Paseo de Montejo"; the hope and end goal of the project being to modernize the city and to provide an additional hub for social and commercial gatherings.
